= List of Istanbul Metro stations =

As of June 2026, the Istanbul Metro has 169 stations in operation on eleven metro lines (177 including also the three funiculars operated by Metro İstanbul A.Ş.). 117 are on the European side while 60 are on the Asian side. The first stations to open were Aksaray, Emniyet–Fatih, Topkapı–Ulubatlı, Bayrampaşa–Maltepe, Sağmalcılar and Kocatepe all which opened on 3 September 1989 on the M1. The system has 27 stations under construction, 1 station is reserved and 15 stations are currently on hold.

== Operational stations ==
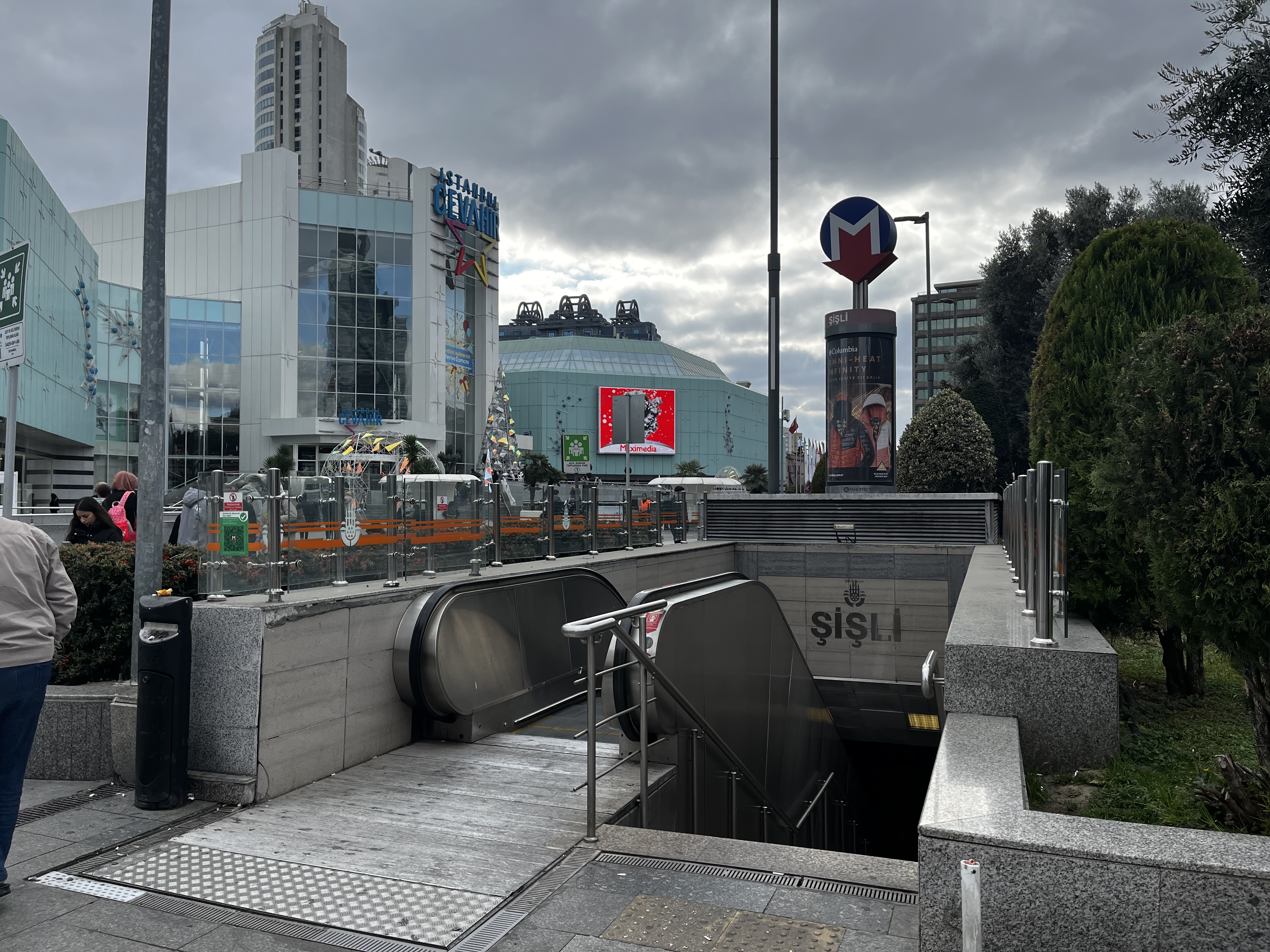
Şişli–Mecidiyeköy station of the Istanbul Metro in front of Istanbul Cevahir, Europe's largest mall between 2005 and 2011.

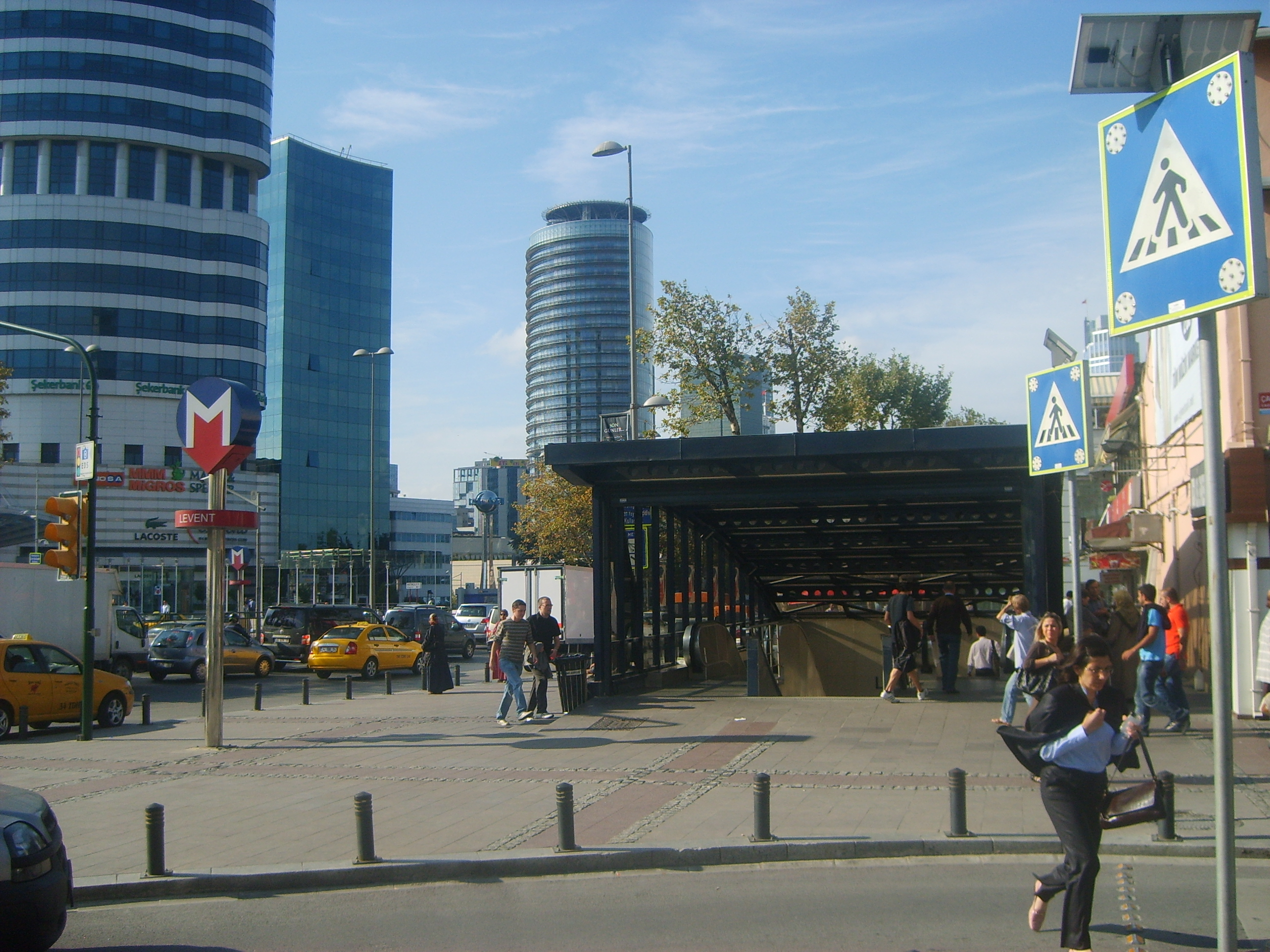
Levent station of the Istanbul Metro

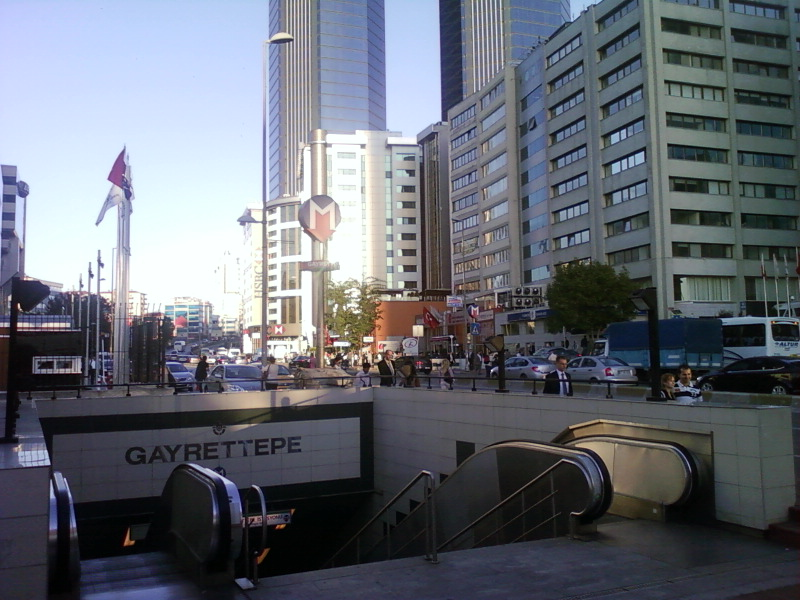
Gayrettepe station

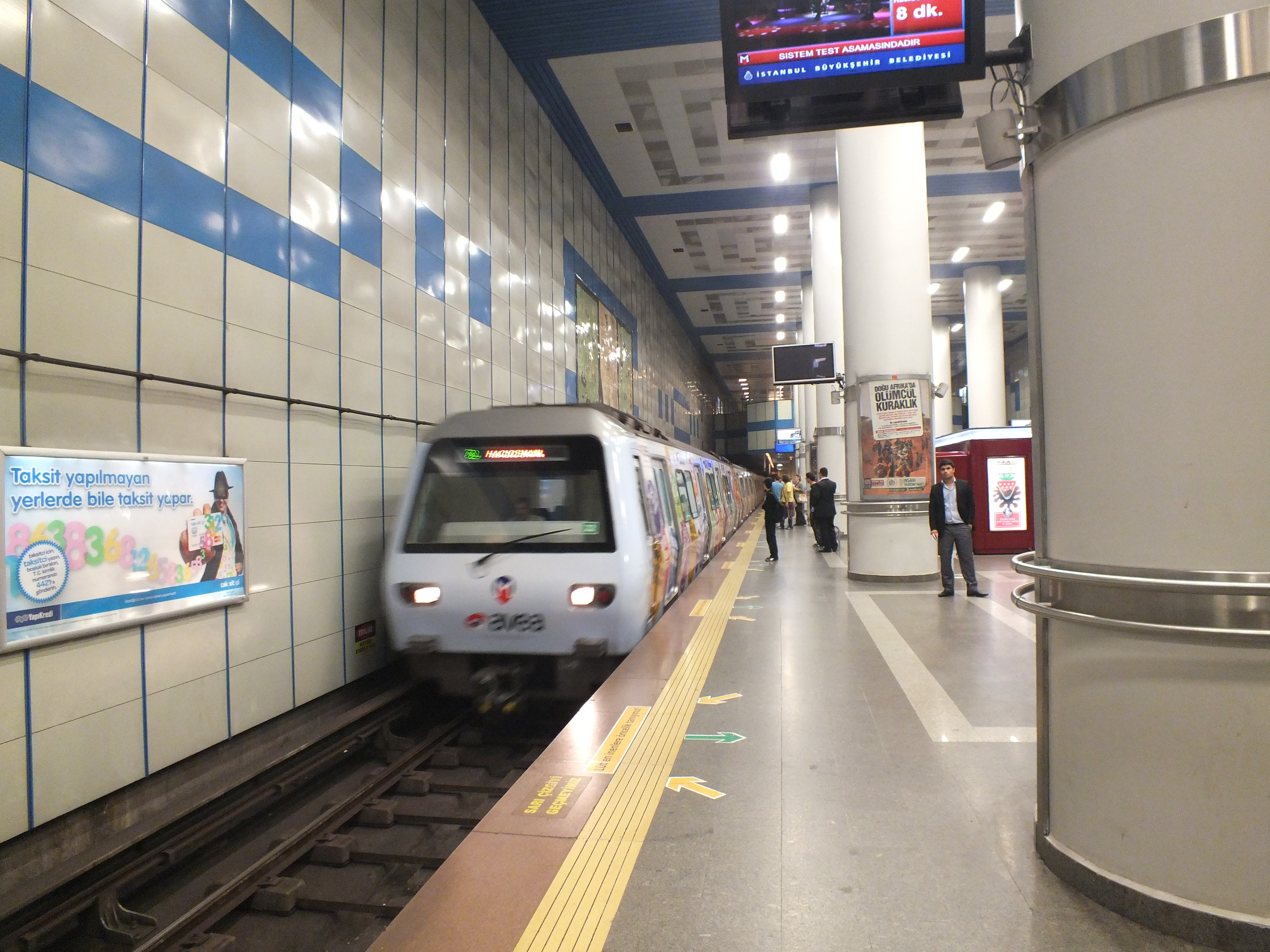
Levent station

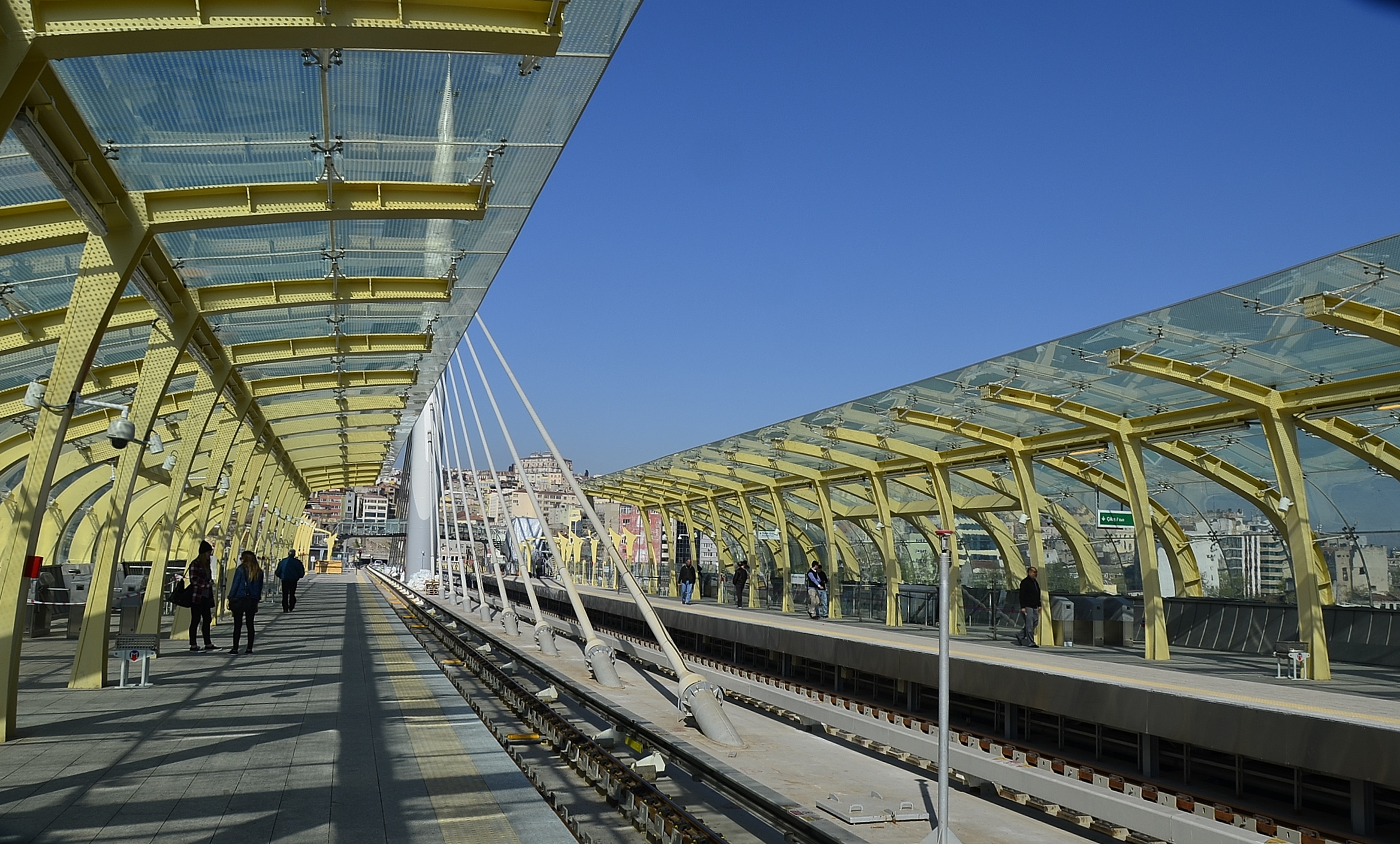
Haliç station on the Golden Horn Metro Bridge

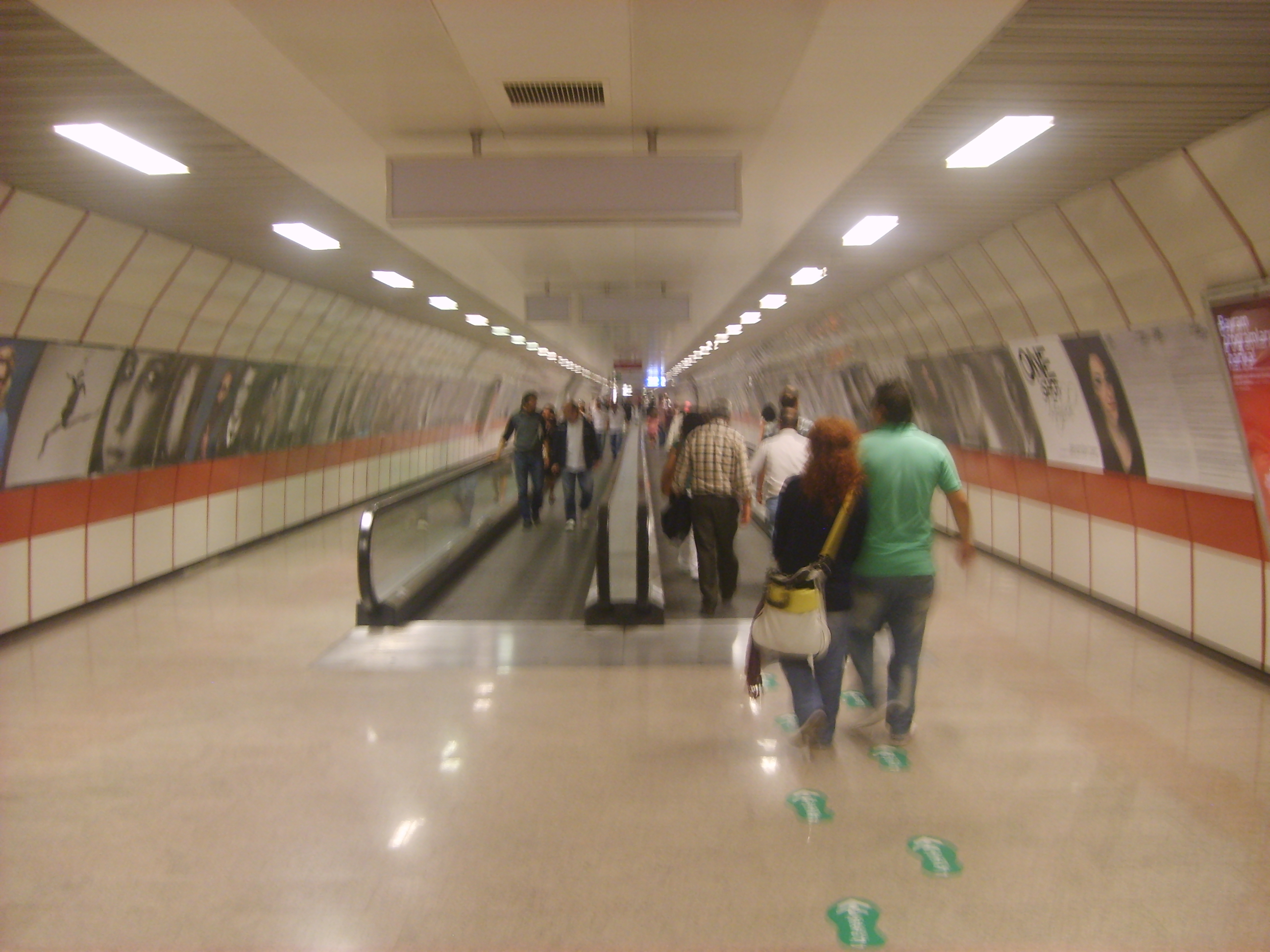
Taksim station

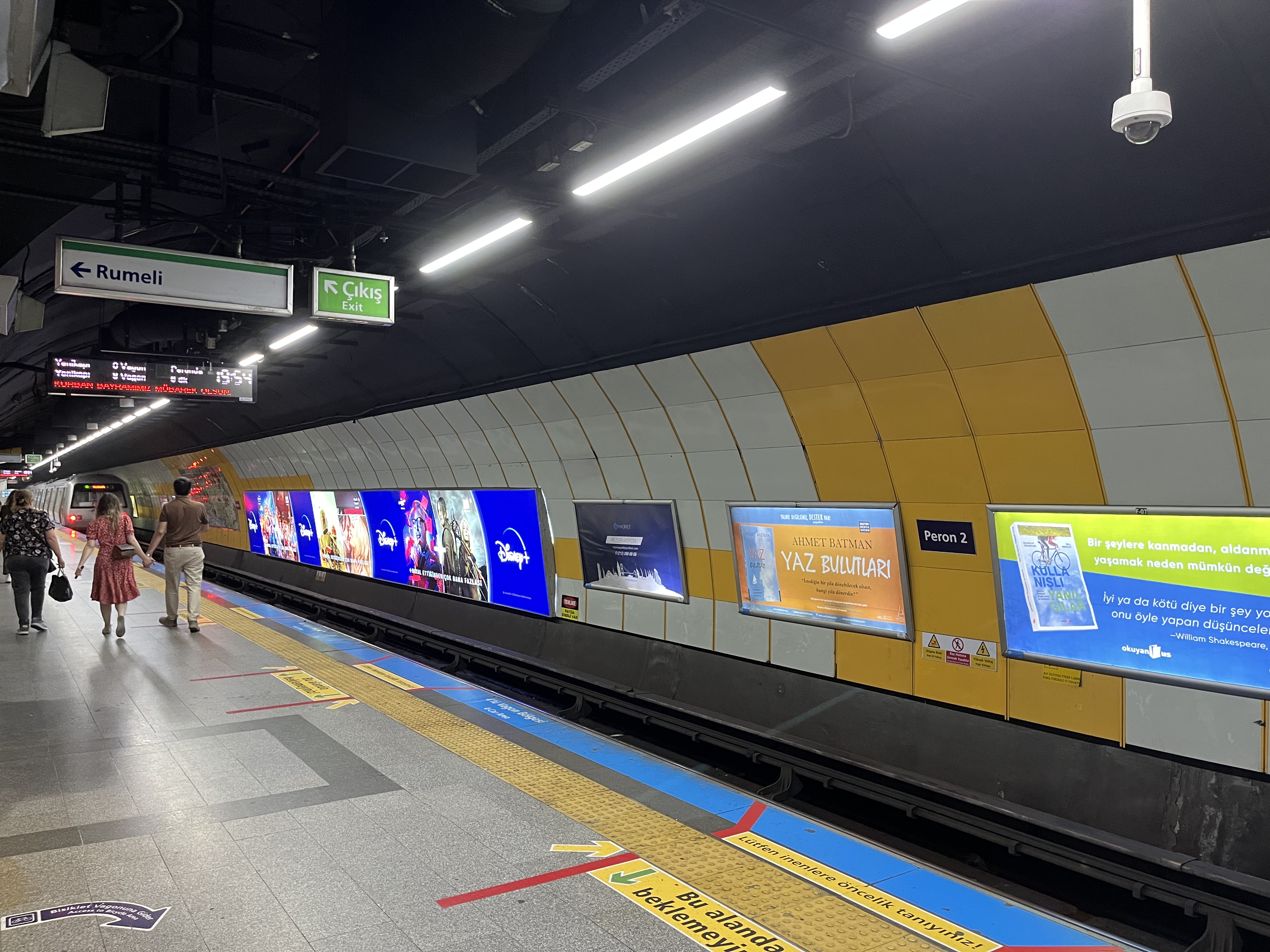
Osmanbey station

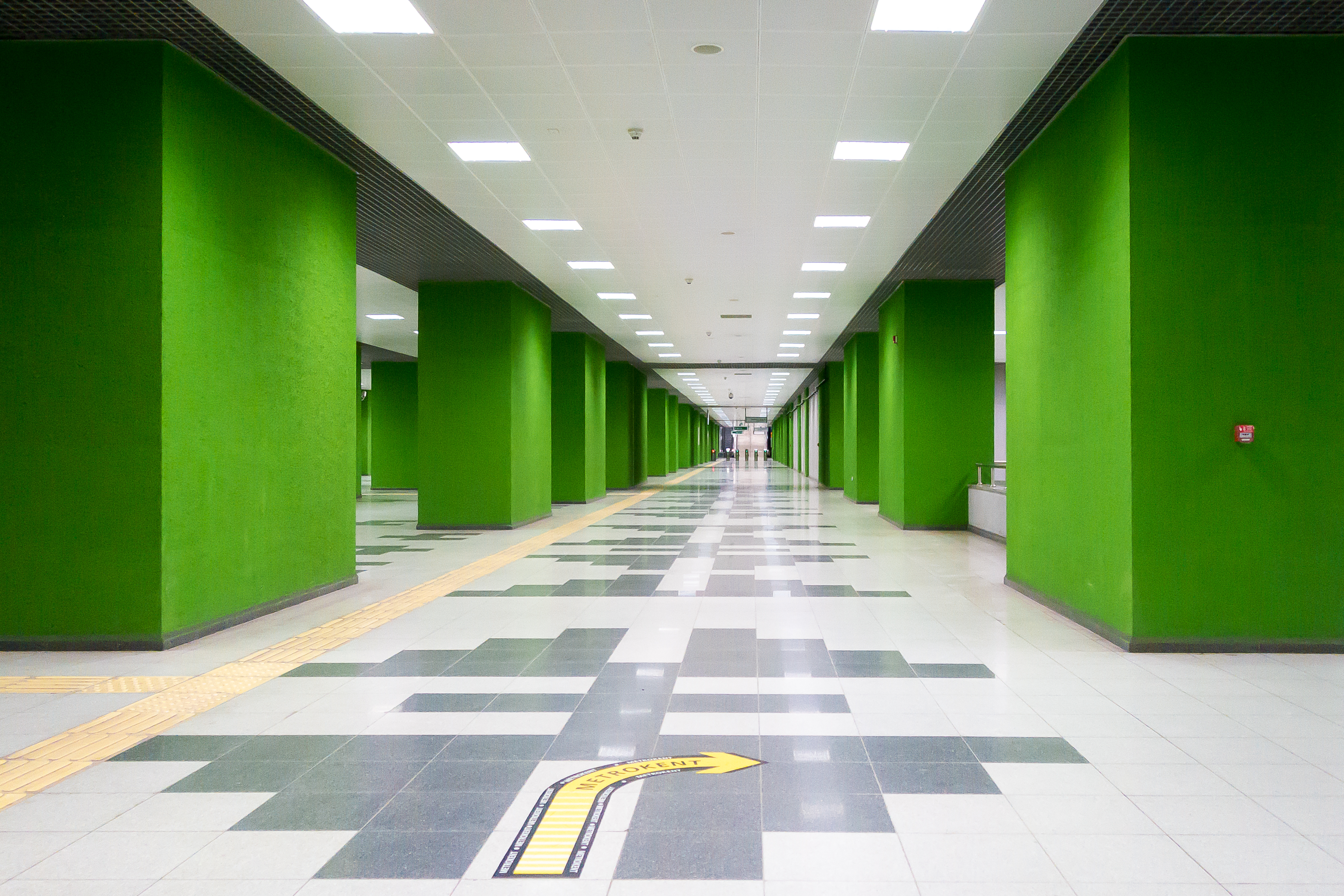
Mahmutbey station

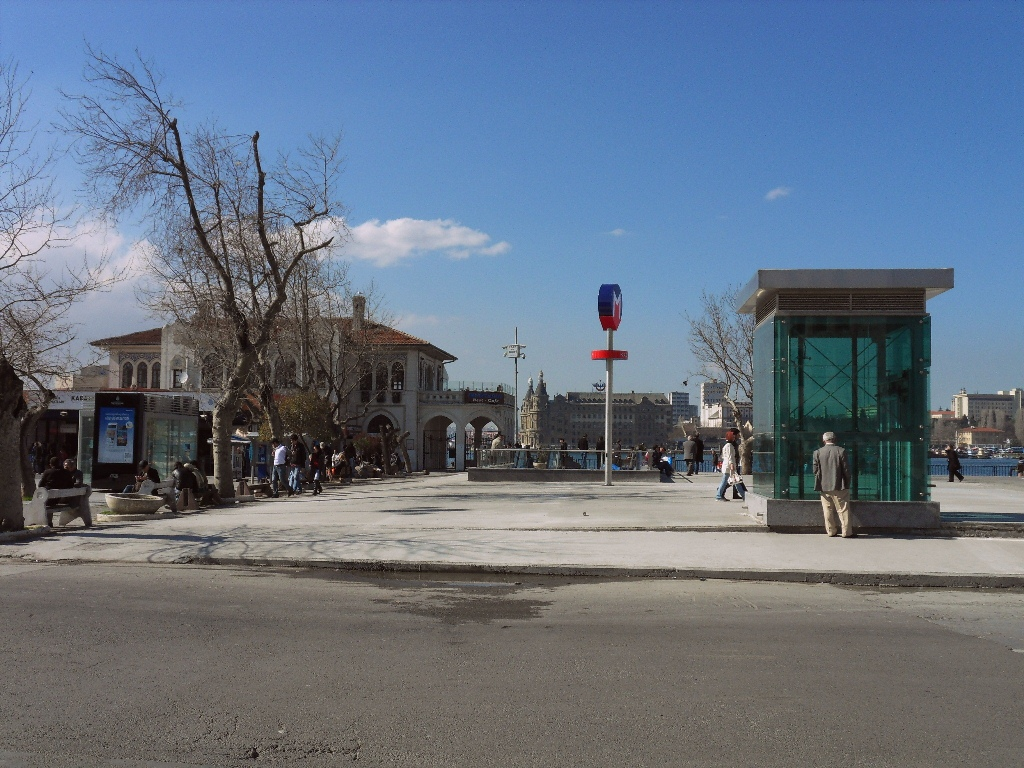
Kadıköy station

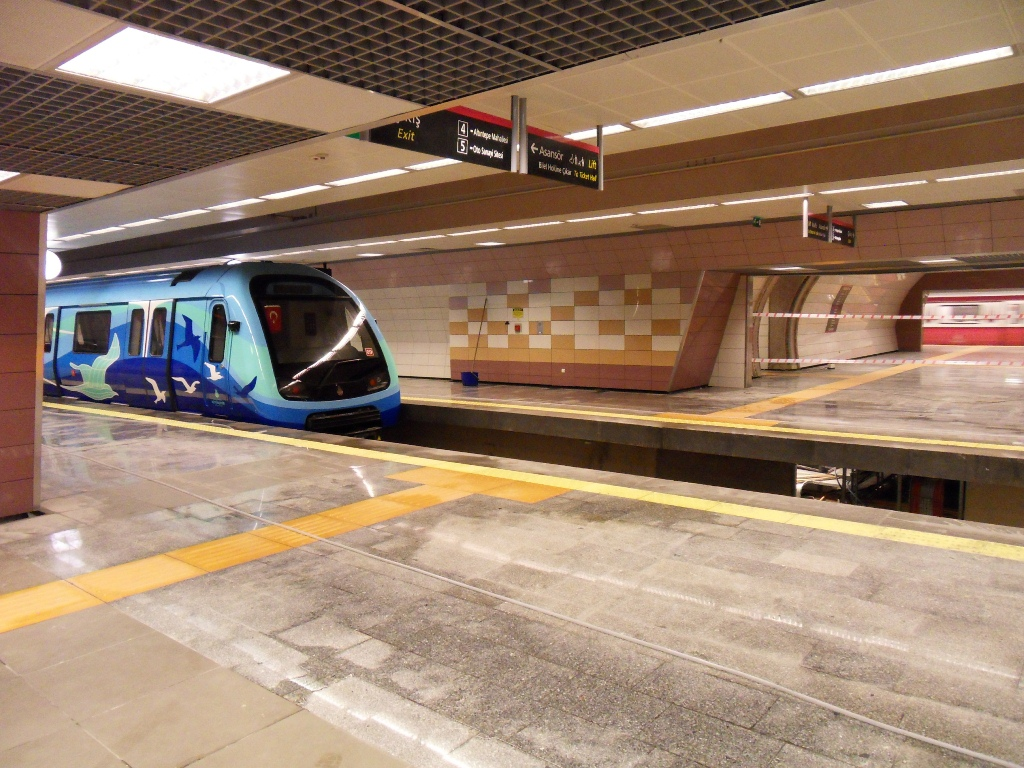
Bostancı station, the only station with 3 tracks in the M4.

Station	Line(s)	District	Opened	Connections
4. Levent	Line M2 HızRay	Şişli/Kağıthane/Beşiktaş	16 September 2000	
15 Temmuz	Line M9	Bağcılar	18 March 2024	
29 Ekim Cumhuriyet	Line M9	Bahçelievler	18 March 2024	
Acıbadem	Line M4	Kadıköy	17 August 2012	
Aksaray	Line M1	Fatih	3 September 1989	Line T1
Alibeyköy	Line M7	Eyüpsultan	28 October 2020	Line T5
Altınşehir	Line M5	Ümraniye	21 October 2018	
Altunizade	Line M5 M14 (Istanbul Metro)	Üsküdar	15 December 2017	Metrobus (Istanbul)
Arnavutköy Hastane	M11 (Istanbul Metro)	Arnavutköy	19 March 2024	
Aşiyan	Line F4	Sarıyer	28 October 2022	İDO
Ataköy	Line M9	Bakırköy	18 March 2024	Marmaray
Ataköy–Şirinevler	Line M1	Bakırköy	25 August 1995	Metrobus (Istanbul)
Atatürk Havalimanı	Line M1	Bakırköy	20 December 2002	
Atatürk Mahallesi	Line M7 Line M9	Küçükçekmece	~2028 (M7); 18 March 2024 (M9)	
Atatürk Oto Sanayi	Line M2	Sarıyer	30 January 2009	
Ayrılık Çeşmesi	Line M4	Kadıköy	29 October 2013	Marmaray
Ayşekadın	Line M8	Kadıköy	6 January 2023	
Bağcılar Meydan	Line M1	Bağcılar	14 June 2013	
Bağlarbaşı	Line M5	Üsküdar	15 December 2017	
Bahariye	Line M9	Küçükçekmece	29 May 2021	
Bahçelievler	Line M1	Bakırköy	15 January 1999	Metrobus (Istanbul)
Bakırköy Sahil	Line M3	Bakırköy	10 March 2024	İDO
Bakırköy–İncirli	Line M1 Line M3	Bakırköy	7 March 1994 (M1A); 10 March 2024 (M3)	Metrobus (Istanbul)
Başak Konutları	Line M3	Başakşehir	14 June 2013	
Başakşehir–MetroKent	Line M3	Başakşehir	14 June 2013	
Bayrampaşa–Maltepe	Line M1	Bayrampaşa/Eyüpsultan	3 September 1989	
Boğaziçi Üniversitesi	Line M6 Line F4	Beşiktaş	19 April 2015 (M6); 28 October 2022 (F4)	
Bostancı	Line M4	Kadıköy	17 August 2012	
Bostancı	Line M8	Kadıköy	6 January 2023	Marmaray Bostancı Ferry Terminal
Bulgurlu	Line M5	Üsküdar	15 December 2017	
Çağlayan	Line M7	Kağıthane	28 October 2020	
Çakmak	Line M5	Ümraniye	21 October 2018	
Çarşı	Line M5 M12 (Istanbul Metro)	Ümraniye	15 December 2017 (M5); ~2026 (M12)	
Çekmeköy	Line M5	Sancaktepe	21 October 2018	
Çırçır	Line M7	Eyüpsultan	28 October 2020	
Çobançeşme	Line M9	Bahçelievler	18 March 2024	
Darüşşafaka	Line M2	Sarıyer	2 September 2010	
Davutpaşa–YTÜ	Line M1	Güngören	31 January 1994	
Doğu Sanayi	Line M9	Bahçelievler	18 March 2024	
DTM–İstanbul Fuar Merkezi	Line M1	Bakırköy	20 December 2002	
Dudullu	Line M5 Line M8	Ümraniye	21 October 2018 (M5); 6 January 2023 (M8)	
Emin Ali Paşa	Line M8	Kadıköy	6 January 2023	
Emniyet–Fatih	Line M1	Fatih	3 September 1989	
Esenkent	Line M4	Maltepe	17 August 2012	
Esenler	Line M1	Esenler	18 December 1989	
Etiler	Line M6	Beşiktaş	19 April 2015	
Fevzi Çakmak–Hastane	Line M4	Pendik	2 October 2022	
Fıstıkağacı	Line M5	Üsküdar	15 December 2017	
Fulya	Line M7	Beşiktaş	2 January 2023	
Gayrettepe	Line M2 M11 (Istanbul Metro)	Şişli	16 September 2000 (M2); 29 January 2024 (M11)	Metrobus (Istanbul)
Giyimkent–Tekstilkent	Line M7	Esenler	28 October 2020	
Göktürk	M11 (Istanbul Metro)	Eyüpsultan	22 January 2023	
Göztepe	Line M4 M13 (Istanbul Metro)	Kadıköy/Üsküdar	17 August 2012	
Göztepe Mahallesi	Line M7	Bağcılar	28 October 2020	
Gülsuyu	Line M4	Maltepe	17 August 2012	
Hacıosman	Line M2	Sarıyer	23 May 2011	
Haliç	Line M2	Fatih/Beyoğlu	15 February 2014	Line T5
Halkalı	Line M1 M11 (Istanbul Metro) HızRay	Küçükçekmece	20 June 2026 (M11)	Marmaray
Halkalı Stadı	M11 (Istanbul Metro)	Küçükçekmece	20 June 2026	
Halkalı Caddesi	Line M9	Bahçelievler	18 March 2024	
Hasanpaşa	Line M5	Sultanbeyli	22 May 2026	
Hasdal	M11 (Istanbul Metro)	Eyüpsultan	1 January 2023	
Hastane–Adliye	Line M4	Kartal	17 August 2012	
Haznedar	Line M3	Bahçelievler	10 March 2024	
Huzur	Line M8	Ümraniye	6 January 2023	
Huzurevi	Line M4	Maltepe	17 August 2012	
Ihlamurkuyu	Line M5	Ümraniye	21 October 2018	
İbn Haldun Üniversitesi	M11 (Istanbul Metro)	Başakşehir	20 June 2026	
İçerenköy	Line M8	Ataşehir	6 January 2023	
İhsaniye	M11 (Istanbul Metro)	Eyüpsultan	22 January 2023	
İkitelli Sanayi	Line M3 Line M9	Başakşehir	14 June 2013	
İlkyuva	Line M3	Bahçelievler	10 March 2024	
İmam Hatip Lisesi	Line M5	Ümraniye	21 October 2018	
İMES	Line M8	Ümraniye	6 January 2023	
İstanbul Havalimanı	M11 (Istanbul Metro)	Arnavutköy	22 January 2023	
İSTOÇ	Line M3	Başakşehir	14 June 2013	
İ.T.Ü.–Ayazağa	Line M2	Sarıyer	30 January 2009	
Kabataş	Line M7 Line F1	Beyoğlu	29 June 2006	Line T1 İDO
Kadıköy	Line M4	Kadıköy	17 August 2012	Line T3 İDO
Kağıthane	Line M7 M11 (Istanbul Metro) HızRay	Kağıthane	28 October 2020 (M7); 22 January 2023 (M11)	
Karadeniz Mahallesi	Line M7	Gaziosmanpaşa	28 October 2020	Line T4
Kargo Terminali	M11 (Istanbul Metro)	Arnavutköy	22 January 2023	
Kartal	Line M4	Kartal	17 August 2012	
Kayaşehir	M11 (Istanbul Metro)	Başakşehir	20 June 2026	Line M3
Kayaşehir Merkez	Line M3	Başakşehir	8 April 2023	M11 (Istanbul Metro)
Kayışdağı	Line M8	Ataşehir	6 January 2023	
Kâzım Karabekir	Line M7	Gaziosmanpaşa	28 October 2020	
Kemerburgaz	M11 (Istanbul Metro)	Eyüpsultan	22 January 2023	
Kirazlı	Line M1 Line M3 HızRay	Bağcılar	14 June 2013	
Kısıklı	Line M5	Üsküdar	15 December 2017	
Kocatepe	Line M1	Bayrampaşa	3 September 1989	
Kozyatağı	Line M4 Line M8	Kadıköy/Ataşehir	17 August 2012 (M4); 6 January 2023 (M8)	
Kurtköy	Line M4 M10 (Istanbul Metro)	Pendik	2 October 2022	
Küçükbakkalköy	Line M8	Ataşehir	6 January 2023	
Küçükyalı	Line M4	Maltepe	17 August 2012	
Levent	Line M2 Line M6	Şişli/Beşiktaş	16 September 2000	
Mahmutbey	Line M3 Line M7	Bağcılar	14 June 2013 (M3); 28 October 2020 (M7)	
Maltepe	Line M4	Maltepe	17 August 2012	
MASKO	Line M9	Başakşehir	29 May 2021	
Meclis	Line M5	Sancaktepe	16 March 2024	
Menderes	Line M1	Esenler	14 June 2013	
Merter	Line M1	Güngören	31 January 1994	Metrobus (Istanbul)
Mevlana	Line M8 HızRay	Ataşehir	6 January 2023	
Mimar Sinan	Line M1 Line M9	Bağcılar	~2028 (M1B); 30 August 2024 (M9)	
MODOKO–KEYAP	Line M8	Ümraniye	6 January 2023	
Molla Gürani	Line M3	Bağcılar	10 March 2024	
Necip Fazıl	Line M5	Ümraniye	21 October 2018	
Nispetiye	Line M6	Beşiktaş	19 April 2015	
Nurtepe	Line M7	Kağıthane	28 October 2020	
Olimpiyat	Line M9	Başakşehir	22 November 2013	M11 (Istanbul Metro)
Olimpiyatköy	M11 (Istanbul Metro)	Başakşehir	20 June 2026	Line M9
Onurkent	Line M3	Başakşehir	8 April 2023	
Oruç Reis	Line M7	Bağcılar	28 October 2020	
Osmanbey	Line M2	Şişli	16 September 2000	
Otogar	Line M1 HızRay	Bayrampaşa	31 January 1994	
Özgürlük Meydanı	Line M3	Bakırköy	10 March 2024	Marmaray
Parseller	Line M8	Ümraniye	6 January 2023	
Pendik	Line M4	Pendik	10 October 2016	
Sabiha Gökçen Havalimanı	Line M4 M10 (Istanbul Metro) HızRay	Pendik	2 October 2022	
Sağmalcılar	Line M1	Bayrampaşa	3 September 1989	
Samandıra Merkez	Line M5	Sancaktepe	16 March 2024	
Sanayi Mahallesi	Line M2	Sarıyer	30 January 2009	
Sancaktepe	Line M5 HızRay	Sancaktepe	16 March 2024	
Sancaktepe Şehir Hastanesi	Line M5	Sancaktepe	22 May 2026	
Sarıgazi	Line M5	Sancaktepe	16 March 2024	
Seyrantepe	Line M2 Line F3	Sarıyer	11 November 2010 (M2); 29 October 2017 (F3)	
Siteler	Line M3	Başakşehir	13 June 2013	
Soğanlık	Line M4	Kartal	17 August 2012	
Şehir Hastanesi	Line M3	Başakşehir	8 April 2023	
Şişhane	Line M2	Beyoğlu	30 January 2009	Line T2 Tünel
Şişli–Mecidiyeköy	Line M2 Line M7	Şişli	16 September 2000 (M2); 28 October 2020 (M7)	Metrobus (Istanbul)
Sultanbeyli	Line M5	Sultanbeyli	22 May 2026	
Taksim	Line M2 Line F1	Beyoğlu	16 September 2000	Line T2
Taşoluk	M11 (Istanbul Metro)	Arnavutköy	19 March 2024	
Tavşantepe	Line M4	Pendik	10 October 2016	
Terazidere	Line M1	Güngören/Esenler/Bayrampaşa	31 January 1994	
Topkapı–Ulubatlı	Line M1	Fatih	3 September 1989	Line T4
Toplu Konutlar	Line M3	Başakşehir	8 April 2023	
Turgut Özal	Line M3	Başakşehir	14 June 2013	
Üçyüzlü	Line M1	Bağcılar	14 June 2013	
Ümraniye	Line M5 HızRay	Ümraniye	15 December 2017	
Ünalan	Line M4	Kadıköy	17 August 2012	Metrobus (Istanbul)
Üsküdar	Line M5	Üsküdar	15 December 2017	Marmaray İDO
Vadistanbul	Line F3	Sarıyer	29 October 2017	
Veysel Karani	Line M5	Sancaktepe	22 May 2026	
Veysel Karani–Akşemsettin	Line M7	Eyüpsultan	28 October 2020	
Vezneciler–İstanbul Üniversitesi	Line M2	Fatih	16 March 2014	Line T1
Yakacık–Adnan Kahveci	Line M4	Kartal	10 October 2016	
Yamanevler	Line M5	Ümraniye	15 December 2017	
Yayalar–Şeyhli	Line M4	Pendik	2 October 2022	
Yenibosna	Line M1 Line M9	Bakırköy	25 August 1995 (M1A); 18 March 2024 (M9)	Metrobus (Istanbul)
Yenikapı	Line M1 Line M2	Fatih	15 February 2014 (M2); 9 November 2014 (M1)	Marmaray
Yenimahalle	Line M3	Bağcılar	14 June 2013	
Yenimahalle	Line M7	Gaziosmanpaşa	28 October 2020	
Yenisahra	Line M4 M12 (Istanbul Metro)	Kadıköy/Ataşehir	17 August 2012 (M3); ~2026 (M12)	
Yeşilpınar	Line M7	Eyüpsultan	28 October 2020	
Yıldız	Line M7	Beşiktaş	2 January 2023	
Yıldıztepe	Line M3	Bağcılar	8 October 2025	
Zeytinburnu	Line M1	Bakırköy	31 January 1994	Line T1 Metrobus (Istanbul)
Ziya Gökalp Mahallesi	Line M9	Başakşehir	14 June 2013	

== By district ==
District	Number of Stations	Stations	Line(s)	First Station(s)	Most Recent Station(s)
Ümraniye	18	Altınşehir, Atakent, Çakmak, Çarşı, Dudullu, Finans Merkezi, Huzur, Ihlamurkuyu, İmam Hatip Lisesi, İMES, Kâzım Karabekir, MODOKO–KEYAP, Necip Fazıl, Parseller, SBÜ Hastanesi, Site, Ümraniye, Yamanevler	Line M5 Line M8 M12 (Istanbul Metro)	15 December 2017	2026 (planned)
Başakşehir	13	Başak Konutları, İbn Haldun Üniversitesi, İkitelli Sanayi, Kayaşehir, Kayaşehir Merkez, MASKO, Başakşehir–Metrokent, Olimpiyat, Olimpiyatköy, Onurkent, Siteler, Şehir Hastanesi, Toplu Konutlar, Turgut Özal, Ziya Gökalp Mahallesi	Line M3 Line M9 M11 (Istanbul Metro)	14 June 2013	20 June 2026
Kadıköy	13	60. Yıl Parkı, Acıbadem, Ayşekadın, Ayrılık Çeşmesi, Bostancı, Emin Ali Paşa, Göztepe, Kadıköy, Kozyatağı, Sahrayıcedit, Tütüncü Mehmet Efendi, Ünalan, Yenisahra	Line M4 Line M8 M12 (Istanbul Metro)	17 August 2012	2026 (planned)
Bağcılar	12	15 Temmuz, Bağcılar Meydan, Göztepe Mahallesi, İSTOÇ, Kirazlı, Mahmutbey, Mimar Sinan, Molla Gürani, Oruç Reis, Üçyüzlü, Yenimahalle, Yıldıztepe	Line M1 Line M3 Line M7 Line M9	14 June 2013	8 October 2025
Bakırköy	9	Ataköy, Ataköy–Şirinevler, Atatürk Havalimanı, Bakırköy, Bakırköy Sahil, DTM–İstanbul Fuar Merkezi, Özgürlük Meydanı, Yenibosna, Zeytinburnu	Line M1 Line M3 Line M9	31 January 1994	18 March 2024
Sarıyer	8	Aşiyan, Atatürk Oto Sanayi, Darüşşafaka, Hacıosman, İTÜ–Ayazağa, Sanayi Mahallesi, Seyrantepe, Vadistanbul	Line M2 Line F3 Line F4	31 January 2009	28 October 2022
Eyüpsultan	8	Alibeyköy, Çırçır, Göktürk, Hasdal, İhsaniye, Kemerburgaz, Veysel Karani–Akşemsettin, Yeşilpınar	Line M7 M11 (Istanbul Metro)	28 October 2020	2 January 2023
Beşiktaş	7	4. Levent, Boğaziçi Üniversitesi, Etiler, Fulya, Levent, Nispetiye, Yıldız	Line M2 Line M6 Line M7 Line F4	16 September 2000	2 January 2023
Fatih	6	Aksaray, Emniyet–Fatih, Haliç, Topkapı–Ulubatlı, Vezneciler–İstanbul Üniversitesi, Yenikapı	Line M1 Line M2	3 September 1989	15 February 2014
Üsküdar	6	Altunizade, Bağlarbaşı, Bulgurlu, Fıstıkağacı, Kısıklı, Üsküdar	Line M5	15 December 2017	15 December 2017
Pendik	6	Fevzi Çakmak-Hastane, Kurtköy, Pendik, Sabiha Gökçen Havalimanı, Tavşantepe, Yayalar–Şeyhli	Line M4 M10 (Istanbul Metro)	10 October 2016	2 October 2022
Bahçelievler	6	29 Ekim Cumhuriyet, Bahçelievler, Çobançeşme, Doğu Sanayi, Haznedar, İlkyuva	Line M1 Line M3 Line M9	31 January 1994	18 March 2024
Sancaktepe	6	Meclis, Samandıra Merkez, Sancaktepe, Sancaktepe Şehir Hastanesi, Sarıgazi, Veysel Karani	Line M5	16 March 2024	22 May 2026
Maltepe	5	Bostancı, Esenkent, Gülsuyu, Huzurevi, Küçükyalı, Maltepe	Line M4	17 August 2012	6 January 2023
Arnavutköy	5	Arnavutköy Hastane, İstanbul Havalimanı, Kargo Terminali, Taşoluk, Terminal 2	M11 (Istanbul Metro)	22 January 2023	19 March 2024
Küçükçekmece	5	Atatürk Mahallesi, Bahariye, Halkalı, Halkalı Caddesi, Halkalı Stadı	Line M9 M11 (Istanbul Metro)	29 May 2021	20 June 2026
Ataşehir	5	Ataşehir, İçerenköy, Kayışdağı, Küçükbakkalköy, Mevlana	Line M8 M12 (Istanbul Metro)	6 January 2023	2026 (planned)
Bayrampaşa	4	Bayrampaşa–Maltepe, Kocatepe, Otogar, Sağmalcılar	Line M1	3 September 1989	31 January 1994
Beyoğlu	4	Haliç, Kabataş, Şişhane, Taksim	Line M2 Line M7 Line F1	16 September 2000	15 February 2014
Kartal	4	Hastane–Adliye, Kartal, Soğanlık, Yakacık–Adnan Kahveci	Line M4	17 August 2012	10 October 2016
Kağıthane	4	4. Levent, Çağlayan, Kağıthane, Nurtepe	Line M2 Line M7 M11 (Istanbul Metro)	28 October 2020	22 January 2023
Şişli	4	Gayrettepe, Levent, Osmanbey, Şişli–Mecidiyeköy	Line M2 Line M7 M11 (Istanbul Metro)	16 September 2000	29 January 2024
Esenler	4	Esenler, Giyimkent–Tekstilkent, Menderes, Oruç Reis	Line M1 Line M7	18 December 1989	28 October 2020
Gaziosmanpaşa	3	Karadeniz Mahallesi, Kâzım Karabekir, Yenimahalle	Line M7	28 October 2020	28 October 2020
Güngören	3	Davutpaşa–YTÜ, Merter, Terazidere	Line M1	31 January 1994	31 January 1994
Sultanbeyli	2	Hasanpaşa, Sultanbeyli	Line M5	22 May 2026	22 May 2026
Çekmeköy	1	Çekmeköy	Line M5	21 October 2018	21 October 2018

== Under construction stations ==
There are 27 stations under construction.

Station	Line(s)	District	Planned Opening	Connections
60. Yıl Parkı	M12 (Istanbul Metro)	Kadıköy	2026	
Atakent	M12 (Istanbul Metro)	Ümraniye	2026	
Ataşehir	M12 (Istanbul Metro)	Ataşehir	2026	
Aydınlar	M13 (Istanbul Metro)	Çekmeköy	2026	
Barbaros	Line M1	Bağcılar	2029	
Beşiktaş	Line M7	Beşiktaş	2026	İDO
Bosna Bulvarı	M14 (Istanbul Metro)	Üsküdar	2026	
Bölge Parkı	Line M7	Küçükçekmece	2026	
Cumhuriyet	M13 (Istanbul Metro)	Çekmeköy	2026	
Çamlıca Camii	M14 (Istanbul Metro)	Üsküdar	2026	
Emek	M13 (Istanbul Metro)	Sancaktepe	2026	
Fatih	Line M1	Bağcılar	2029	
Ferah Mahallesi	M14 (Istanbul Metro)	Üsküdar	2026	
Finans Merkezi	M12 (Istanbul Metro) HızRay	Ataşehir	2026	
Halkalı-Üniversite	Line M1	Küçükçekmece	2029	
Hastane	Line M7	Küçükçekmece	2026	
Kaynarca Merkez	Line M4 M10 (Istanbul Metro)	Pendik	2027	
Kâzım Karabekir	M12 (Istanbul Metro) M14 (Istanbul Metro)	Ümraniye	2026	
Malazgirt	Line M1	Bağcılar	2029	
Pendik Merkez	M10 (Istanbul Metro)	Pendik	2027	Marmaray
Sahrayıcedit	M12 (Istanbul Metro)	Kadıköy	2026	
SBÜ Hastanesi	M12 (Istanbul Metro)	Ümraniye	2026	
Site	M12 (Istanbul Metro) M13 (Istanbul Metro)	Ümraniye	2026	
Atakent Mahallesi	Line M7	Küçükçekmece	2028	
Toplu Konutlar	Line M7	Küçükçekmece	2026	
Tütüncü Mehmet Efendi	M12 (Istanbul Metro)	Kadıköy	2026	Marmaray
Yenidoğan	M13 (Istanbul Metro)	Sancaktepe	2026	

== Planned stations ==
Station	Line(s)	District	Planned Opening	Connections
Adnan Kahveci	Line M2	Bahçelievler		
Akşemsettin	Line M5	Sultanbeyli		
Alibeyköy Cep Otogarı	Line M2	Eyüpsultan		Line T5
Ataşehir	M13 (Istanbul Metro)	Ataşehir		
Avcılar Merkez	M20 (Istanbul Metro)	Avcılar		Metrobus (Istanbul)
Bahçeşehir	Line M7	Başakşehir		
Beylikdüzü	M20 (Istanbul Metro) HızRay	Beylikdüzü		Metrobus (Istanbul)
Bezirganbahçe	Line M1	Küçükçekmece		
Büyükdere	Line M2	Sarıyer		İDO
Cennet	M20 (Istanbul Metro)	Küçükçekmece		
Cihangir	M20 (Istanbul Metro)	Avcılar		Metrobus (Istanbul)
Çayırbaşı	Line M2	Sarıyer		
Çobançeşme	Line M2	Eyüpsultan		
Değirmenaltı	Line M4	Tuzla		
Esenkent	Line M7	Esenyurt		
Esenkent	M13 (Istanbul Metro)	Ümraniye		
Esenyalı	Line M4	Pendik		
Esenyurt Belediye	Line M7	Esenyurt		
Esenyurt Meydanı	Line M7	Esenyurt		
Finanskent	M13 (Istanbul Metro) HızRay	Ümraniye		
Firuzköy	Line M7	Esenyurt		
Fuar Alanı	Line M5	Sultanbeyli		
Gençlik Parkı	M13 (Istanbul Metro)	Üsküdar		
Gölet	Line M5	Sultanbeyli		
Hamidiye	Line M2	Kağıthane		
Ispartakule	Line M7	Başakşehir		Halkalı-Bahçeşehir Rail System
İçmeler/Tuzla Belediyesi	Line M4	Tuzla		Marmaray
İSKİ Arıtma	Line M2	Kağıthane		
Kocamustafapaşa	Line M2	Fatih		
Kurtköy YHT/ViaPort	Line M4 Line M5 M10 (Istanbul Metro) HızRay	Pendik		
Küçükçekmece	M20 (Istanbul Metro)	Küçükçekmece		Metrobus (Istanbul)
Libadiye	M13 (Istanbul Metro)	Üsküdar		
Mehmet Akif Ersoy	Line M1	Küçükçekmece		
Nazım Hikmet	Line M7 HızRay	Esenyurt		
Osmaniye	Line M2	Bakırköy		
Reşitpaşa	Line M2	Avcılar		
Saadetdere	Line M7	Avcılar Esenyurt		Metrobus (Istanbul)
Sarıyer	Line M2	Sarıyer		İDO
Sefaköy	Line M2 M20 (Istanbul Metro)	Küçükçekmece		Metrobus (Istanbul)
Silivrikapı	Line M2	Sarıyer		
Siyavuşpaşa	Line M2	Bahçelievler		
Söğütlüçeşme	M13 (Istanbul Metro)	Kadıköy		Marmaray Metrobus (Istanbul)
Şehir Hastanesi	M13 (Istanbul Metro)	Kadıköy		
Şerifali	M13 (Istanbul Metro)	Ümraniye		
Tahtakale	Line M7	Avcılar		
Teknopark	Line M4 M10 (Istanbul Metro)	Pendik		
Tersane	Line M4	Pendik		
Topağacı Mahallesi	M14 (Istanbul Metro)	Ümraniye		
Tuzla Sahil	Line M4	Tuzla		
TÜYAP	M20 (Istanbul Metro)	Beylikdüzü		Metrobus (Istanbul)
Ümraniye Spor Köyü	M14 (Istanbul Metro)	Ümraniye		
Yavuztürk Mahallesi	M14 (Istanbul Metro)	Üsküdar		
Yenidoğan	Line M1	Küçükçekmece		
Yenişehir	Line M4 M10 (Istanbul Metro)	Pendik		
Yıldırım Beyazıt	M20 (Istanbul Metro)	Beylikdüzü		Metrobus (Istanbul)
Zafer	Line M2	Bahçelievler		
Zeytinburnu Adliye	Line M2	Zeytinburnu		
