= Menderes station =

Station of the Istanbul Metro

Menderes
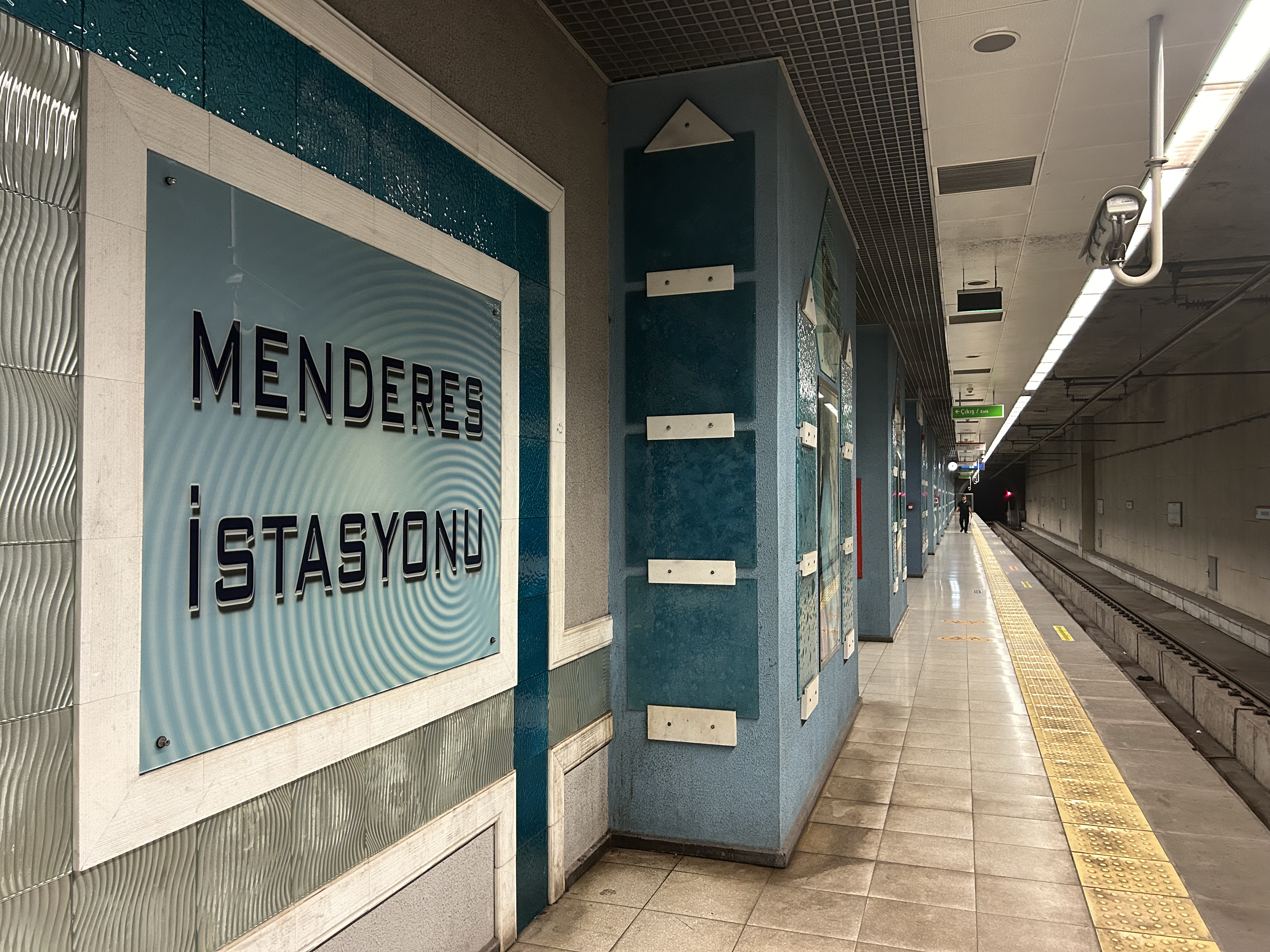
- Platform

General information
- Location: Menderes Neighborhood, 377. Sk, 34225; Esenler, Istanbul; Turkey
- Coordinates: 41°2′34″N 28°52′43″E
- System: Istanbul Metro rapid transit station
- Owner: Istanbul Metropolitan Municipality
- Line: M1B
- Platforms: 1 island platform
- Tracks: 2

Construction
- Structure type: Underground
- Accessible: Yes

History
- Opened: 14 June 2013
- Electrified: 750 V DC Overhead line

Services
Preceding station	Istanbul Metro	Following station
Üçyüzlü towards Kirazlı	M1b Line	Esenler towards Yenikapı
Location

Menderes is an underground rapid transit station on the M1B line of the Istanbul Metro. It was opened on 14 June 2013 as part of the four new stations of the M1B extension to Kirazlı.

== Layout ==
Track 2	← toward Kirazlı (Üçyüzlü)
Island platform, doors will open on the left
Track 1	toward Yenikapı (Esenler) →
