= Üçyüzlü station =

Station of the Istanbul Metro

Üçyüzlü
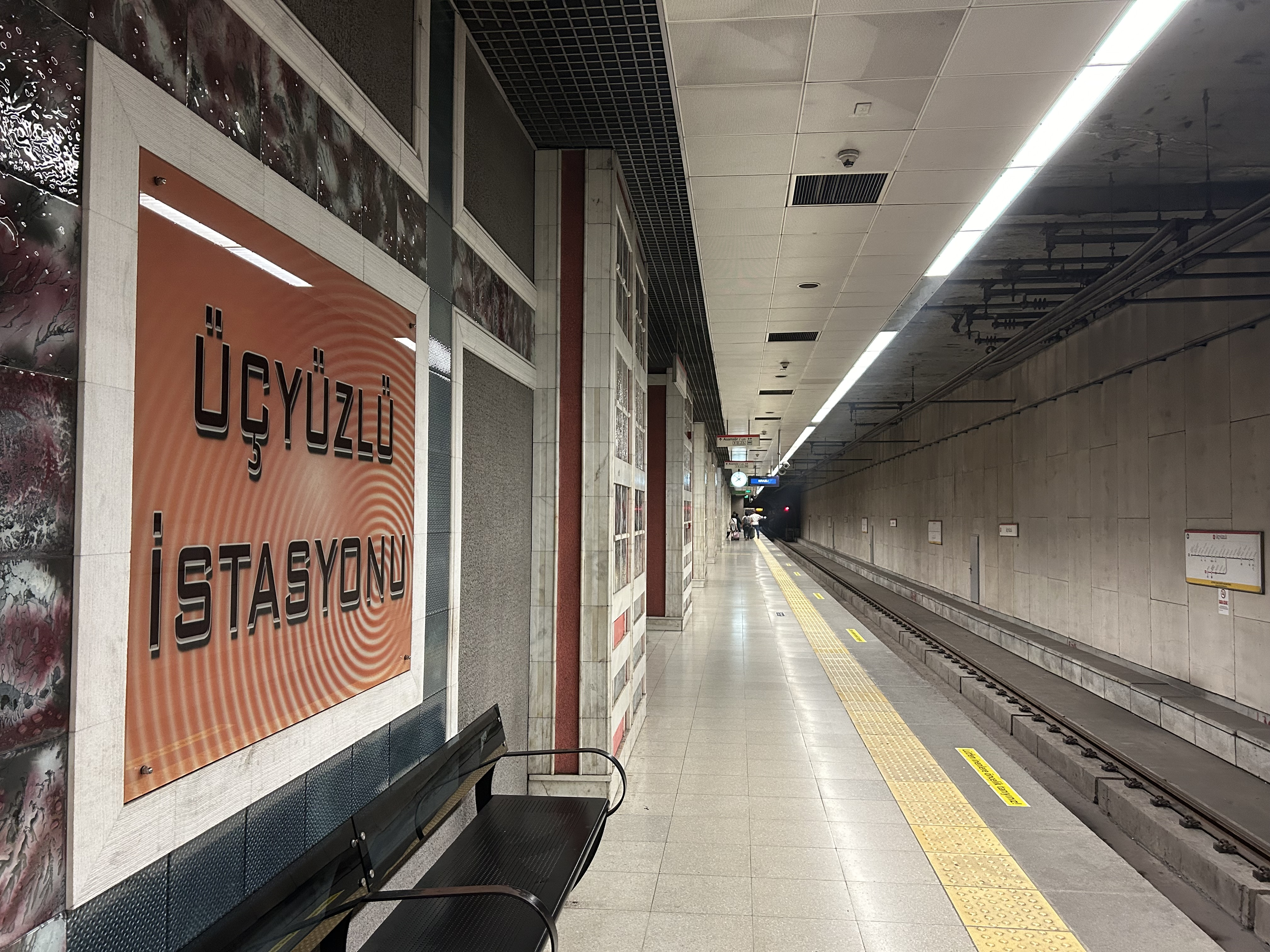
- Platform

General information
- Location: Merkez Neighborhood, Esenler Street, 34200; Bağcılar, Istanbul; Turkey
- Coordinates: 41°2′12″N 28°52′14″E
- System: Istanbul Metro rapid transit station
- Owner: Istanbul Metropolitan Municipality
- Line: M1B
- Platforms: 1 island platform
- Tracks: 2

Construction
- Structure type: Underground
- Accessible: Yes

History
- Opened: 14 June 2013
- Electrified: 750 V DC Overhead line

Services
Preceding station	Istanbul Metro	Following station
Bağcılar Meydan towards Kirazlı	M1b Line	Menderes towards Yenikapı
Location

Üçyüzlü is an underground rapid transit station on the M1B line of the Istanbul Metro. It was opened on 14 June 2013 as part of the four new stations of the M1B extension to Kirazlı.

== Layout ==
Track 2	← toward Kirazlı (Bağcılar Meydan)
Island platform, doors will open on the left
Track 1	toward Yenikapı (Menderes) →
