= Emniyet–Fatih station =

Underground station on the M1 line of the Istanbul Metro

Emniyet-Fatih
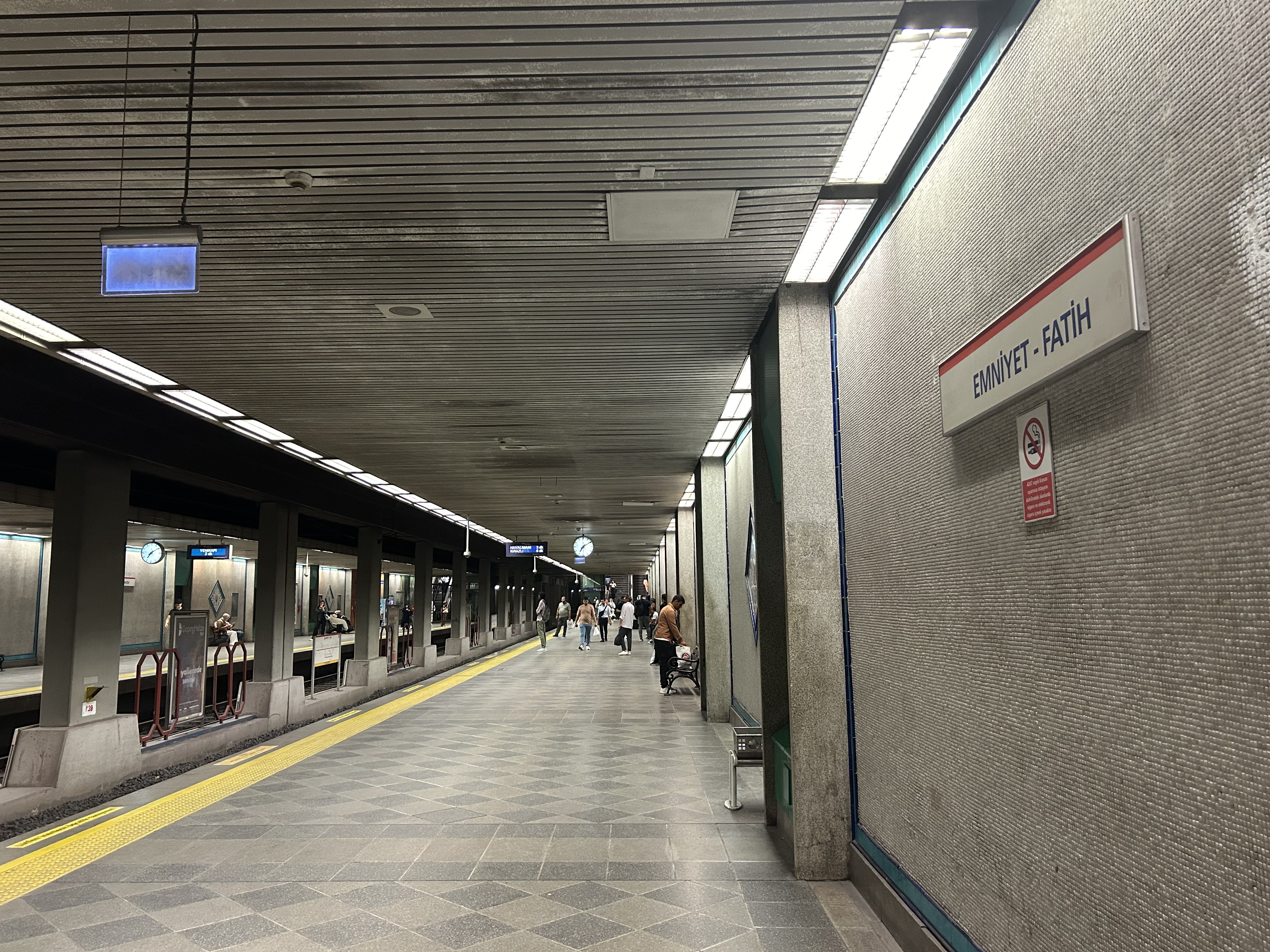

General information
- Coordinates: 41.017990°N 28.938766°E
- System: Istanbul Metro rapid transit station
- Owner: Istanbul Metropolitan Municipality
- Lines: M1A; M1B
- Platforms: 2 side platforms
- Tracks: 2
- Connections: İETT Bus: 31Y, 32T, 33TE, 38, 38Z, 50Y, 76E, 78, 78H, 79T, 88A, 89T, 91E, 92A, 97G, 146B, 146T, 336, YH-1; Istanbul Minibus: Aksaray-Güzeltepe, Aksaray-İmar Blokları, Aksaray-Karayolları, Aksaray-Vialand, Aksaray-Yıldıztabya, Pazariçi-Aksaray

Construction
- Structure type: Underground
- Accessible: Yes

History
- Opened: 3 September 1989; 36 years ago
- Electrified: 750 V DC Overhead line

Services
Preceding station	Istanbul Metro	Following station
Topkapı–Ulubatlı towards Atatürk Havalimanı	M1a Line	Aksaray towards Yenikapı
Topkapı–Ulubatlı towards Kirazlı	M1b Line	Aksaray towards Yenikapı
Location

Emniyet-Fatih is an underground station on the M1 line of the Istanbul Metro. It is located in west-central Fatih under Adnan Menderes Boulevard. Emniyet-Fatih was opened on 3 September 1989 as part of the first rapid transit line in Istanbul and Turkey and is one of the six original stations on the M1 line. The station services several important municipal buildings such as the Istanbul Police Headquarters, Fatih Municipal Building and the Istanbul Tax Offices Directorate.

== Layout ==
Side platform, doors will open on the right
Track 2	← toward Atatürk Havalimanı ← toward Kirazlı
Track 1	toward Yenikapı → toward Yenikapı →
Side platform, doors will open on the right
