= Esenler station =

Station of the Istanbul Metro

Esenler
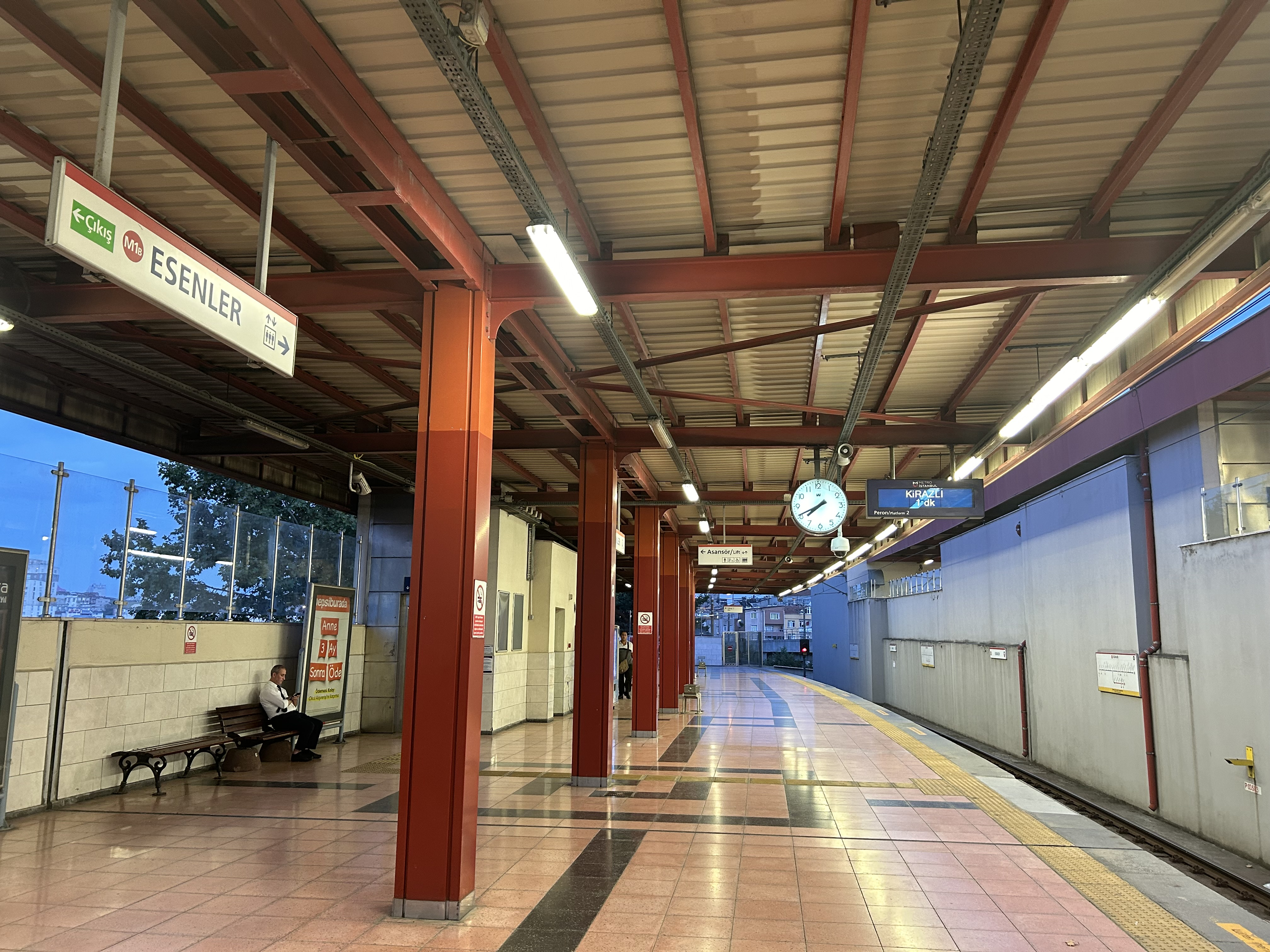
- Westbound platform

General information
- Location: Yavuz Selim Neighborhood, Otogar Bağlantı Road, 34220; Esenler, Istanbul; Turkey
- Coordinates: 41°2′15″N 28°53′19″E
- System: Istanbul Metro rapid transit station
- Owner: Istanbul Metropolitan Municipality
- Line: M1B
- Platforms: 2 side platforms
- Tracks: 2

Construction
- Structure type: At-grade
- Accessible: Yes

History
- Opened: 22 February 2012
- Electrified: 750 V DC Overhead line

Services
Preceding station	Istanbul Metro	Following station
Menderes towards Kirazlı	M1b Line	Otogar towards Yenikapı
Location

Esenler is a rapid transit station on the M1B line of the Istanbul Metro. The station is on the M1B branch of the M1 line and is the first stop west of where the M1B splits from the M1A. The station is adjacent to the Esenler maintenance facility which was originally built in 1989. Plans to bring passenger service to Esenler existed since the mid-2000s when the station was built, but the municipality wasn't able to see the plans through. Esenler station was opened to the public on 22 February 2012, as part of the new M1B branch that would extend to Kirazlı and connect with the M3.

The station design is unique as one platform is higher than the other and is in-between both tracks, despite being a side platform. This is so that the westbound track can pass over the tracks from the adjacent maintenance facility.

== Layout ==
Side platform, doors will open on the right
Track 2	← toward Kirazlı (Menderes)
Track 1	toward Yenikapı (Otogar) →
Side platform, doors will open on the right
