= M1 (Istanbul Metro) =

Rapid transit line of the Istanbul Metro

Coordinates: 41.0035°N 28.8937°E

M1 Yenikapı–Atatürk Airport/Yenikapı–Kirazlı–Halkalı
- Line M1
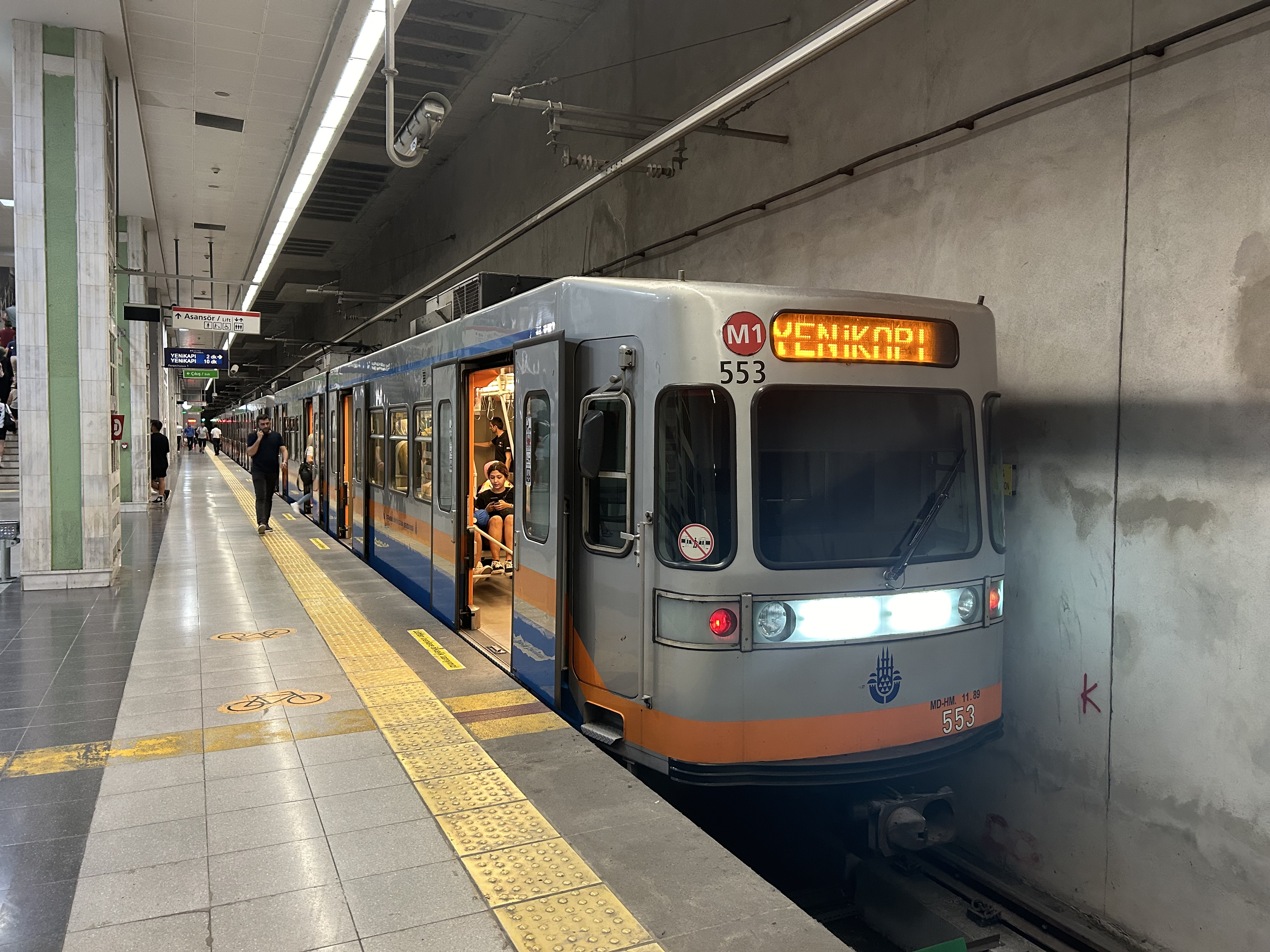

Overview
- Status: Operational; M1ᴀ (Yenikapı – Atatürk Airport); M1ʙ (Yenikapı – Kirazlı); Under Construction; M1ʙ (Kirazlı – Halkalı-Üniversite); Tendering; M1ʙ (Halkalı-Üniversite – Halkalı)
- Owner: Istanbul Metropolitan Municipality
- Locale: Istanbul, Turkey
- Termini: Yenikapı; Atatürk Airport/Kirazlı
- Stations: 23

Service
- Type: Rapid transit
- System: Istanbul Metro
- Services: 2
- Route number: M1
- Operator: Metro Istanbul A.Ş.
- Depot: Esenler
- Rolling stock: 105 ABB; 4 carriages per trainset
- Daily ridership: 400,000

History
- Opened: 3 September 1989 (37 years ago)
- Last extension: 9 November 2014 (11 years ago)

Technical
- Line length: 26.8 km (16.7 mi)
- Number of tracks: 2
- Track gauge: 1,435 mm (4 ft 8 1/2 in) standard gauge
- Electrification: 750 V DC Overhead line
- Operating speed: 70 km/h (43 mph)

Line M1, officially referred to as the M1 Yenikapı–Atatürk Airport/Kirazlı metro line (Turkish: M1 Yenikapı–Atatürk Havalimanı/Kirazlı metro hattı), also known as the Istanbul Light Metro (Turkish: Hafif Metro), is a rapid transit line of the Istanbul Metro. It is colored red on the maps and route signs. Opened in 1989, it was the first rapid transit line in Istanbul and Turkey and its opening started the revival of mass-transit in Turkish cities.

The M1 consists of two train services, M1A and M1B. Both services run on the same line from Yenikapı to Otogar, where the M1B branches off to Kirazlı, while the M1A continues on the original line to Istanbul Atatürk Airport. The M1 has 23 stations in service, of which 11 are underground and 3 elevated, and the total length of the line is 26.8 kilometers (16.7 mi). Even though the M1 is fully grade separated, it is considered a light metro line, due to the relatively low passenger capacity compared to other lines of the system.

In November 2014, the extension from Aksaray to Yenikapı was opened.

== History ==
With Istanbul's population growing and the city rapidly expanding outward, the bus service available in the city became insufficient in the 1970s and 1980s. At that time, the city did not have a mass transit rail system, except for a single 0.57 km (0.35 mi) funicular line known as Tünel – the last operating original tramline was closed in 1969. Istanbul desperately needed a rapid transit rail system to help transport its large population.

The first segment of the M1 line began service on September 3, 1989, between Aksaray and Kocatepe. On December 18, 1989, the line was extended to Esenler, but at that time the Otogar (Intercity Bus Station) was omitted. The Otogar station, and the segment between Otogar and Zeytinburnu stations on the M1A branch line, was opened on January 31, 1994. Following this, the M1A segment between Zeytinburnu and Bakırköy stations was opened on July 3 of the same year. Further extensions of the M1A line, to Ataköy and then Yenibosna stations, were opened in July and August 1995, at which point the length of the line reached approximately 16 km (9.9 mi). In 1999, a new M1A line station located between Ataköy and Bakırköy stations, the Bahçelievler station, opened. Finally, the M1A branch line was completed on December 20, 2002, when the extension to the World Trade Center and Atatürk Airport in Yeşilköy opened.

A rebuilt Esenler station opened on February 22, 2012. The extension of the M1B branch line from Esenler to Kirazlı opened on June 14, 2013.

The extension of the M1 line from Aksaray to Yenikapı was inaugurated on November 9, 2014, allowing connections with the M2 line and Marmaray commuter rail service, as well as İDO seabus service. Using the M2 and Marmaray, passenger may travel north of the Golden Horn to Taksim, Mecidiyeköy, Levent and Maslak as well as across the Bosphorus to Üsküdar and Kadıköy. İDO seabuses offer service to coastal districts of Istanbul as well as other cities and towns on the Sea of Marmara.

=== Timeline ===
Stage	Segment	Commencement	Length	Station(s)
1	Aksaray – Kocatepe	3 September 1989	6.6 km (4.10 mi)	6
1	Kocatepe – Esenler	3 December 1989	1.9 km (1.18 mi)	2
2	Otogar – Zeytinburnu	31 January 1994	4.7 km (2.92 mi)	4
2	Zeytinburnu – Bakırköy–İncirli	7 March 1994	1.4 km (0.87 mi)	1
2	Bakırköy–İncirli – Ataköy–Şirinevler	26 July 1995	2.6 km (1.62 mi)	1
2	Ataköy–Şirinevler – Yenibosna	25 August 1995	0.8 km (0.50 mi)	1
2	Bahçelievler	15 January 1999	–	1
3	Yenibosna – Atatürk Airport	20 December 2002	1.9 km (1.18 mi)	2
4	Esenler (Renovated) – Kirazlı	14 June 2013	6.0 km (3.73 mi)	4
4	Aksaray – Yenikapı	9 November 2014	0.9 km (0.56 mi)	1
5	Yenibosna (Renovated)	15 December 2022	–	1
6	Kirazlı – Halkalı-Üniversite	2029	6.2 km (3.85 mi)	5

== Operations and route ==
M1 route diagram with M1A and M1B branches.

A total of 105 trainsets transport up to 400,000 passenger daily between the operation hours from 6:00 in the early morning to 0:00 in the midnight. The M1 line has a maximum headway of 2 ½ minutes during peak hours. All stations have covered seating. A total of 135 escalators and 65 elevators make access to the stations easy for passengers.

=== M1A line ===
The M1A line is 20 kilometers (12.4 mi) long in total, and serves 18 stations. The trip between the termini stations, Yenikapı and Atatürk Airport, takes approximately 35 minutes. Daily, 169 trains run in each direction between the termini stations, with a peak-hour headway of 6 minutes.

On the M1A line, seven stations are built underground, nine are ground-level stations, and three are elevated. The stations are so structured that six of them have island platforms and eleven stations have side platforms. The connection station at Otogar in Esenler has two island platforms, which enable traffic on three tracks by the two different M1 branch lines.

=== M1B line ===
The M1B line is 14.0 kilometers (8.7 mi) long in total, and serves 13 stations. The trip between the termini stations, Yenikapı and Kirazlı, takes approximately 25 minutes. Daily, 168 trains run in each direction between the termini stations, with a peak-hour headway of 4 minutes.

On the M1B line, eight stations are built underground and five are ground-level stations. The stations are so structured that eight of them have island platforms and four stations have side platforms. The connection station at Otogar in Esenler has two island platforms, which enable traffic on three tracks by the two different M1 branch lines.

== Stations ==
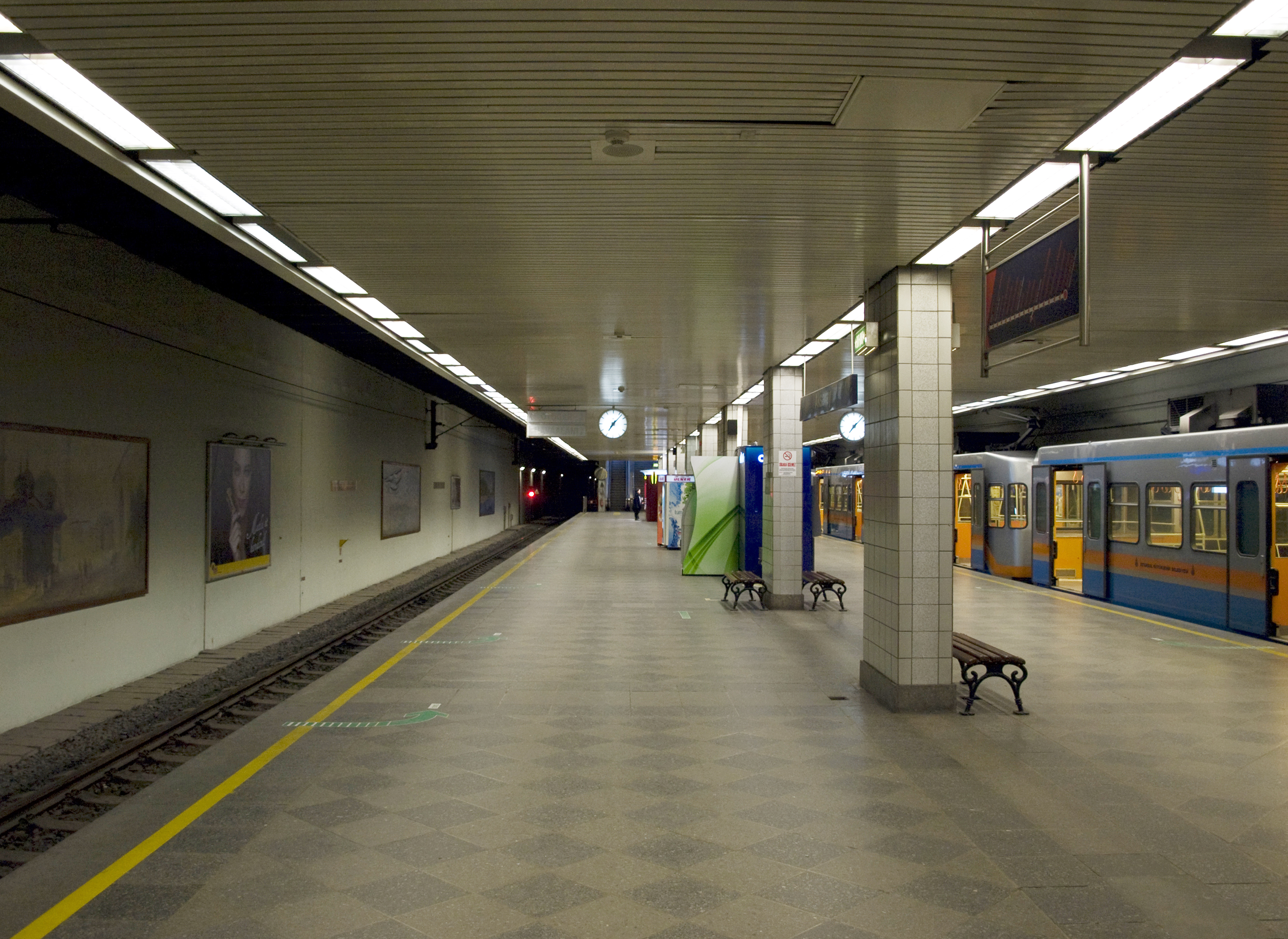
Aksaray station

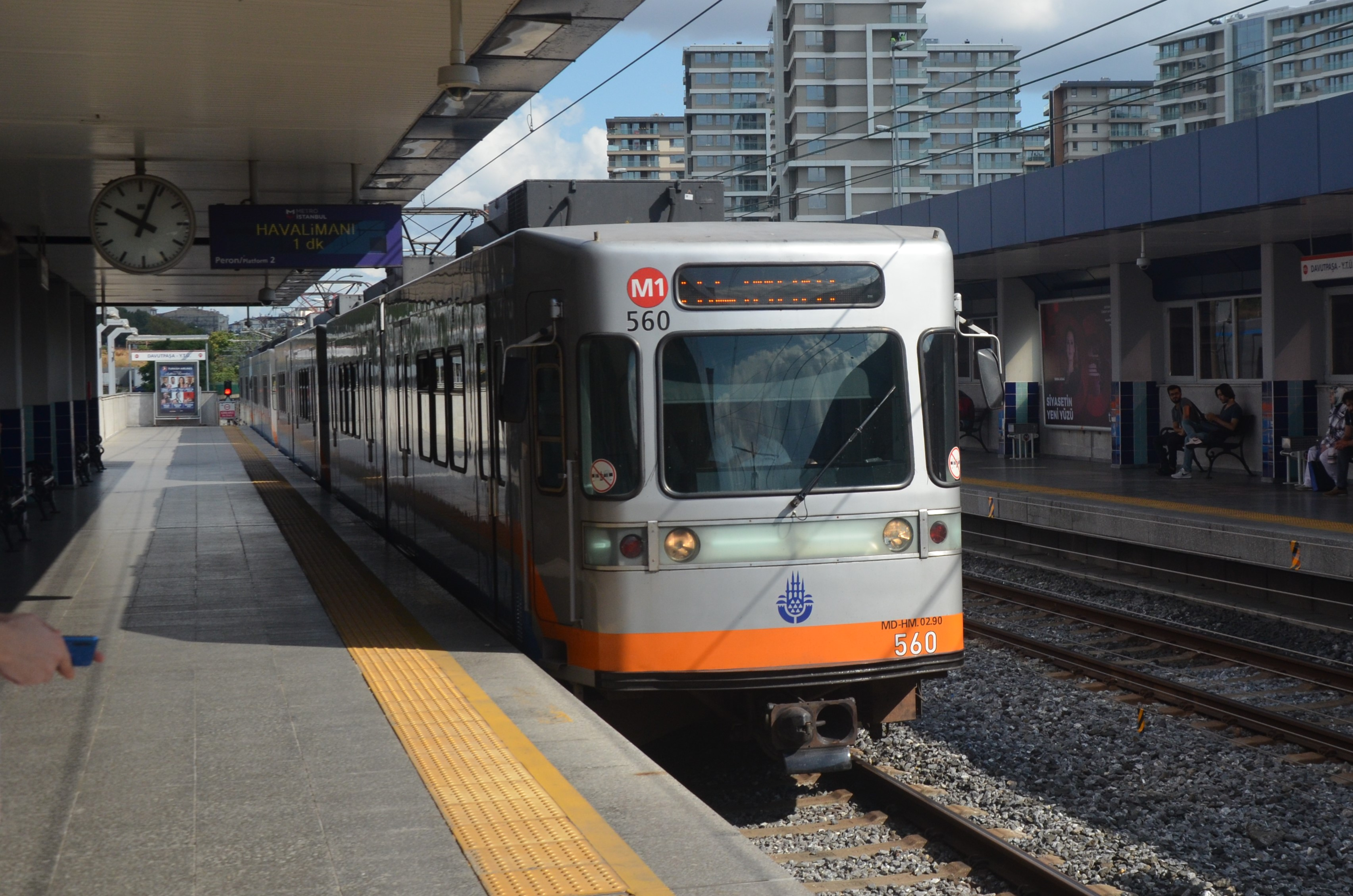
Atatürk Airport-bound Istanbul Metro line M1 train at Davutpaşa station.

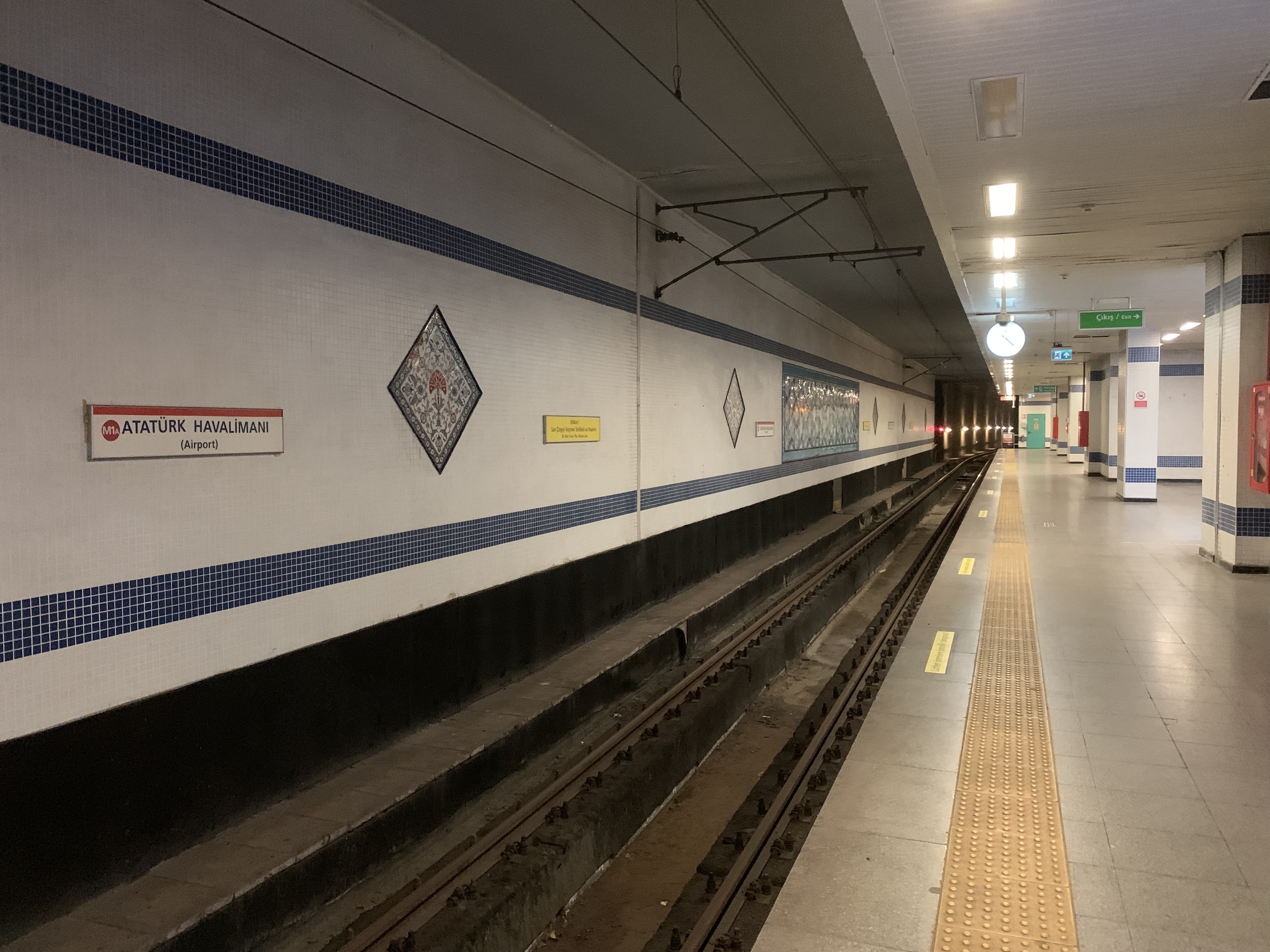
Atatürk Havalimanı station, the terminus (serving Istanbul Atatürk Airport), has buffer stops at end of the platform

=== M1 trunk section (served by both the M1A and M1B lines) ===
Station	District	Transfer	Notes
Yenikapı	Fatih	・・・ (Yenikapı Terminal); İETT Bus: 30D, 31, 31Y, 50Y, 70FY, 70KY, 72YT, 76A, 77, 88A, 146T, 336Y	Yenikapı event space
Aksaray	Fatih	(Yusufpaşa station); İETT Bus: 31Y, 32T, 33E, 33TE, 38, 38Z, 50Y, 76A, 78, 78H, 79GE, 79T, 88A, 89T, 91E, 97G, 97GE, 142E, 146B, 146T, 336, E-59	
Emniyet-Fatih	Fatih	İETT Bus: 31Y, 32T, 33E, 33TE, 38, 38Z, 50Y, 76A, 78, 78H, 79GE, 79T, 88A, 89T, 91E, 97G, 97GE, 142E, 146B, 146T, 336, E-59	
Topkapı-Ulubatlı	Fatih	(Vatan station); İETT Bus: 31Y, 32T, 33E, 33TE, 38, 38Z, 50Y, 76A, 78, 78H, 79GE, 79T, 88A, 89T, 91E, 97G, 97GE, 142E, 146B, 146T, 336, E-59	Park and Ride facility
Bayrampaşa-Maltepe	Eyüpsultan	İETT Bus: 32, 32A, 32T, 33M, 36, 36CB, 36ES, 50R, 55Y, 88	Axis Mall
Sağmalcılar	Bayrampaşa	İETT Bus: 32, 32A, 32M, 32T	Bayrampaşa State Hospital
Kocatepe	Bayrampaşa	İETT Bus: HT5, HT6	Forum İstanbul Mall
Otogar	Bayrampaşa	İETT Bus: 50R, 76O, 303B	Bayrampaşa Grand İstanbul Bus Station

=== M1A branch ===
Station	District	Transfer	Notes
Terazidere	Esenler		
Davutpaşa–YTÜ	Güngören	İETT Bus: 33B, 41AT, 85C, 92B, 92C	Yıldız Technical University
Merter	Güngören	İETT Bus: 31, 31E, 50B, 71T, 72T, 73, 73F, 76D, 79Ş, 82, 85T, 89, 89B, 89K, 92, 92T, 97, 97A, 97BT, 97T, H-9	Park and Ride facility
Zeytinburnu	Bakırköy	・ İETT Bus: 31, 31E, 50B, 71T, 72T, 73, 73F, 76D, 78ZB, 79G, 79Ş, 82, 89A, 89B, 89K, 89M, 92, 93, 93C, 93M, 93T, 97, 97A, 97B, 97BT, 97KZ, 97T, H-9, MK97, MR10	
Bakırköy-İncirli	Bakırköy	İETT Bus: 31, 31E, 50B, 71T, 72T, 73, 73F, 76D, 78ZB, 79G, 79Ş, 82, 89, 89A, 89B, 89K, 89M, 89S, 92, 97, 97A, 97BT, 97E, 97KZ, 97T, H-9, HT13, MK97	
Bahçelievler	Bahçelievler	İETT Bus: 31, 31E, 36CY, 73, 73B, 73F, 73H, 73Y, 76, 76B, 76C, 76D, 76V, 76Y, 78ZB, 79B, 79G, 79Ş, 82, 89, 89A, 89B, 89K, 89M, 89S, 89YB, 97, 97BT, 97E, 97KZ, 98, 98A, 98AB, 98B, 98H, 98M, 98MB, 98S, 98T, 98TB, 146, E-57, H-9, HT13	
Ataköy–Şirinevler	Bakırköy	İETT Bus: 31, 31E, 36CY, 55Y, 73, 73B, 73F, 73H, 73Y, 76, 76B, 76C, 76D, 76V, 76Y, 78ZB, 79B, 79G, 79Ş, 82, 89, 89A, 89B, 89K, 89M, 89S, 89YB, 97, 97BT, 97E, 97KZ, 98, 98A, 98AB, 98B, 98H, 98M, 98MB, 98S, 98T, 98TB, 146, E-57, H-9, HT10, HT11, HT13, MR20	Park and Ride facility
Yenibosna	Bakırköy	İETT Bus: 36AY, 36CY, 55Y, 73, 78B, 79F, 79FY, 79K, 79Y, 82S, HS1, HT10, HT12, HT20, KÇ2, MR20	
DTM–İstanbul Fuar Merkezi	Bakırköy		Istanbul World Trade Center and Istanbul Expo Center
Atatürk Havalimanı	Bakırköy		Atatürk Airport

=== M1B branch ===
Station	District	Transfer	Notes
Esenler	Esenler	İETT Bus: 33, 33M, 55Y, 75O, 76O, 85T, 303B	Metro Istanbul HQ - Depot
Menderes	Esenler	İETT Bus: 33, 33M, 55Y, 85T, 98G	
Üçyüzlü	Bağcılar	İETT Bus: 33B, 36CY, 55Y, 85T, 92M, 98G, HT1	
Bağcılar Meydan	Bağcılar	(Bağcılar Merkez station); İETT Bus: 36CY, 92, 92B, 92K, 92Ş, 97G, 98D, 98Y, HT1	300m walk between lines
Kirazlı	Bağcılar	İETT Bus: 92K, 98K, HT10, MK42	
↓↓ Under Construction (inauguration planned in 2029) ↓↓
Barbaros	Bağcılar	İETT Bus: 78ZB, 97, 97E, 98A, 98M, HT13	
Malazgirt	Bağcılar	İETT Bus: 97KZ, 98E, HT12	
Mimar Sinan	Bağcılar	İETT Bus: 97, 97GE, 97M, 97KZ, 98E, HT1, HT12, MK22	
Fatih	Küçükçekmece	İETT Bus: 89K, 98AB, KÇ2, MR42	
Halkalı-Üniversite	Küçükçekmece	İETT Bus: 36AS, 760, 76V, 79Y, 89, 89BS, 89F, 89K, 89S, 98, 98AB, 98KM, 98S, HT20, KÇ2, MR42	
↓↓ In Tender Phase (inauguration planned after 2030) ↓↓
Mehmet Akif Ersoy	Küçükçekmece	İETT Bus: 36AS, 76V, 79G, 79Ş, 89A, 89K, 89YB, 98AB, 141K, 141M, BN1, H-3, HT1, HT20, KÇ2, MK16, MK31, MR42	
Yenidoğan	Küçükçekmece	İETT Bus: 36AS, 76V, 79G, 79Ş, 89A, 89K, 89YB, 98AB, 141K, 141M, BN1, H-3, HT1, HT20, KÇ2, MK16, MK31, MR42	
Bezirganbahçe	Küçükçekmece	İETT Bus: 76V, BN1, H-3, MK16, MR42	
Halkalı	Küçükçekmece	・・・ İETT Bus: 79Y, 89A, 143, BN1, H-3, MR40, MR42, MR50, MR51	

As of December 2025, a 9.7 km (6.0 mi) extension to a new terminus station at Halkalı is under construction. It will add nine stations to the M1B branch, west of Kirazlı offering an interchange with the Marmaray, M11, and M9 lines. The section between Kirazlı and Halkalı University is expected to open in 2029, with construction of the remaining section to Halkalı put on hold due to difficulties in land acquisition.

== Rolling stock ==
Since this line is the oldest modern rail line in İstanbul, it has relatively old vehicles, produced by Asea Brown Boveri and SGP Verkehrstechnik in Graz, Austria in the late-1980s. The vehicles reach a maximum speed of 80 km/h (50 mph) with an acceleration of 0.7 m/s^{2}. It is planned to replace the current rolling stock with a new domestically produced one in the future.

== See also ==
- Istanbul modern tramways – Separate modern tramways (T1, T4 & T5) of Istanbul
- Istanbul nostalgic tramways – Two separate heritage tramways of Istanbul
- Trams in Istanbul (1871-1966) – the first generation tramway network
- Marmaray
- Public transport in Istanbul – includes information on trams
- EsTram (Eskisehir)
- Antalya trams
- Kayseri tram (Kayseray)
