= Bağcılar Meydan station =

Station of the Istanbul Metro

Bağcılar Meydan
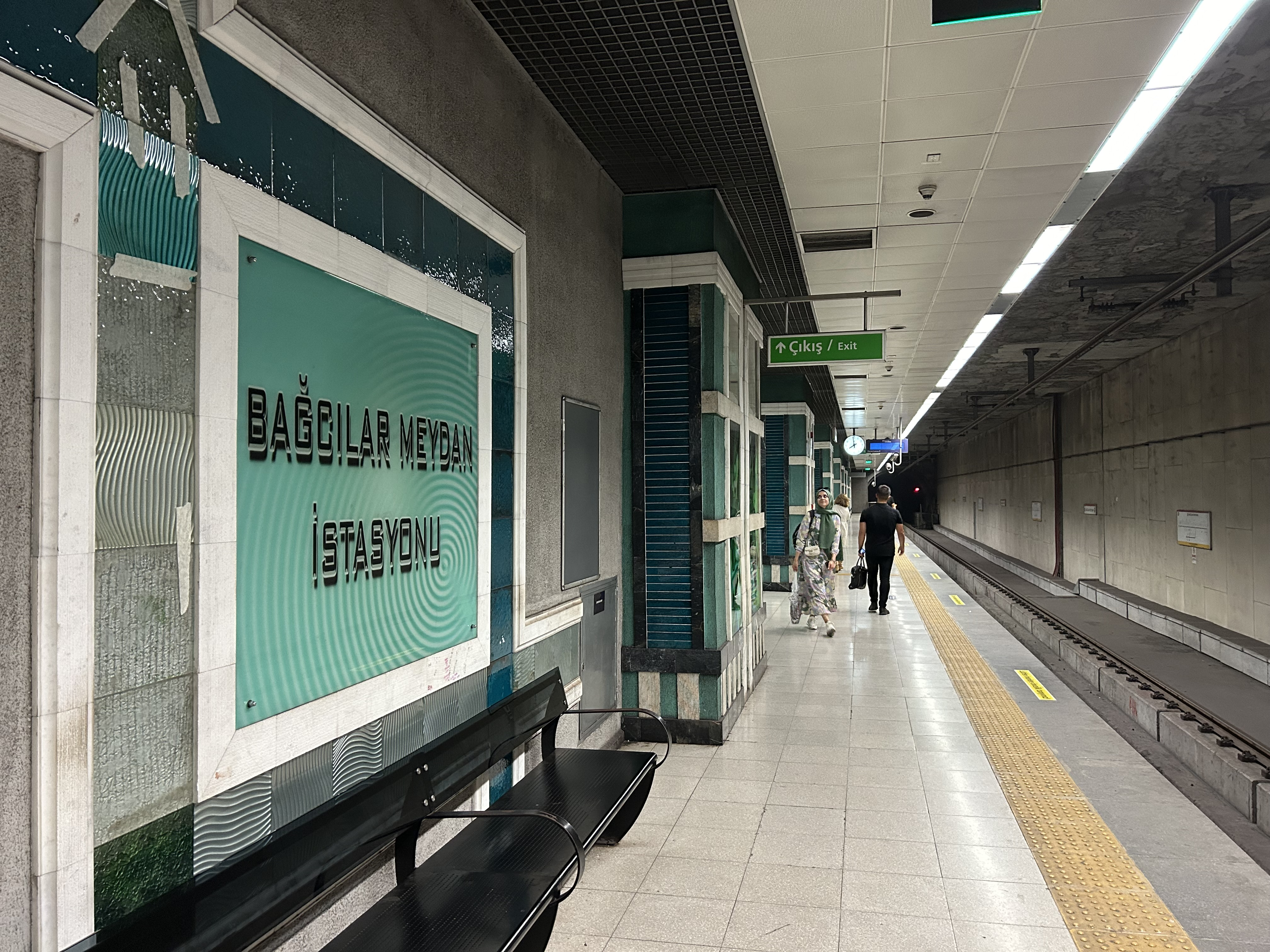
- Platform

General information
- Location: Sancaktepe Neighborhood, Çarşı Street, 34200; Bağcılar, Istanbul; Turkey
- Coordinates: 41°2′5″N 28°51′23″E
- System: Istanbul Metro rapid transit station
- Owner: Istanbul Metropolitan Municipality
- Line: M1B
- Platforms: 1 island platform
- Tracks: 2
- Connections: Istanbul Tram: T1 at Bağcılar

Construction
- Structure type: Underground
- Accessible: Yes

History
- Opened: 14 June 2013
- Electrified: 750 V DC Overhead line

Services
Preceding station	Istanbul Metro	Following station
Kirazlı Terminus	M1b Line	Üçyüzlü towards Yenikapı
Location

Bağcılar Meydan is an underground rapid transit station on the M1B line of the Istanbul Metro. It was opened on 14 June 2013 as part of the four new stations of the M1B extension to Kirazlı. The station is in the vicinity of the Bağcılar tram station, which is serviced by the T1 line to Zeytinburnu and Kabataş.

== Layout ==
Track 2	← toward Kirazlı (terminus})
Island platform, doors will open on the left
Track 1	toward Yenikapı (Üçyüzlü) →
