= Molla Gürani station =

Station of the Istanbul Metro

Molla Gürani
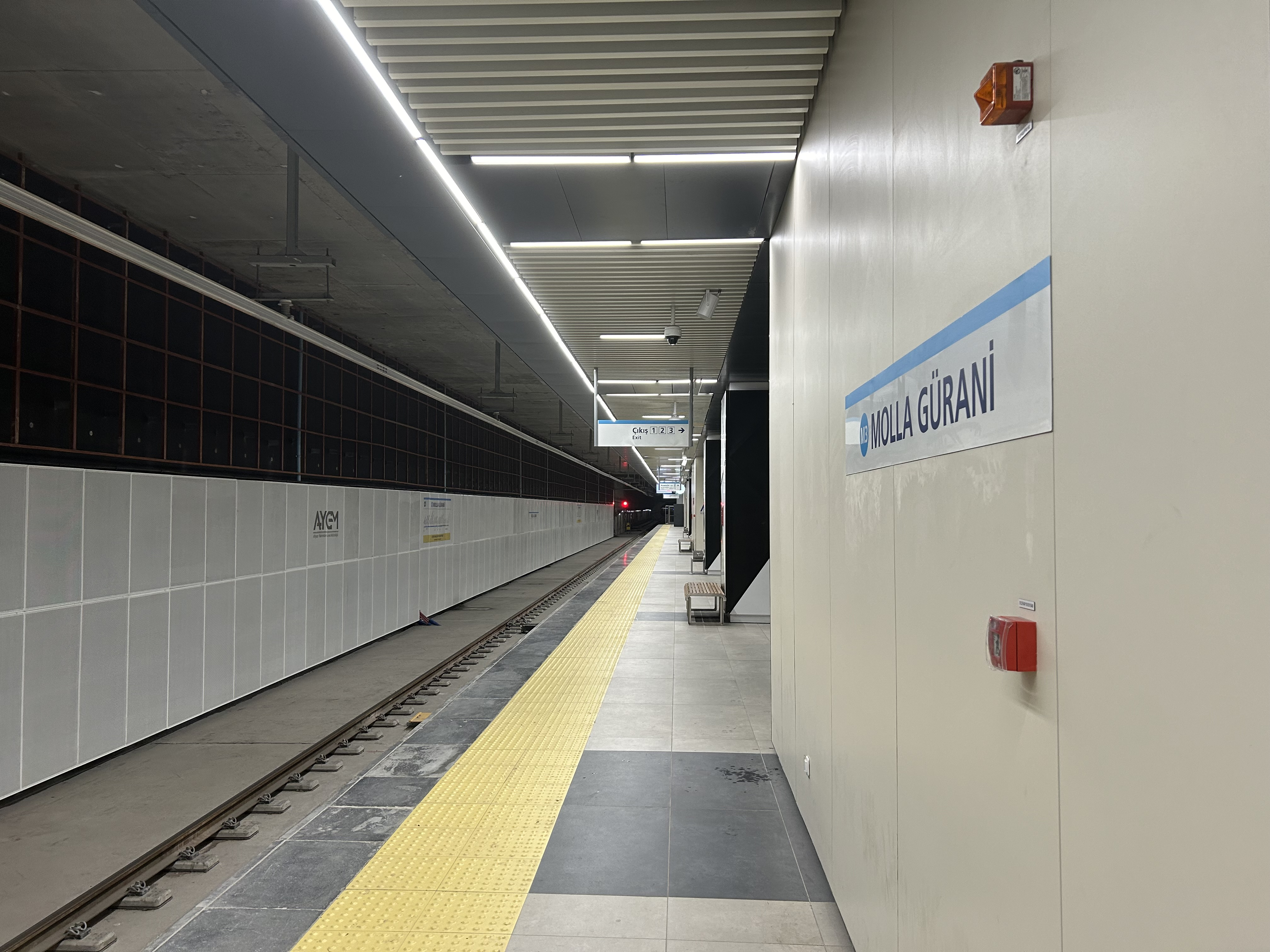
- Platform

General information
- Location: İnönü Neighborhood, Mehmet Akif Boulevard, 34203; Bağcılar, Istanbul; Turkey
- Coordinates: 41°1′34″N 28°50′52″E
- System: Istanbul Metro rapid transit station
- Owner: Istanbul Metropolitan Municipality
- Line: M3
- Platforms: 1 Island platform
- Tracks: 2
- Connections: İETT Bus: 98K, HT10, HT11; Istanbul Minibus: Kocasinan Mahallesi – Bakırköy, Bakırköy Metro – Barbaros Mahallesi, Topkapı – Otocenter, Giyimkent – Şirinevler

Construction
- Structure type: Underground
- Parking: No
- Cycle facilities: Yes
- Accessible: Yes

History
- Opened: 10 March 2024 (2 years ago)
- Electrified: 1,500 V DC Overhead line

Services
Preceding station	Istanbul Metro	Following station
Kirazlı towards Kayaşehir Merkez	M3 Line	Yıldıztepe towards Bakırköy Sahil
Location

Molla Gürani is an underground station on the M3 line of the Istanbul Metro. It is located under Mehmet Akif Boulevard in the İnönü neighborhood of Bağcılar. It was opened on 10 March 2024, with the opening of the M3 extension from Kirazlı to Bakırköy Sahil.

== Layout ==
Northbound	← toward Kayaşehir Merkez (Kirazlı)
Island platform, doors will open on the left
Southbound	toward Bakırköy Sahil (Yıldıztepe) →

== Operation information ==
The line operates between 06:00 and 00:00 and train frequency is 7 minutes at peak hours and 10 minutes at all other times. The line has no night service.

== Gallery ==
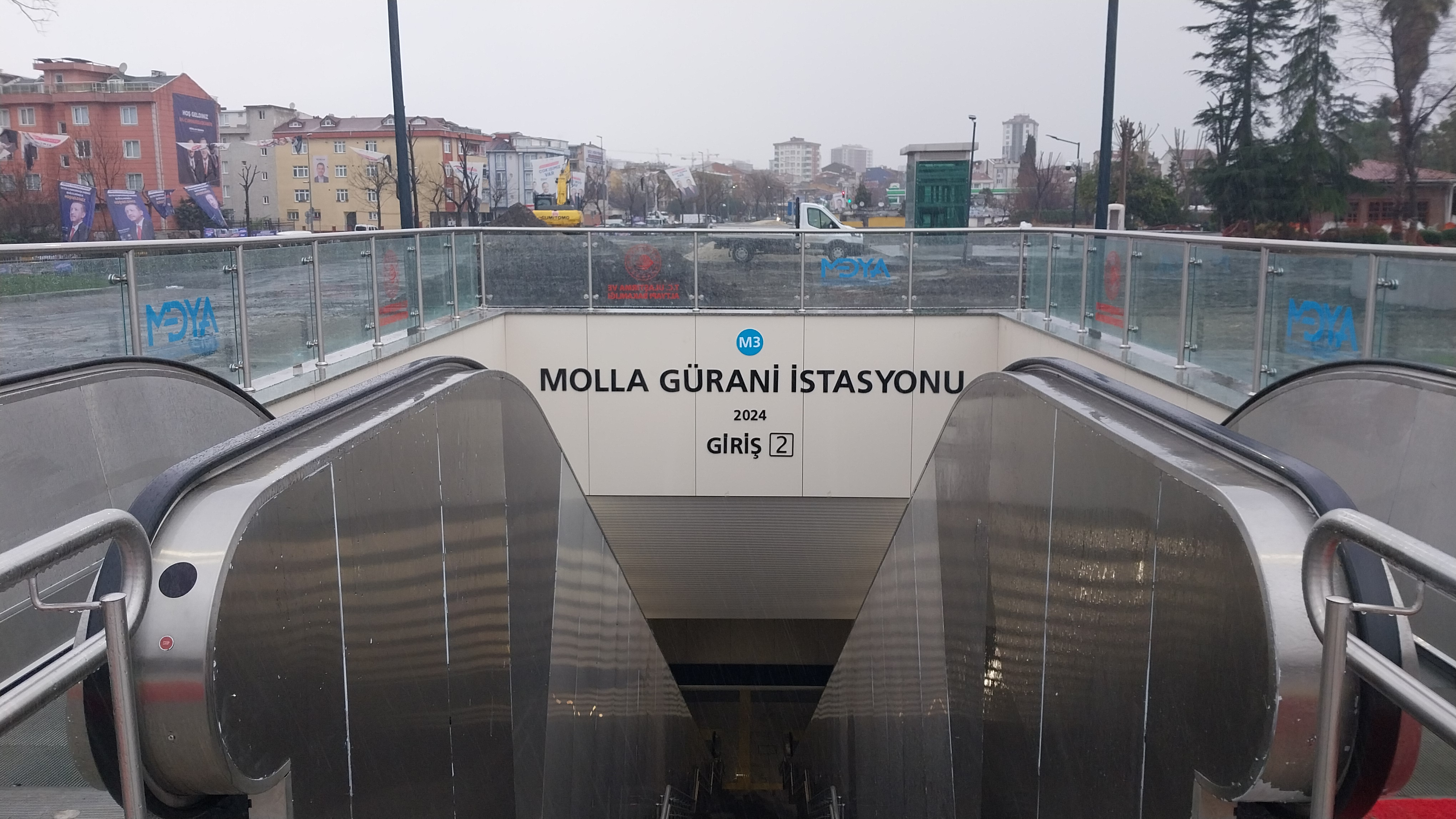
Entrance 2

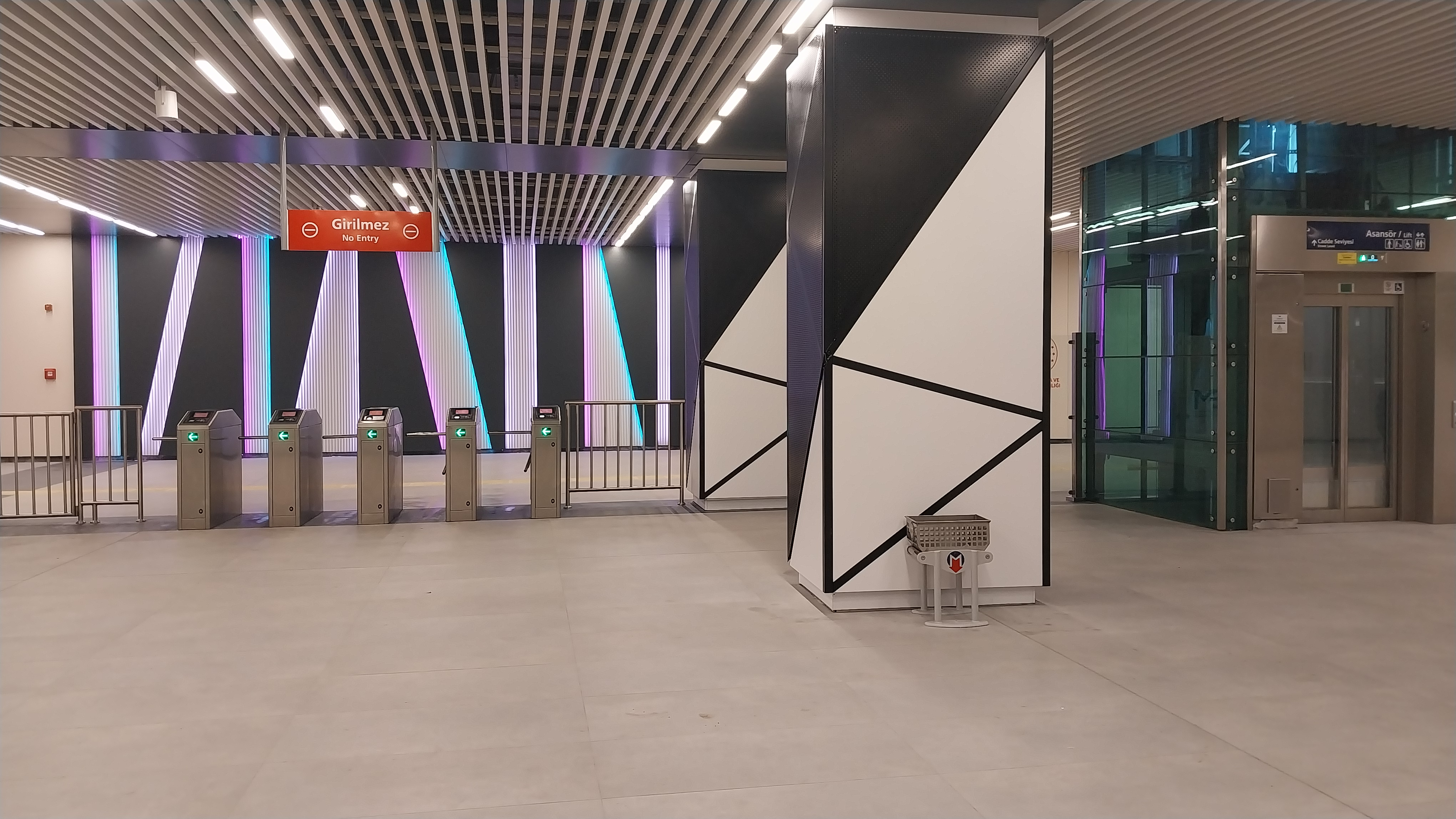
Ticket hall

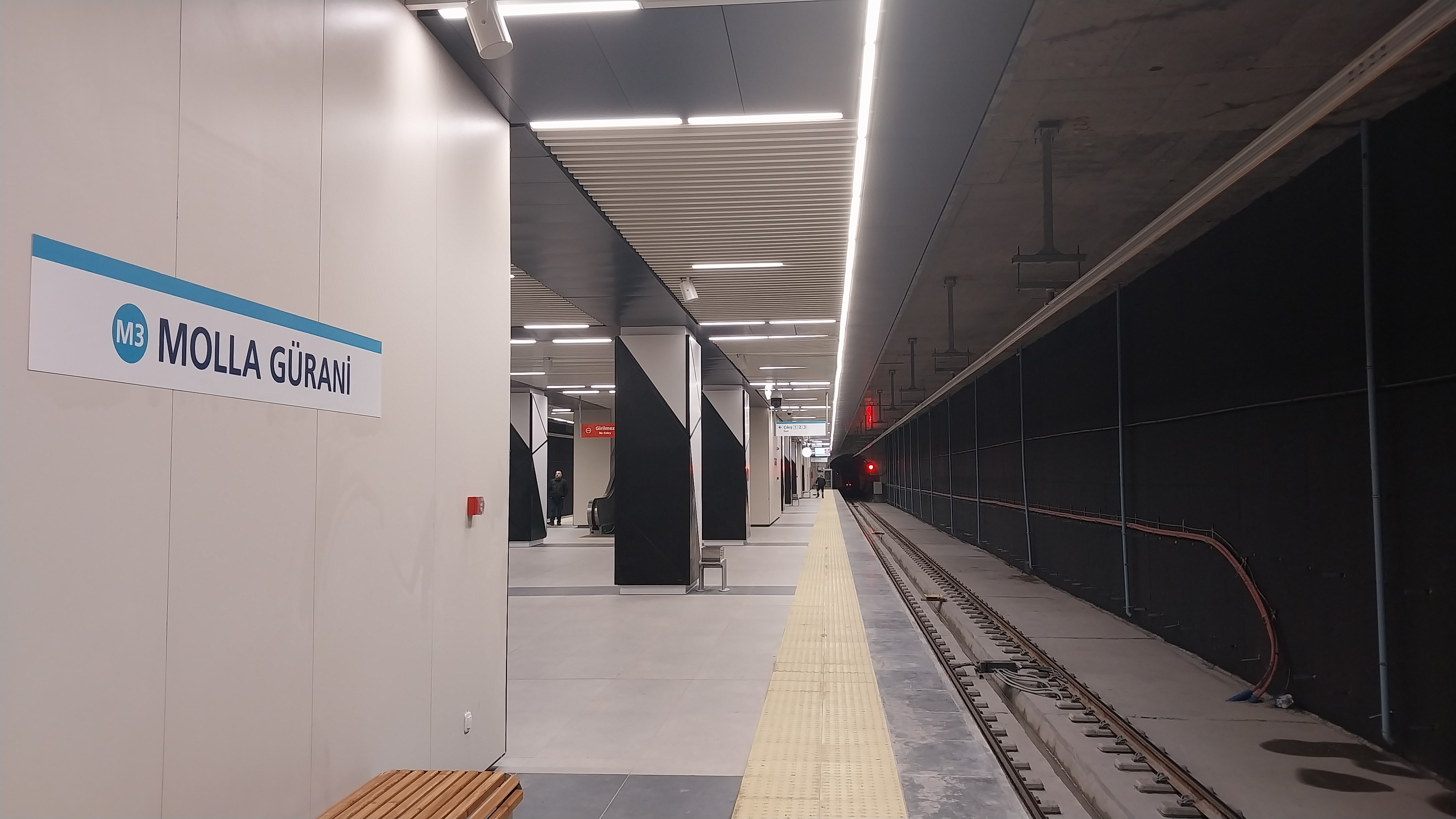
Platform
