= Kirazlı station =

Station of the Istanbul Metro

Kirazlı (M1) Kirazlı (M3)
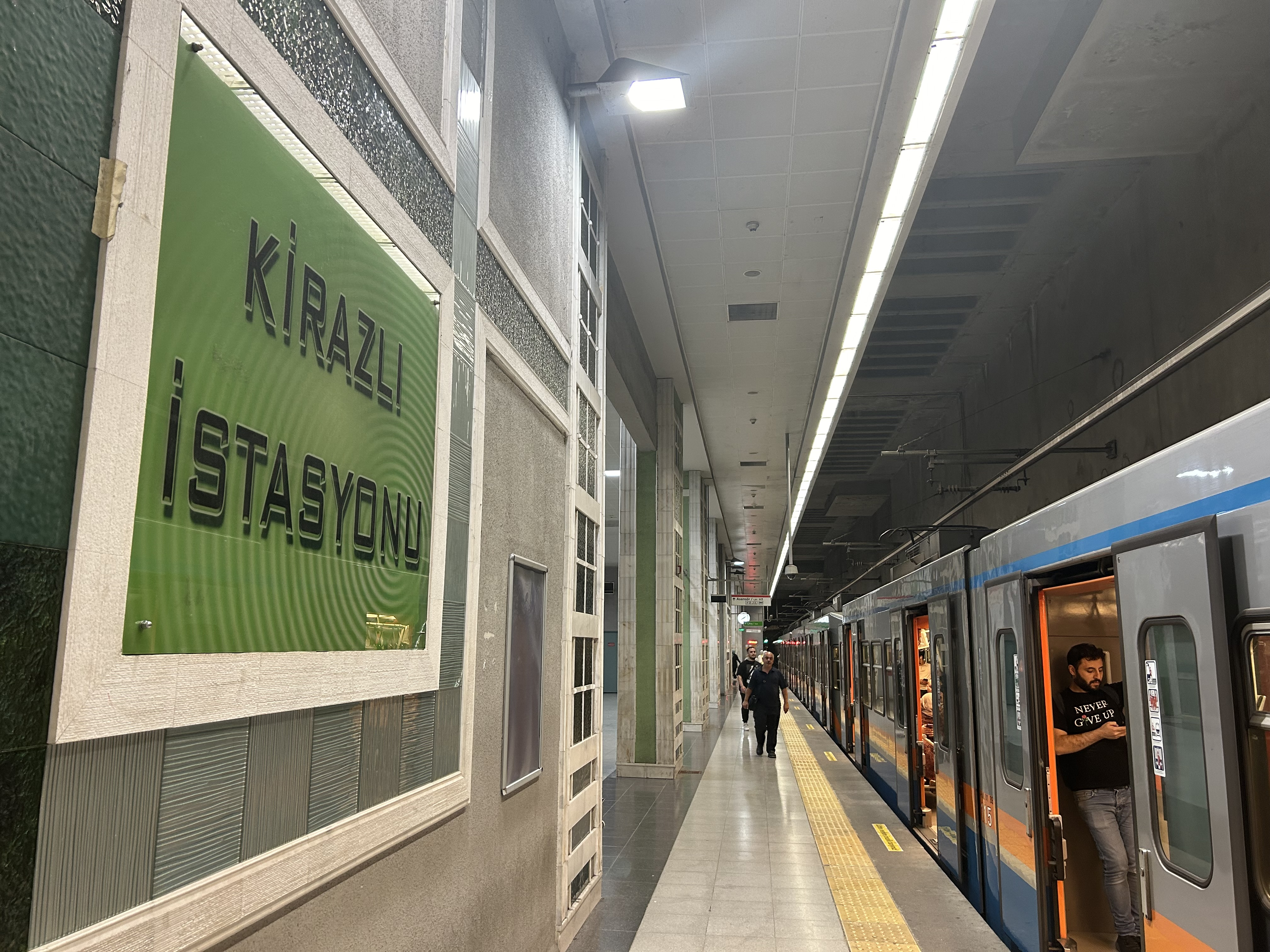
- M1B platform

General information
- Location: Kirazlı Neighborhood, Hoca Ahmet Yesevi Street, 34210; Bağcılar, Istanbul; Turkey
- Coordinates: 41°1′55″N 28°50′32″E
- System: Istanbul Metro rapid transit complex
- Owner: Istanbul Metropolitan Municipality
- Lines: M1B; M3
- Platforms: 1 island platform (M1B); 1 island platform (M3)
- Tracks: 2 (M1B); 2 (M3)
- Connections: İETT Bus: 92K, 98K, HT10, HT13, MK42; Istanbul Minibus: Bakırköy Metro-Evren Mahallesi, Bakırköy-Barbaros, Bakırköy-İstoç

Construction
- Structure type: Underground
- Parking: No
- Cycle facilities: Yes
- Accessible: Yes

History
- Opened: 14 June 2013; 13 years ago
- Electrified: 750 V DC Overhead line (M1B); 1,500 V DC Overhead line (M3)

Services
Preceding station	Istanbul Metro	Following station
Terminus	M1b Line	Bağcılar Meydan towards Yenikapı
Yenimahalle towards Kayaşehir Merkez	M3 Line	Molla Gürani towards Bakırköy Sahil
Future services
Preceding station	Istanbul Metro	Following station
Barbaros towards Halkalı-Üniversite	M1b Line	Bağcılar Meydan towards Yenikapı
Location

Kirazlı, or Kirazlı-Bağcılar, is an underground rapid transit complex of the Istanbul Metro and is serviced by lines M1B and M3.

Kirazlı opened on 14 June 2013 as the southern terminus of the M3 line and eastern terminus of the M1B line. Since the M3 is considered a "continuation" of the M1B, passengers can transfer between these two lines for free. Kirazlı is the only station that offers free transfer in Istanbul. This practice ended on 10 March 2024 with the opening of the M3 extension to Bakırköy Sahil. The station was inaugurated with a large ceremony in which officials from the Istanbul Municipality and Istanbul Ulaşım took part.

On January 12, 2017, Lakhe Mashrapov, a man convicted of the 2017 Istanbul nightclub shooting was seen in the station and service to the station was suspended due to a search in an attempt to find him.

== Layout ==
M1 platform

Eastbound	toward Yenikapı (Bağcılar Meydan) →
Island platform, doors will open on the left or right
Eastbound	toward Yenikapı (Bağcılar Meydan) →

M3 platform

Northbound	← toward Kayaşehir Merkez (Yenimahalle)
Island platform, doors will open on the left
Southbound	toward Bakırköy Sahil (Molla Gürani) →

== Operation information ==
=== M3 ===
The M3 line operates between 06:00 and 00:00 and train frequency is 7 minutes at peak hours and 10 minutes at all other times. The line has no night service.

== Gallery ==
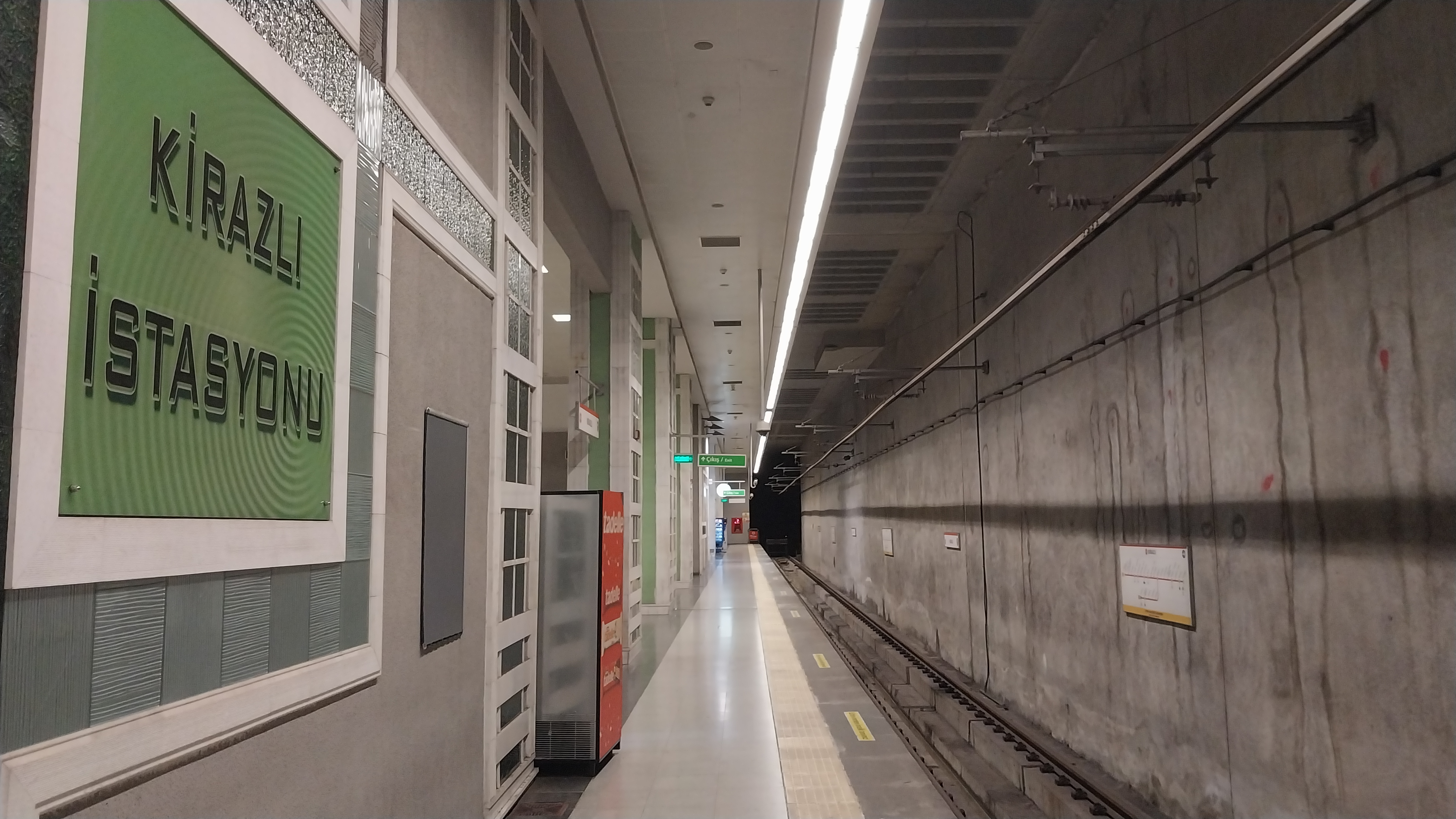
M1B platform

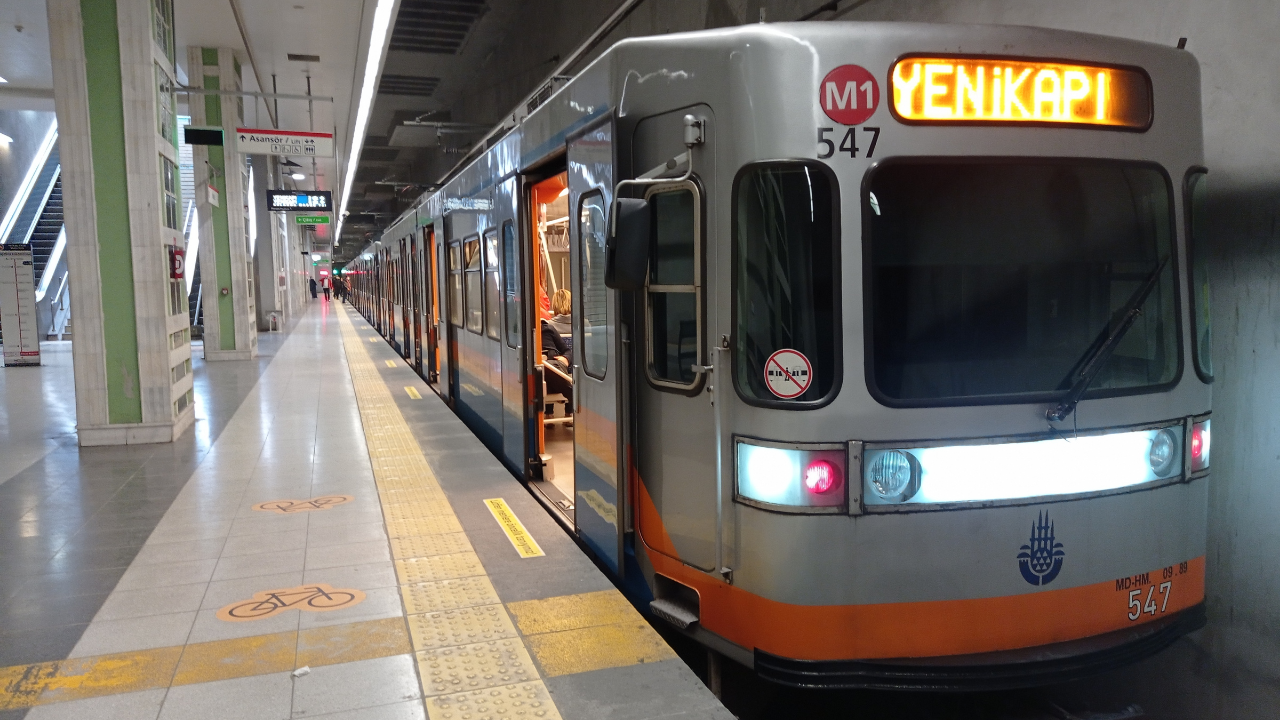
ABB branded train

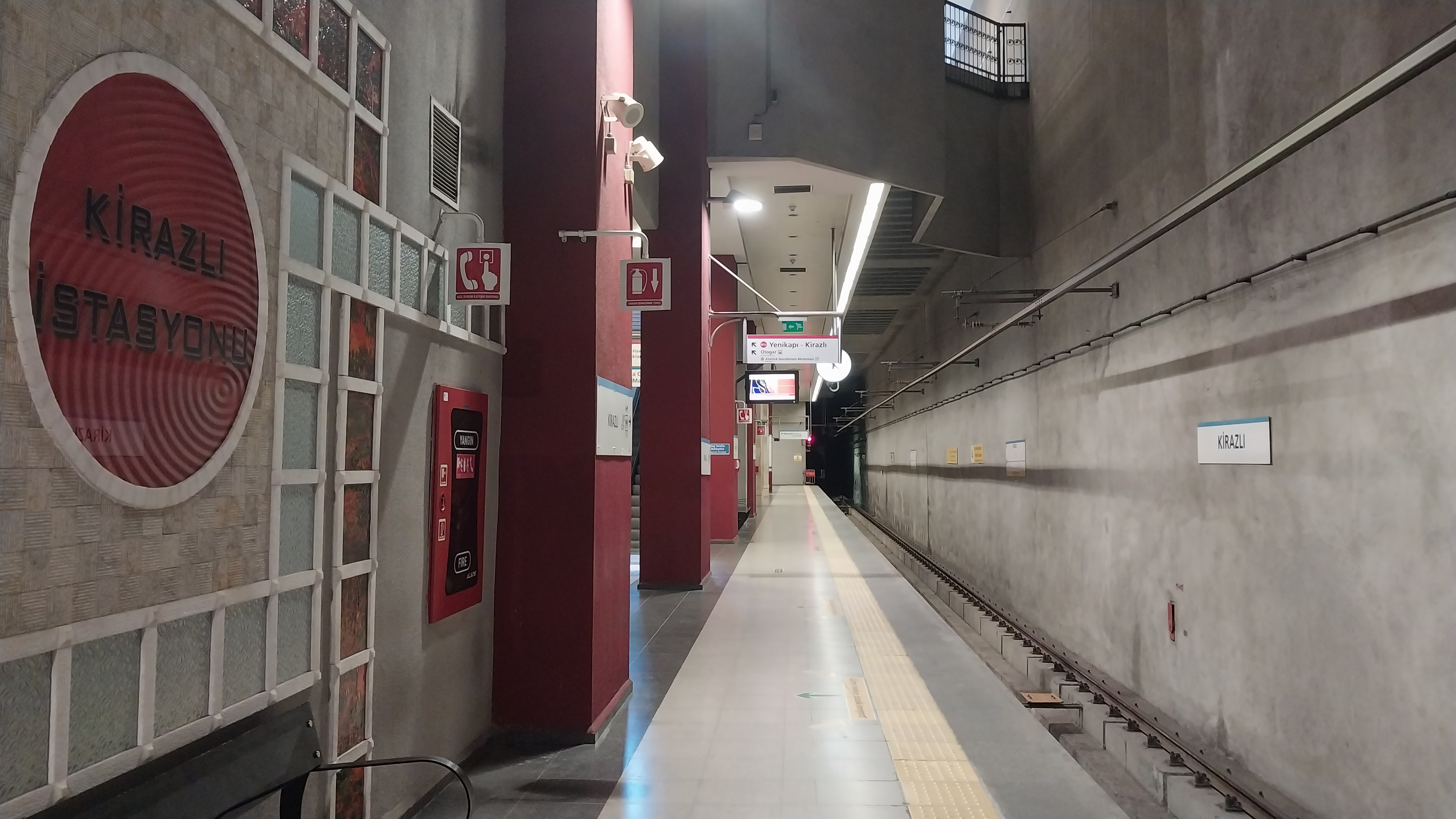
M3 platform

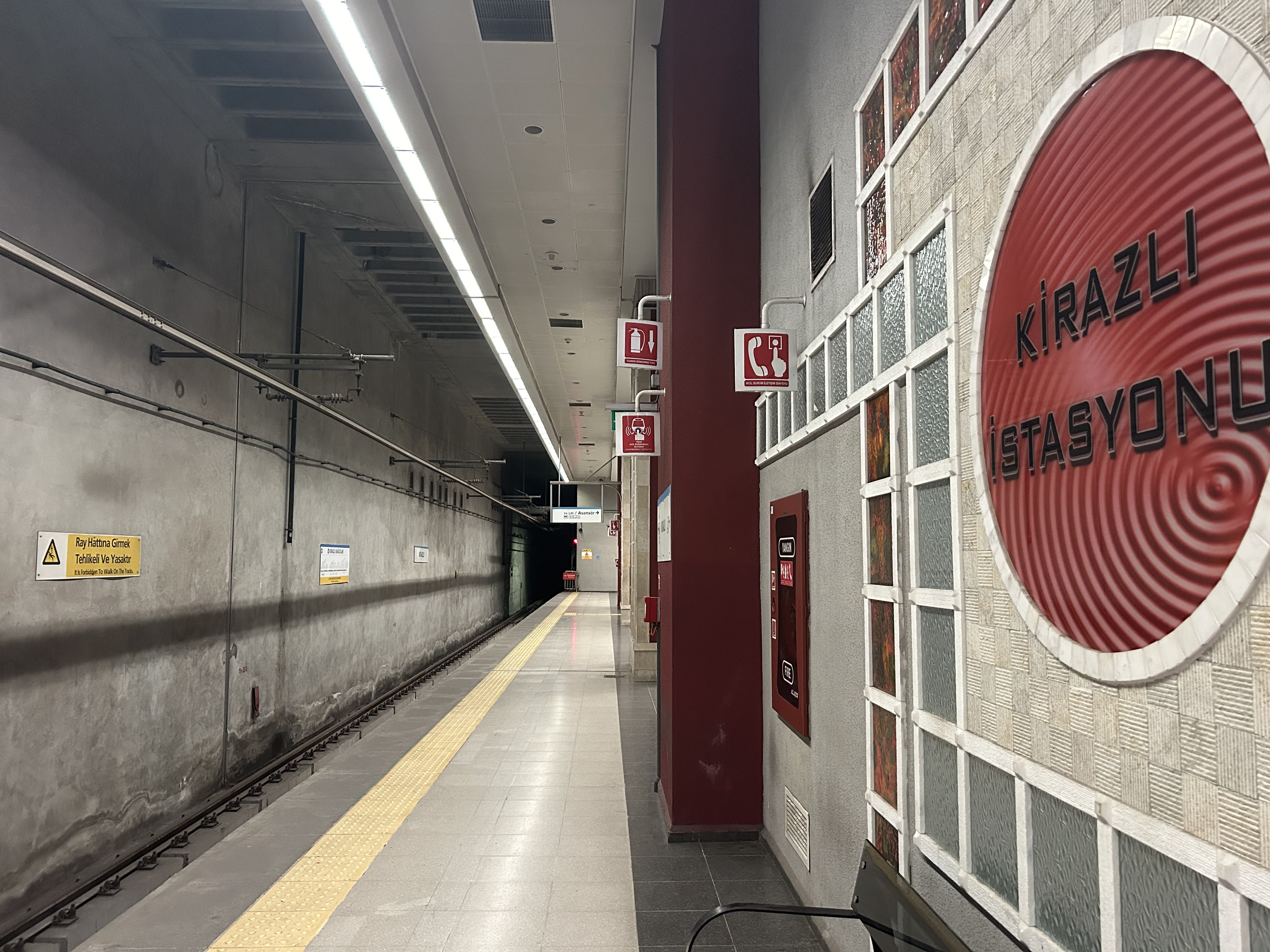
M3 platform in 2024
