= Bakırköy–İncirli station =

Station of the Istanbul Metro

Bakırköy—İncirli (M1) İncirli (M3)
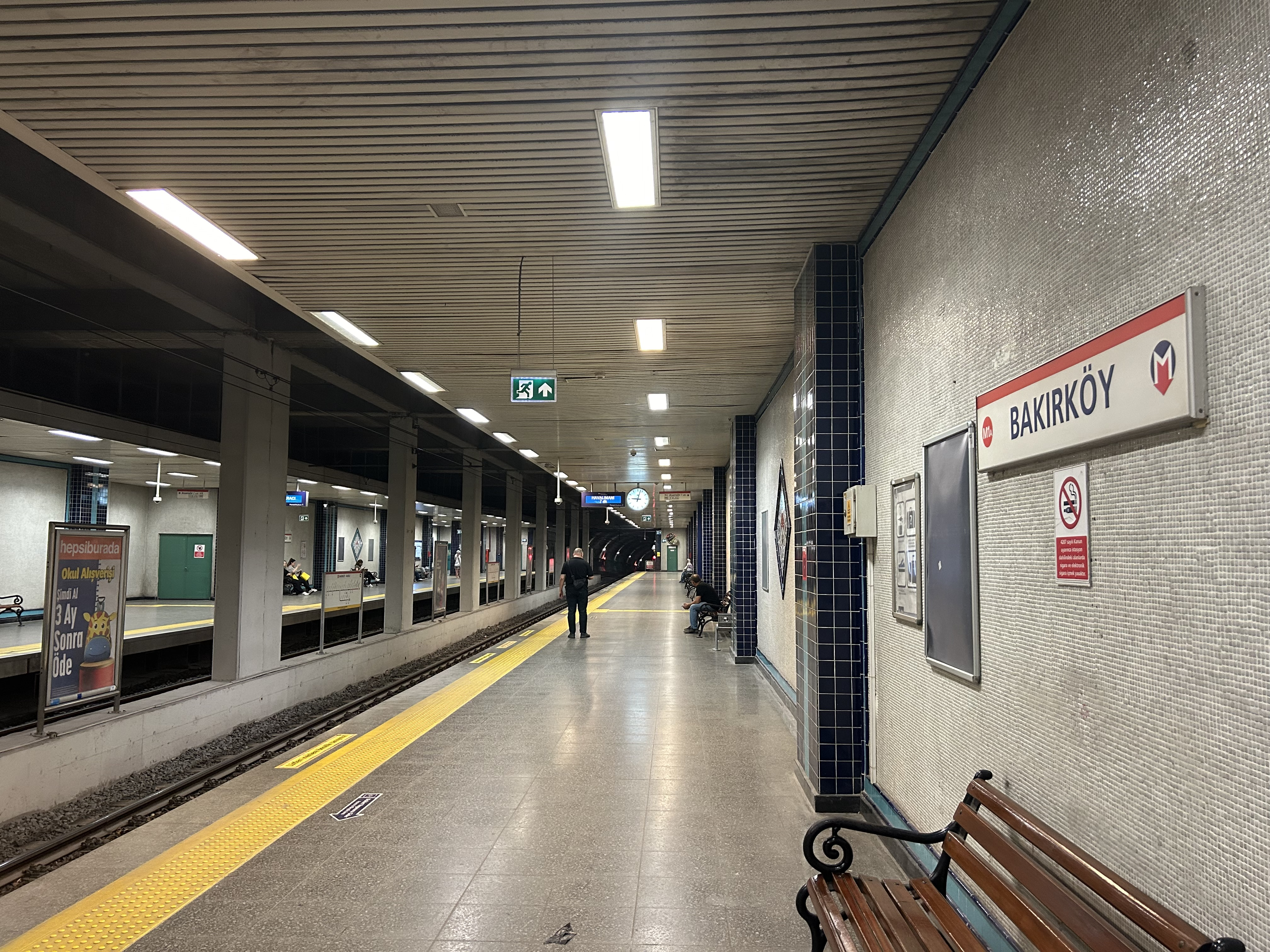
- M1A platform

General information
- Location: Osmaniye Neighborhood, Olgunlar Street, 34146; Bakırköy, Istanbul; Turkey
- Coordinates: 40°59′51″N 28°52′30″E
- System: Istanbul Metro rapid transit station
- Owner: Istanbul Metropolitan Municipality
- Lines: M1A; M3
- Platforms: 2 side platforms (M1A); 1 island platform (M3)
- Tracks: 4
- Connections: İETT Bus: 31, 31E, 50B, 71T, 72T, 73, 73F, 76D, 78ZB, 79G, 79Ş, 82, 89, 89A, 89B, 89K, 89M, 89S, 92, 97, 97A, 97BT, 97E, 97KZ, 97T, H-9, HT13, MK97; Istanbul Minibus: Bakırköy-Topkapı, Bakırköy Metro-Kocasinan, Bakırköy Metro-Basın Tesisleri, Bakırköy Metro-Barbaros Mahallesi, Bakırköy Metro-Yenibosna Metro, Bakırköy Metro-Yenimahalle, Bakırköy Metro-İstoç

Construction
- Structure type: Underground
- Parking: No
- Cycle facilities: Yes
- Accessible: Yes

History
- Opened: M1A: 7 March 1994 (32 years ago); M3: 10 March 2024 (2 years ago)
- Electrified: 750 V DC Overhead line (M1B); 1,500 V DC Overhead line (M3)

Services
Preceding station	Istanbul Metro	Following station
Bahçelievler towards Atatürk Havalimanı	M1a Line	Zeytinburnu towards Yenikapı
Haznedar towards Kayaşehir Merkez	M3 Line	Özgürlük Meydanı towards Bakırköy Sahil
Location

Bakırköy—İncirli is an underground rapid transit complex of the Istanbul Metro and served by lines M1A and M3. It is located in north-eastern Bakırköy district next to the E80 motorway.

M1 Bakırköy—İncirli was opened on 7 March 1994 as part of the extension from Zeytinburnu. The station is located just north of Bakırköy's center and is 1.8 km (1.1 mi) north of the Bakırköy railway station.

M3 İncirli was opened on 10 March 2024 as part of the extension from Kirazlı to Bakırköy Sahil.

== Layout ==
Side platform, doors will open on the right
Track 2	← toward Atatürk Havalimanı (Bahçelievler)
Track 1	toward Yenikapı (Zeytinburnu) →
Side platform, doors will open on the right

P Platform level	Northbound	← toward Kayaşehir Merkez (Haznedar)
P Platform level	Island platform, doors will open on the left
P Platform level	Southbound	toward Bakırköy Sahil (Özgürlük Meydanı) →

== Gallery ==
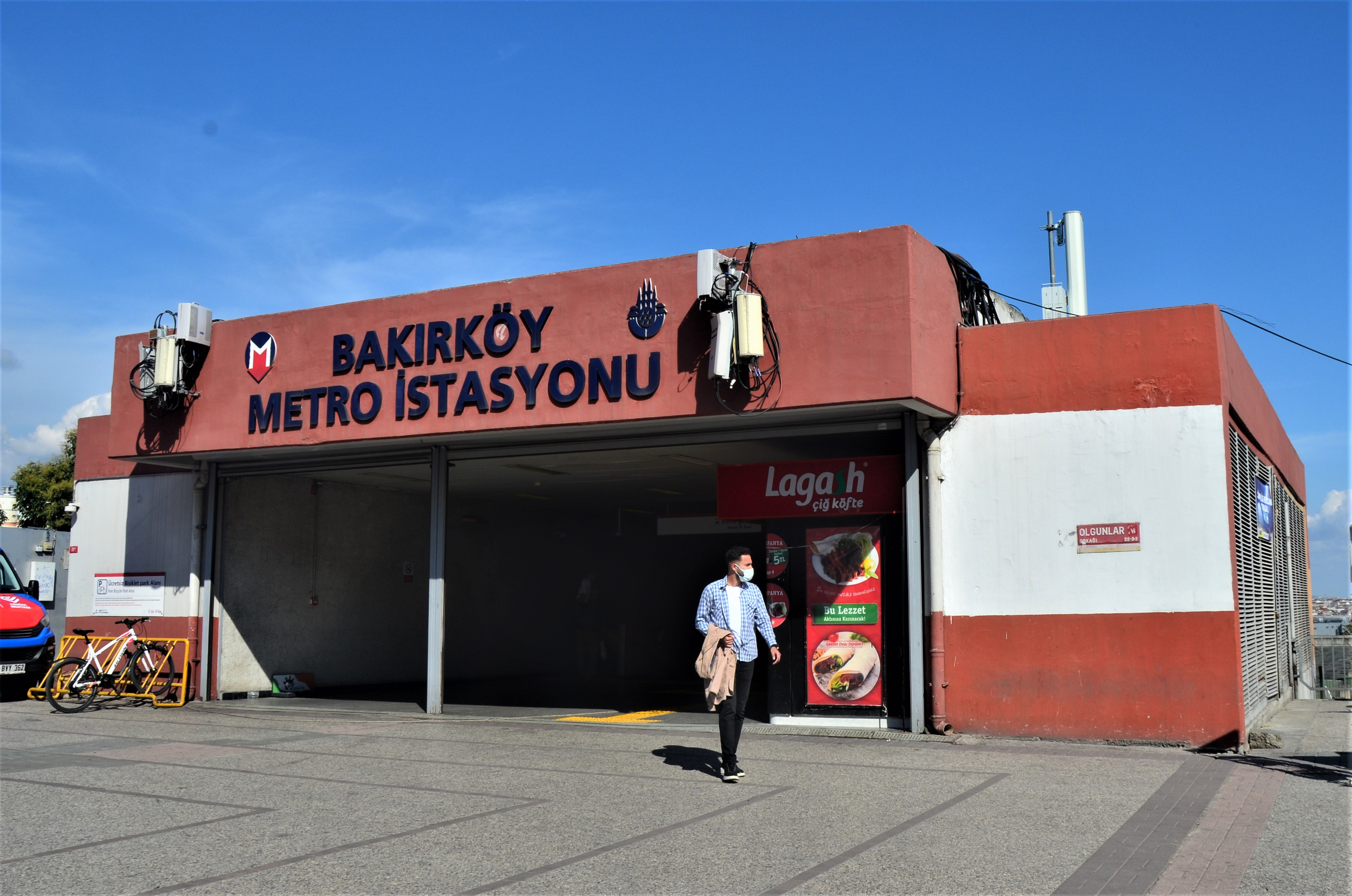
Entrance to M1A station

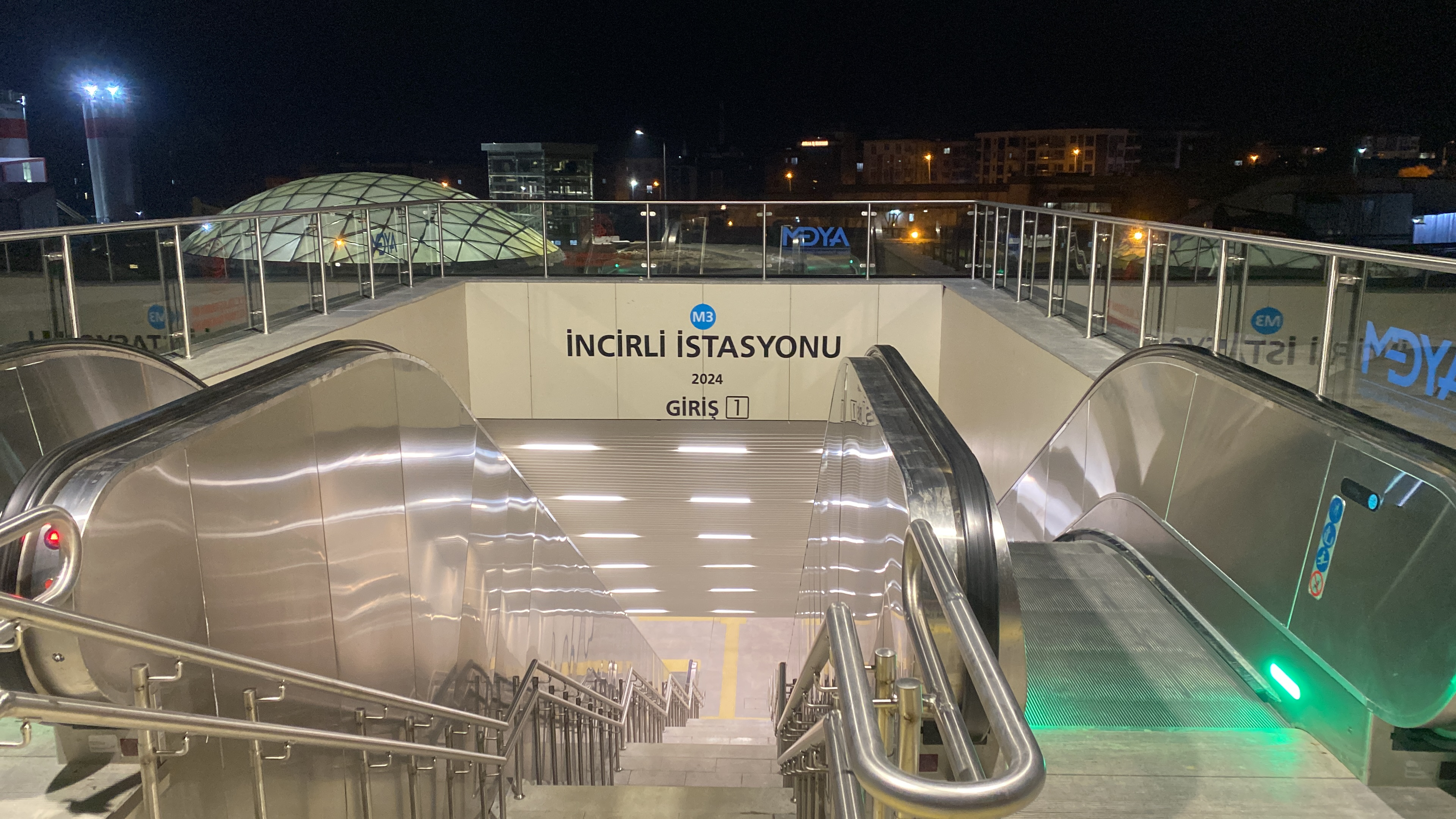
Entrance to M3 station

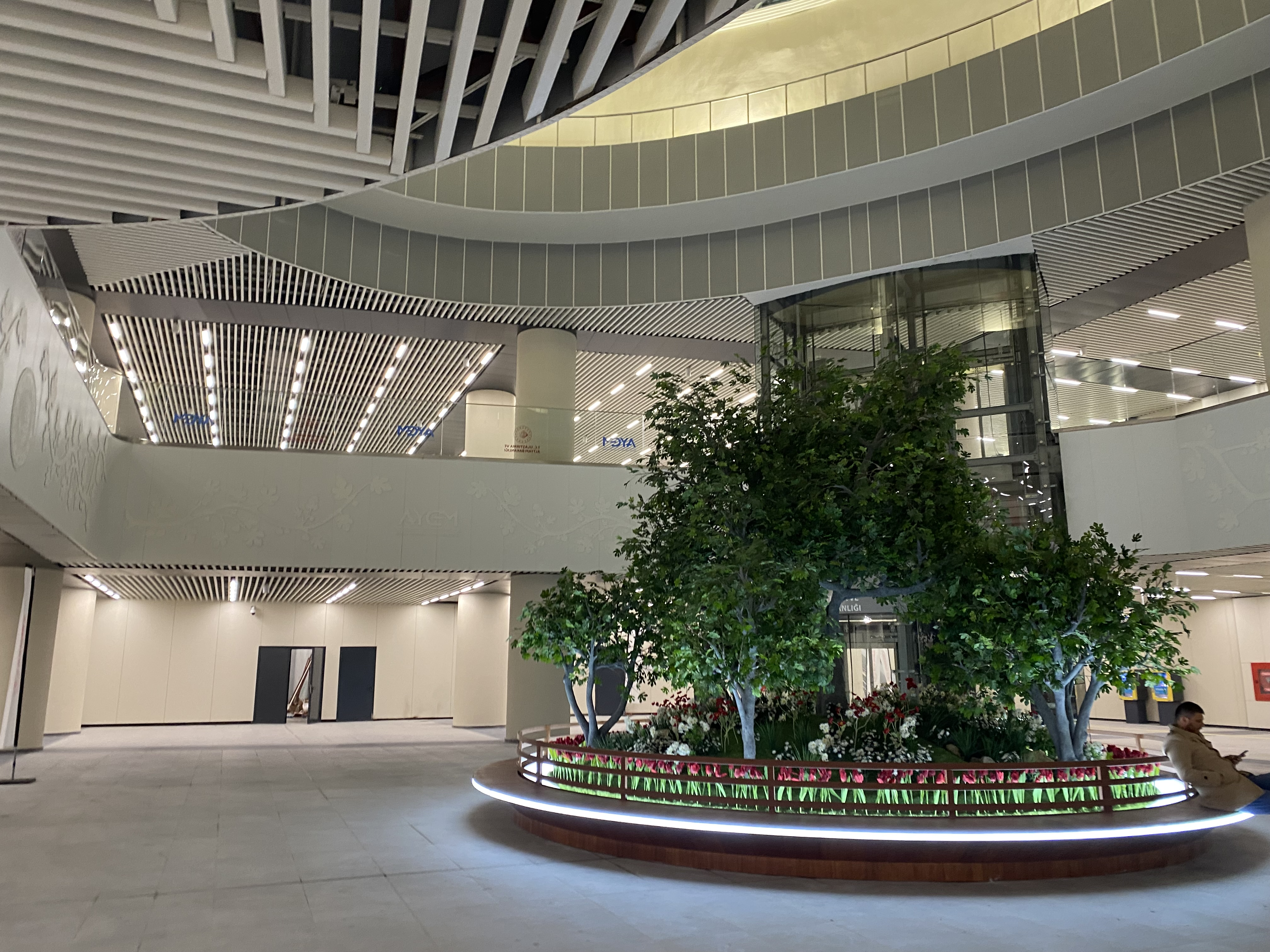
M3 concourse

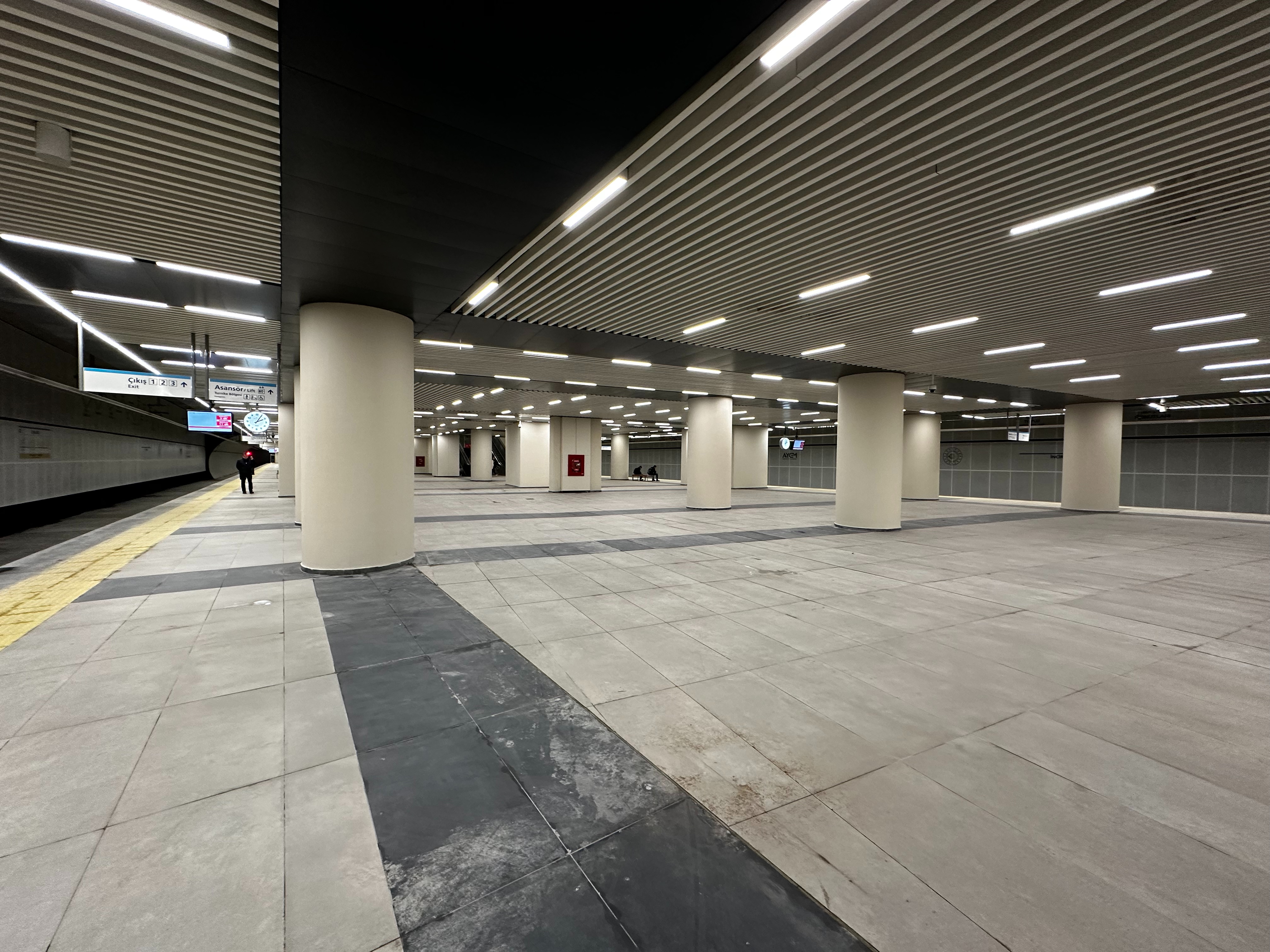
M3 platform

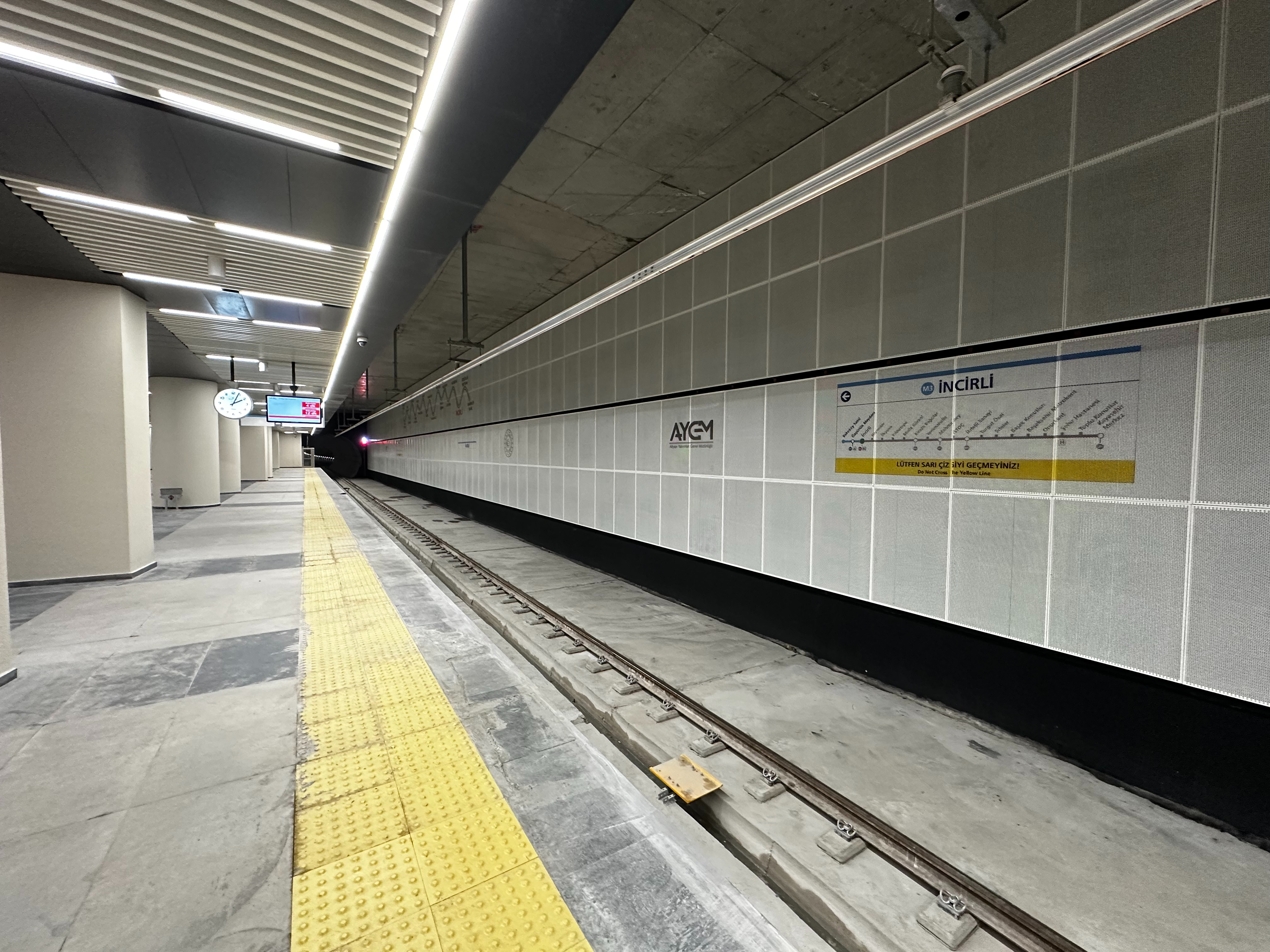
M3 platform facing the track
