= Bahçelievler metro station =

Station of the Istanbul Metro

Bahçelievler
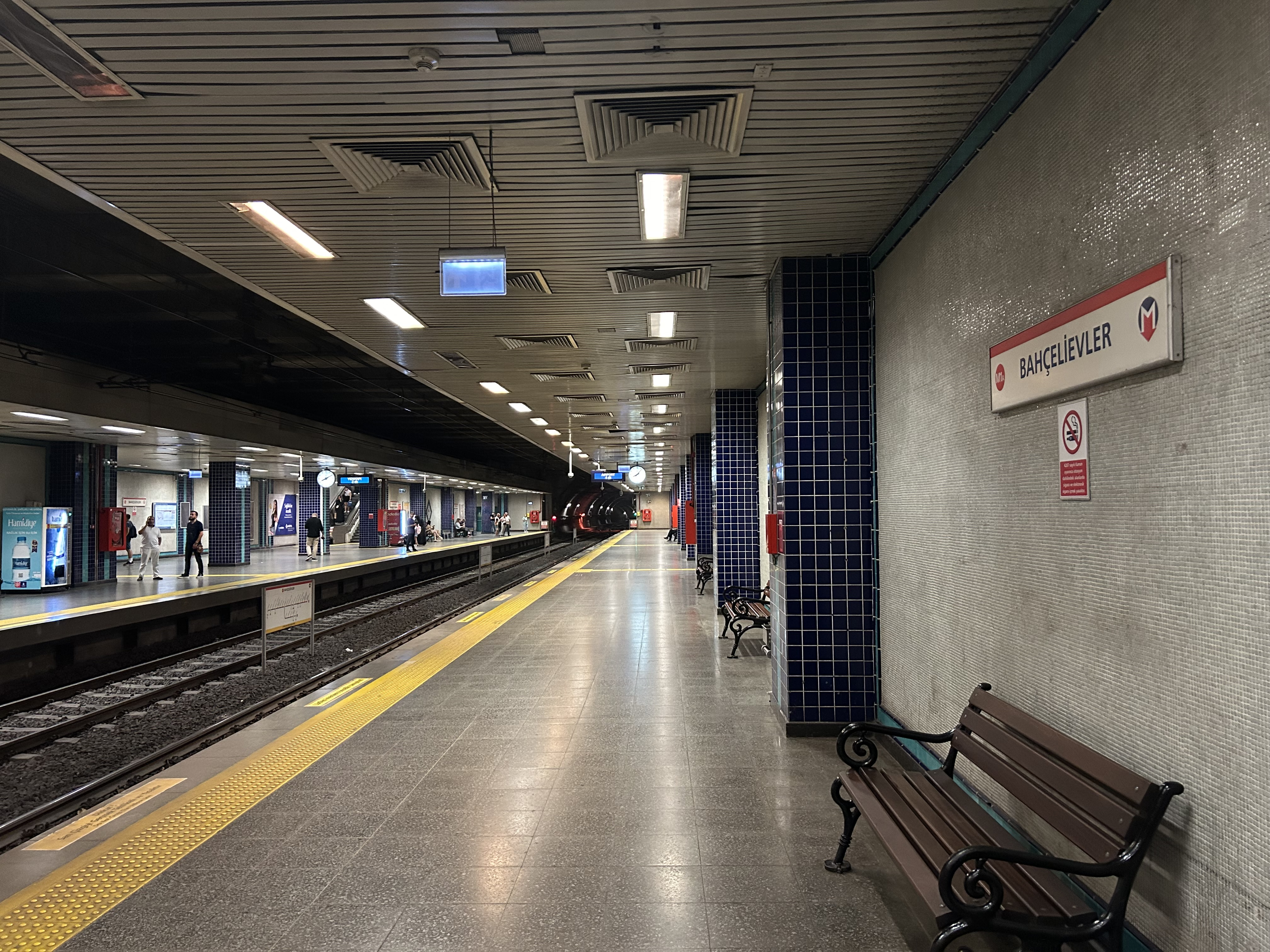
- Platform (towards Atatürk Airport)

General information
- Location: Bahçelievler Neighborhood, D.100 Kuzey Side Road, 34180; Bahçelievler, Istanbul; Turkey
- Coordinates: 40°59′44″N 28°51′49″E
- System: Istanbul Metro rapid transit station
- Owner: Istanbul Metropolitan Municipality
- Line: M1A
- Platforms: 2 side platforms
- Tracks: 2
- Connections: Metrobus: 34, 34C, 34G, 34AS, 34BZ at Bahçelievler İETT Bus: 31, 31E, 36CY, 73, 73B, 73F, 73H, 73Y, 76, 76B, 76C, 76D, 76V, 76Y, 78ZB, 79B, 79G, 79Ş, 82, 89, 89A, 89B, 89K, 89M, 89S, 89YB, 97, 97BT, 97E, 97KZ, 98, 98A, 98AB, 98B, 98H, 98M, 98MB, 98S, 98T, 98TB, 145, 146, E-57, H-9, HT13; Istanbul Minibus: Bahçelievler Metro-Bağcılar Devlet Hastanesi, Bahçelievler Metro-Oto Sanayi

Construction
- Structure type: Underground
- Accessible: Yes

History
- Opened: 15 January 1999; 27 years ago
- Electrified: 750 V DC Overhead line

Services
Preceding station	Istanbul Metro	Following station
Ataköy–Şirinevler towards Atatürk Havalimanı	M1a Line	Bakırköy–İncirli towards Yenikapı
Location

Bahçelievler is a rapid transit station on the M1 line of the Istanbul Metro located in southeastern Bahçelievler. Connection to the Istanbul Metrobus is available.

Bahçelievler was opened on 15 January 1999.

== Layout ==
Side platform, doors will open on the right
Track 2	← toward Atatürk Havalimanı (Ataköy–Şirinevler)
Track 1	toward Yenikapı (Bakırköy–İncirli) →
Side platform, doors will open on the right
