= Kocatepe station =

Station of the Istanbul Metro

Kocatepe
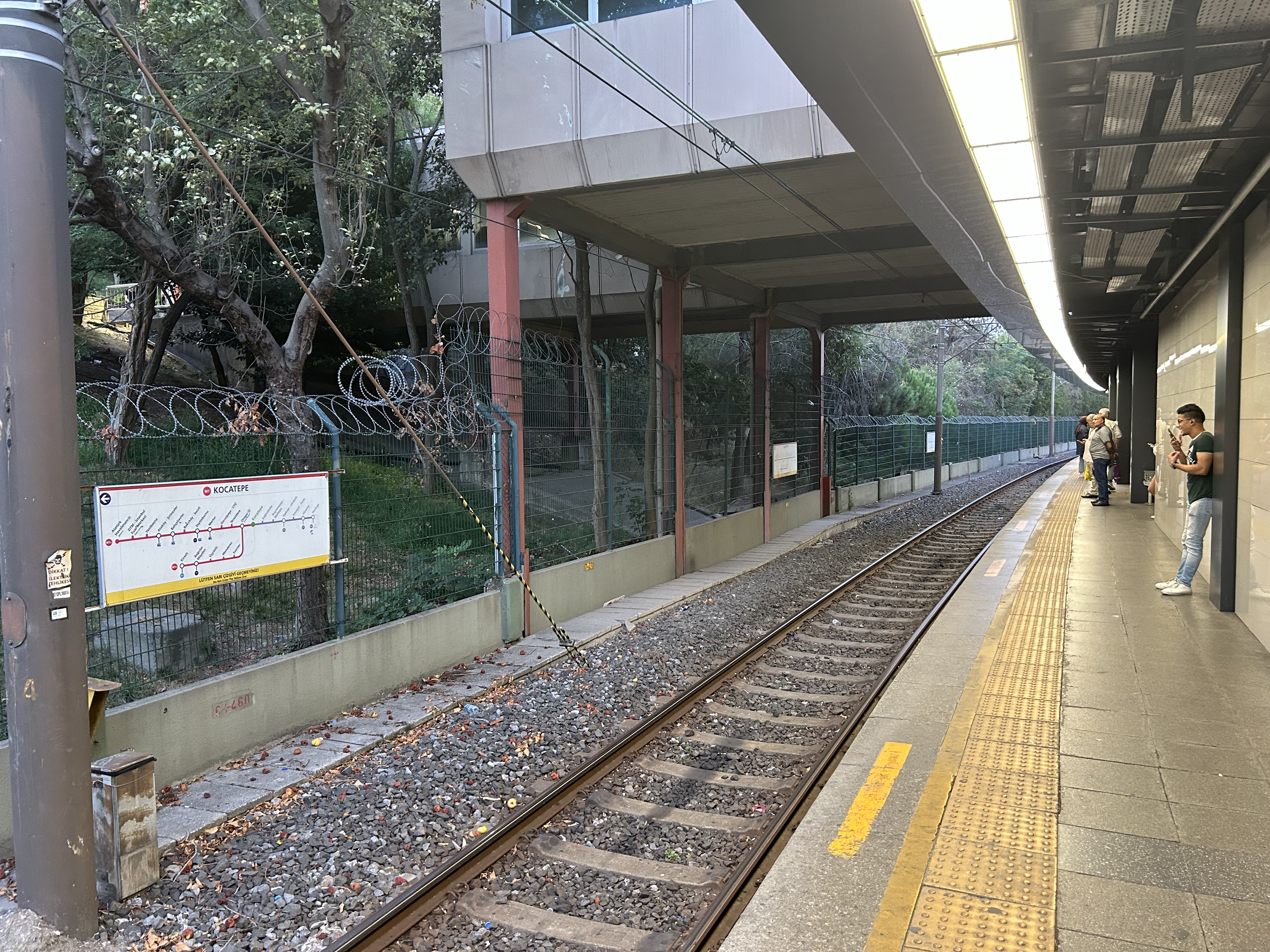
- The northern platform

General information
- Coordinates: 41.048502°N 28.895719°E
- System: Istanbul Metro rapid transit station
- Owner: Istanbul Metropolitan Municipality
- Lines: M1A; M1B
- Platforms: 1 island platform
- Tracks: 2
- Connections: İETT Bus: HT5, HT6; Istanbul Minibus: Topkapı-Nur Sitesi, Edirnekapı-Hal, Edirnekapı-Otogar, Edirnekapı-Cevatpaşa, Gazi Mahallesi-Topkapı, Cebeci Mahallesi-Topkapı

Construction
- Structure type: At-grade
- Accessible: Yes

History
- Opened: 3 September 1989; 36 years ago
- Electrified: 750 V DC Overhead line

Services
Preceding station	Istanbul Metro	Following station
Otogar towards Atatürk Havalimanı	M1a Line	Sağmalcılar towards Yenikapı
Otogar towards Kirazlı	M1b Line	Sağmalcılar towards Yenikapı
Location

Kocatepe is a rapid transit station on the M1 line of the Istanbul Metro. It is located in central Bayrampaşa in the southern part of the neighborhoods Kocatepe. The station is on the north side of the Forum Istanbul Shopping Mall and has direct access to the mall. Kocatepe was opened on 3 September 1989 as part of the first rapid transit line in Istanbul as well as Turkey and is one of the six original stations of the M1 line. The station briefly served as the western terminus of the M1 between September and December 1989 until the line was extended to Esenler.

== Layout ==
Track 2	← toward Atatürk Havalimanı ← toward Kirazlı
Island platform
Track 1	toward Yenikapı → toward Yenikapı →
