= Bayrampaşa–Maltepe station =

Station of the Istanbul Metro

Bayrampaşa-Maltepe
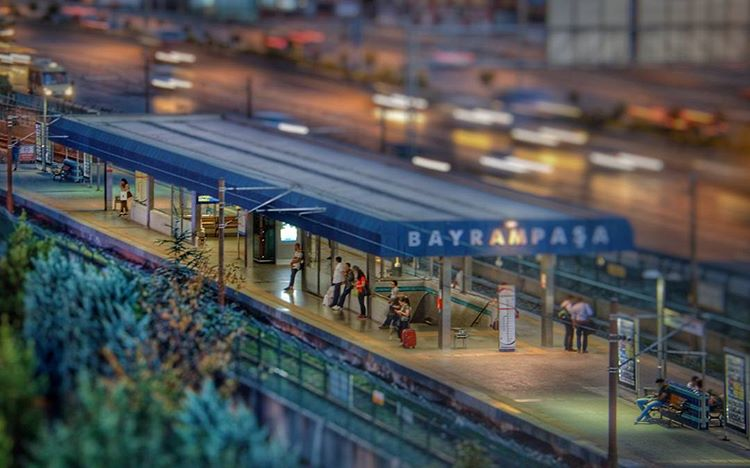
- Bayrampaşa metro station

General information
- Coordinates: 41.0341°N 28.9202°E
- System: Istanbul Metro rapid transit station
- Owner: Istanbul Metropolitan Municipality
- Lines: M1A; M1B
- Platforms: 1 island platform
- Tracks: 2
- Connections: İETT Bus: 32, 32A, 32T, 33M, 36, 36CB, 36ES, 50R, 55Y, 88; Istanbul Minibus: Eyüpsultan-Bayrampaşa, Eyüpsultan-Cevatpaşa

Construction
- Structure type: At-grade
- Accessible: Yes

History
- Opened: 3 September 1989; 36 years ago
- Electrified: 750 V DC Overhead line

Services
Preceding station	Istanbul Metro	Following station
Sağmalcılar towards Atatürk Havalimanı	M1a Line	Topkapı–Ulubatlı towards Yenikapı
Sağmalcılar towards Kirazlı	M1b Line	Topkapı–Ulubatlı towards Yenikapı
Location

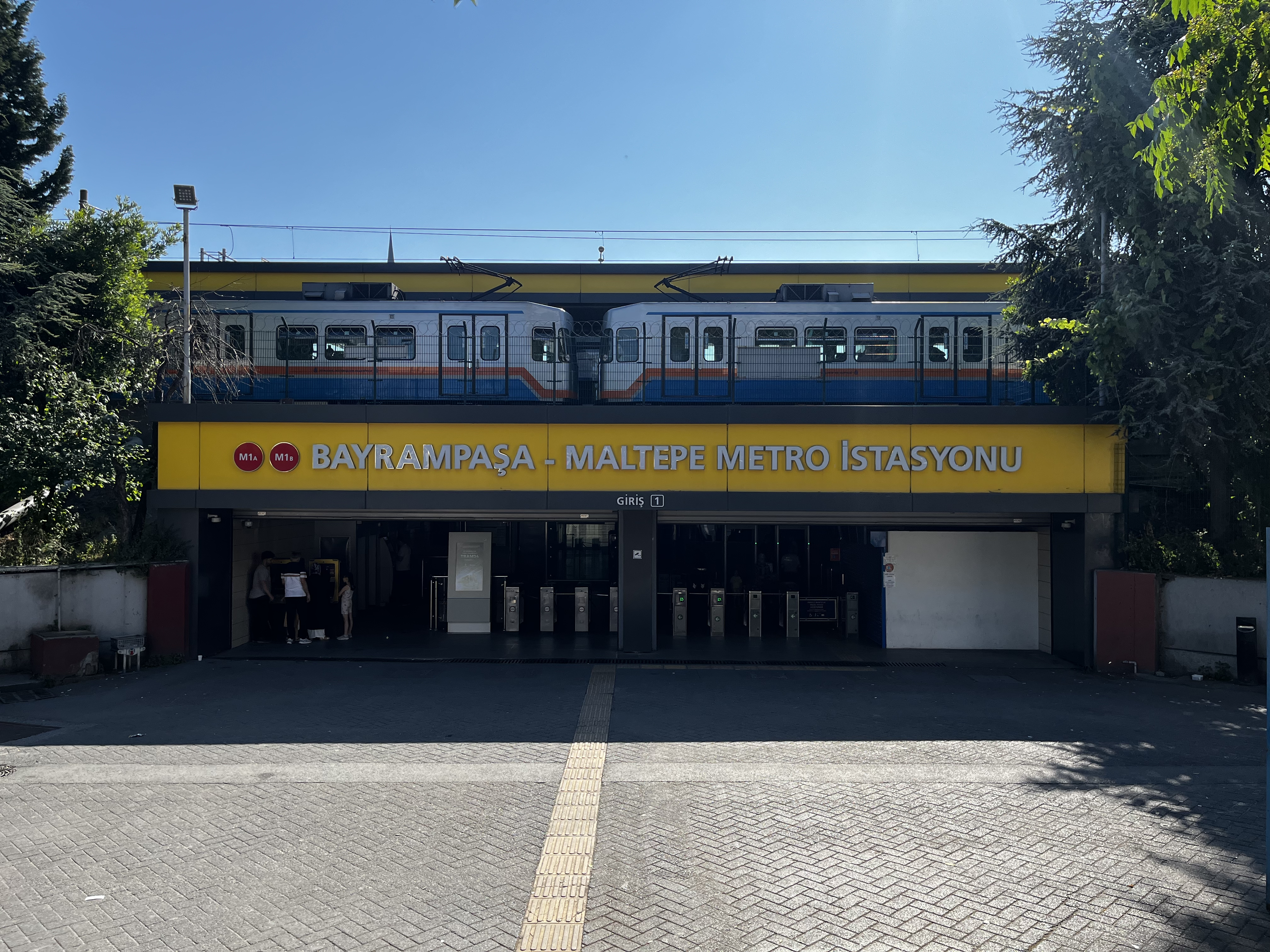
Entrance to the station

Bayrampaşa-Maltepe is a rapid transit station on the M1 line of the Istanbul Metro. It is located in southern Eyüp, adjacent to the O-3 highway. An out-of-system connection Demirkapı station on the T4 light rail line is available as well as İETT buses.

== History ==
Bayrampaşa-Maltepe was opened on 3 September 1989 as part of the first rapid transit line in Istanbul as well as Turkey and is one of the six original stations of the M1 line.

On 1st December 2015, a bomb blast occurred on an overpass near the station.

== Layout ==
Track 2	← toward Atatürk Havalimanı ← toward Kirazlı
Island platform
Track 1	toward Yenikapı → toward Yenikapı →
