= Sağmalcılar station =

Station of the Istanbul Metro

Sağmalcılar

General information
- Coordinates: 41.040908°N 28.907002°E
- System: Istanbul Metro rapid transit station
- Owner: Istanbul Metropolitan Municipality
- Lines: M1A; M1B
- Platforms: 1 island platform
- Tracks: 2
- Connections: İETT Bus: 32, 32A, 32M, 32T; Istanbul Minibus: Edirnekapı-Cevatpaşa, Edirnekapı-Hal, Topkapı-Nur Sitesi, Gazi Mahallesi-Topkapı, Cebeci Mahallesi-Topkapı

Construction
- Structure type: At-grade
- Accessible: Yes

History
- Opened: 3 September 1989; 36 years ago
- Electrified: 750 V DC Overhead line

Services
Preceding station	Istanbul Metro	Following station
Kocatepe towards Atatürk Havalimanı	M1a Line	Bayrampaşa–Maltepe towards Yenikapı
Kocatepe towards Kirazlı	M1b Line	Bayrampaşa–Maltepe towards Yenikapı
Location

Sağmalcılar is a rapid transit station on the M1 line of the Istanbul Metro. It is located in central Bayrampaşa, adjacent to the O-3 highway. Sağmalcılar was opened on 3 September 1989 as part of the first rapid transit line in Istanbul as well as Turkey and is one of the six original stations of the M1 line.

== Layout ==
Track 2	← toward Atatürk Havalimanı ← toward Kirazlı
Island platform
Track 1	toward Yenikapı → toward Yenikapı →
