= Ataköy–Şirinevler station =

Station of the Istanbul Metro

Ataköy—Şirinevler
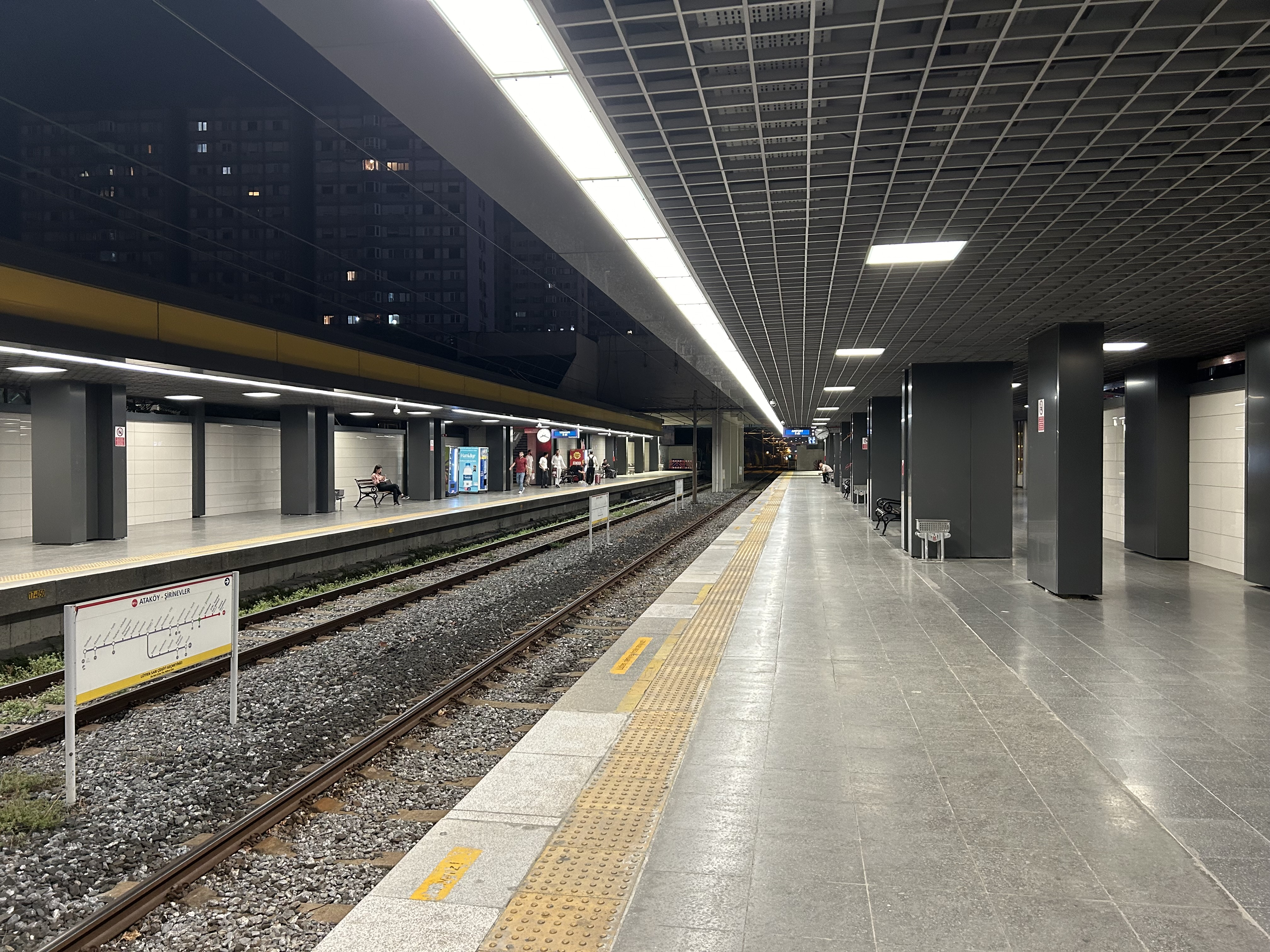
- Platform (towards Atatürk Airport)

General information
- Location: Ataköy 7-8-9-10. kısım, Bakırköy, D.100, 34192; Bakırköy, Istanbul; Turkey
- Coordinates: 40°59′28″N 28°50′45″E
- System: Istanbul Metro rapid transit station
- Owner: Istanbul Metropolitan Municipality
- Line: M1A
- Platforms: 2 side platforms
- Tracks: 2
- Connections: Metrobus: 34, 34C, 34G, 34AS, 34BZ at Şirinevler İETT Bus: 31, 31E, 36CY, 55Y, 73, 73B, 73F, 73H, 73Y, 76, 76B, 76C, 76D, 76V, 76Y, 78ZB, 79B, 79G, 79Ş, 82, 89, 89A, 89B, 89K, 89M, 89S, 89YB, 97, 97BT, 97E, 97KZ, 98, 98A, 98AB, 98B, 98H, 98M, 98MB, 98S, 98T, 98TB, 146, AVR1A, E-57, H-9, HT10, HT11, HT13, MR20; Istanbul Minibus: Bakırköy-Şirinevler, Şirinevler-Başakşehir 4.etap, Şirinevler-Kayaşehir, Fenertepe, Şirinevler-İkitelli Sanayi - Kayaşehir, Şirinevler-Tahtakale, Şirinevler-Yarımburgaz - Kayaşehir, Şirinevler - Giyimkent

Construction
- Structure type: At-grade
- Accessible: Yes

History
- Opened: 25 July 1995; 31 years ago
- Electrified: 750 V DC Overhead line

Services
| Preceding station | Istanbul Metro | Following station |
|---|---|---|
| Yenibosna towards Atatürk Havalimanı | M1a Line | Bahçelievler towards Yenikapı |
Location

Ataköy—Şirinevler is a station on the M1 line of the Istanbul Metro in Bakırköy, Istanbul. Connection to the Istanbul Metrobus is available. It was opened on 25 July 1995.

== Layout ==
| Side platform, doors will open on the right |
| Track 2 | ← toward Atatürk Havalimanı (Yenibosna) |
| Track 1 | toward Yenikapı (Bahçelievler) → |
Side platform, doors will open on the right
