= Topkapı–Ulubatlı station =

Station of the Istanbul Metro

Topkapı–Ulubatlı
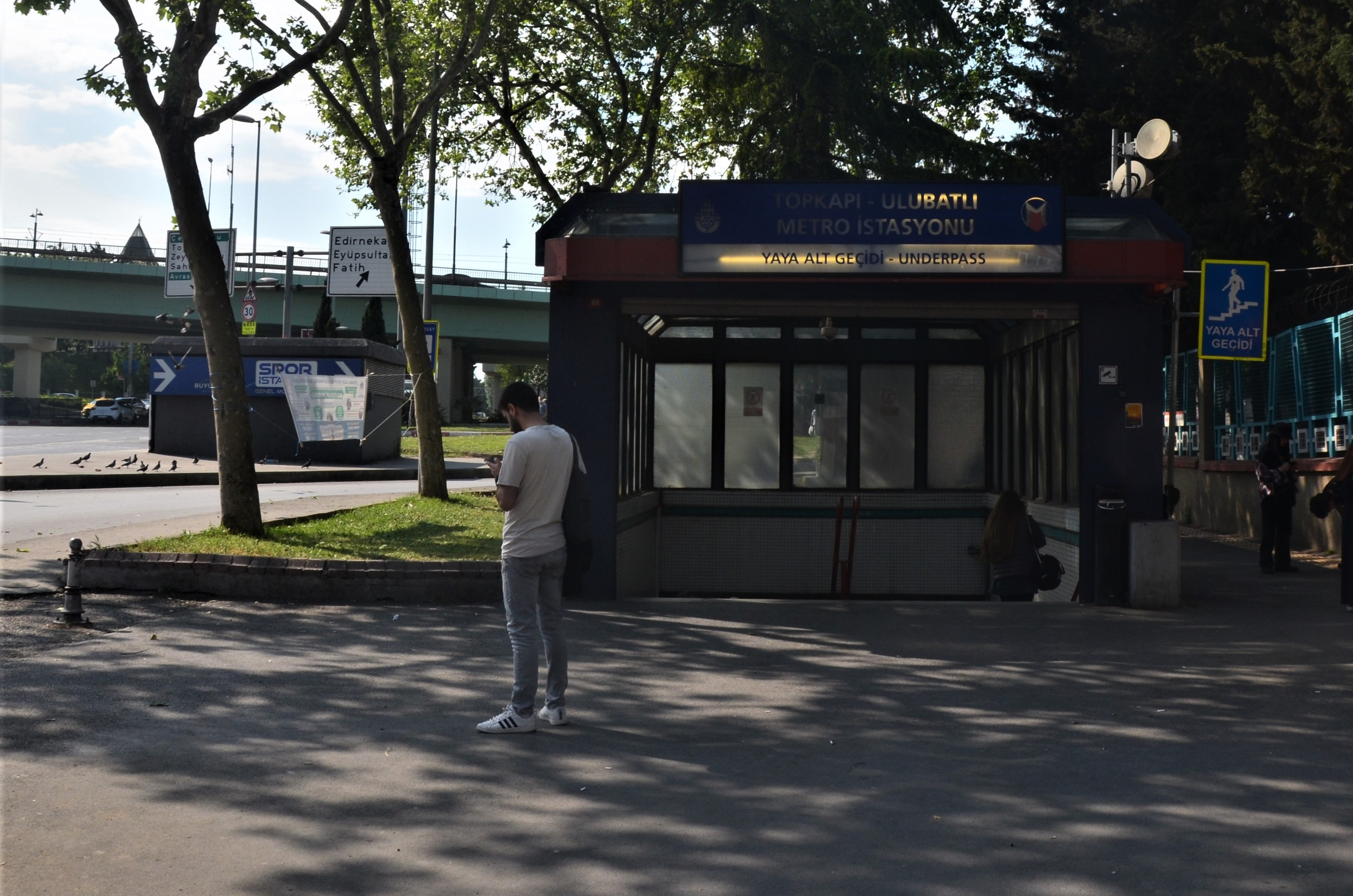
- Entrance to Topkapı–Ulubatlı metro station

General information
- Coordinates: 41.023592°N 28.930655°E
- System: Istanbul Metro rapid transit station
- Owner: Istanbul Metropolitan Municipality
- Lines: M1A; M1B
- Platforms: 2 side platforms
- Tracks: 2
- Connections: Istanbul Tram: T4 at Vatan; İETT Bus: 31Y, 32T, 33TE, 38, 38Z, 50Y, 76E, 78, 78H, 79T, 88A, 89T, 91E, 92A, 97G, 146B, 146T, 336, YH-1; Istanbul Minibus: Aksaray-Güzeltepe, Aksaray-İmar Blokları, Aksaray-Karayolları, Aksaray-Vialand, Aksaray-Yıldıztabya, Pazariçi-Aksaray

Construction
- Structure type: Underground
- Accessible: Yes

History
- Opened: 3 September 1989; 36 years ago
- Electrified: 750 V DC Overhead line

Services
Preceding station	Istanbul Metro	Following station
Bayrampaşa–Maltepe towards Atatürk Havalimanı	M1a Line	Emniyet–Fatih towards Yenikapı
Bayrampaşa–Maltepe towards Kirazlı	M1b Line	Emniyet–Fatih towards Yenikapı
Location

Topkapı–Ulubatlı is an underground station on the M1 line of the Istanbul Metro. It is located in eastern Fatih between the neighborhoods of Karagümrük and Topkapı in Istanbul. An out-of-system transfer to Vatan station on the T4 light-rail line is available as well as connections to İETT city buses. Topkapı–Ulubatlı was opened on 3 September 1989 as part of the first rapid transit line in Istanbul as well as Turkey and is one of the six original stations of the M1 line. The station is right next to the Byzantine-era Theodosian walls of Constantinople. The station gets part of its name from the 15th century soldier, Ulubatlı Hasan who was one of the first Ottoman soldiers to scale the walls during the Fall of Constantinople.

== Layout ==
Side platform, doors will open on the right
Track 2	← toward Atatürk Havalimanı ← toward Kirazlı
Track 1	toward Yenikapı → toward Yenikapı →
Side platform, doors will open on the right
