= DTM–İstanbul Fuar Merkezi station =

Station of the Istanbul Metro

DTM-İstanbul Fuar Merkezi
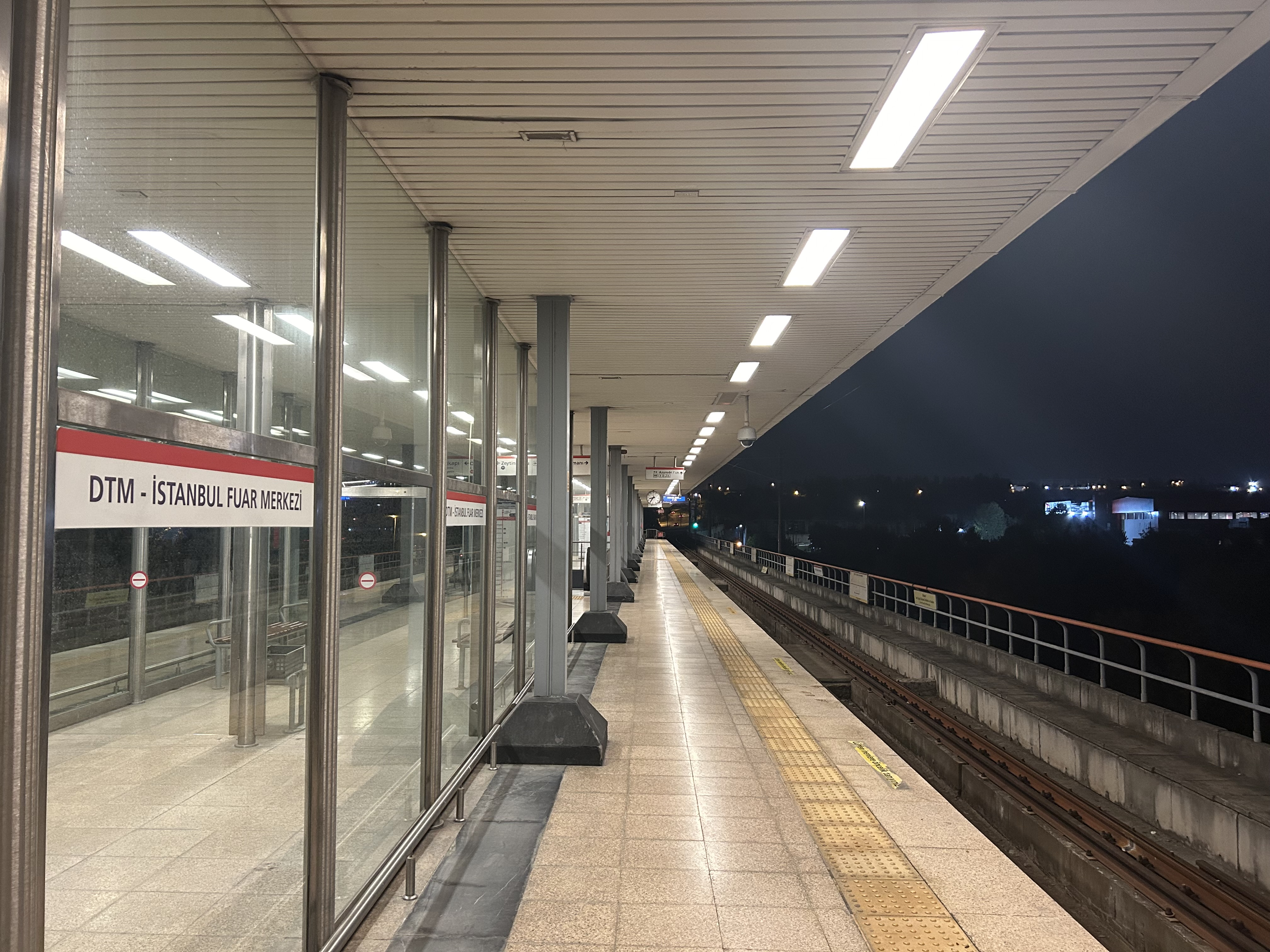
- Platform

General information
- Location: Yeşilköy Neighborhood, Atatürk Street, 34149; Bakırköy, Istanbul; Turkey
- Coordinates: 40°59′11″N 28°49′42″E
- System: Istanbul Metro rapid transit station
- Owner: Istanbul Metropolitan Municipality
- Line: M1A
- Platforms: 1 island platform
- Tracks: 2

Construction
- Structure type: Elevated
- Accessible: Yes

History
- Opened: 20 December 2002; 23 years ago
- Electrified: 750 V DC Overhead line

Services
Preceding station	Istanbul Metro	Following station
Atatürk Havalimanı Terminus	M1a Line	Yenibosna towards Yenikapı
Location

DTM-İstanbul Fuar Merkezi is a station on the M1 line of the Istanbul Metro in Bakırköy, Istanbul. The station consists of an elevated island platform servicing two tracks within the Istanbul World Trade Center (Turkish: Dünya Ticaret Merkezi, DTM).

The station was opened on 20 December 2002 as part of the westward extension of the M1 to Atatürk Airport.

== Layout ==
Track 2	← toward Atatürk Havalimanı (terminus)
Island platform, doors will open on the left
Track 1	toward Yenikapı (Yenibosna) →

== Gallery ==
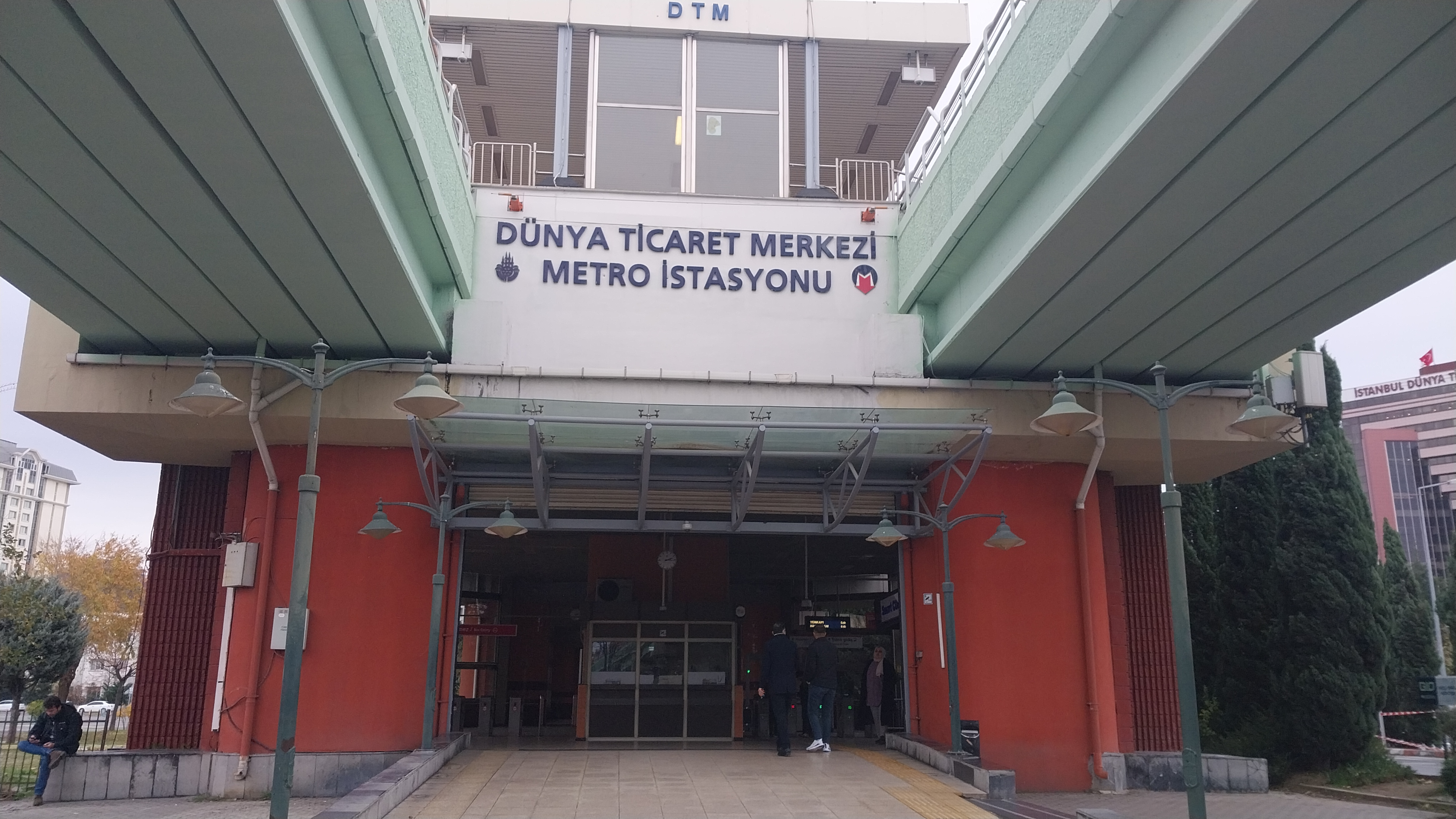
Entrance

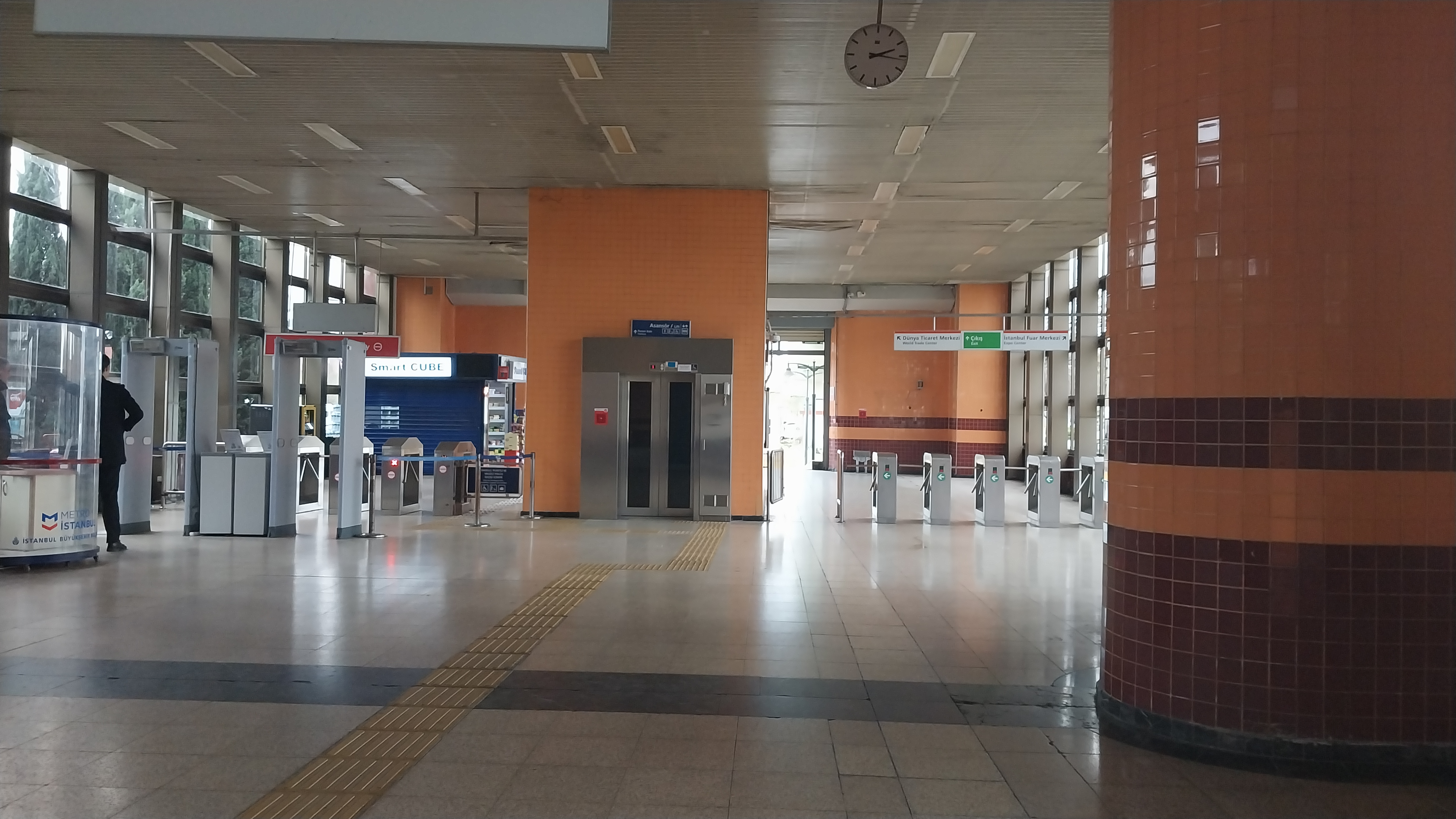
Ticket hall

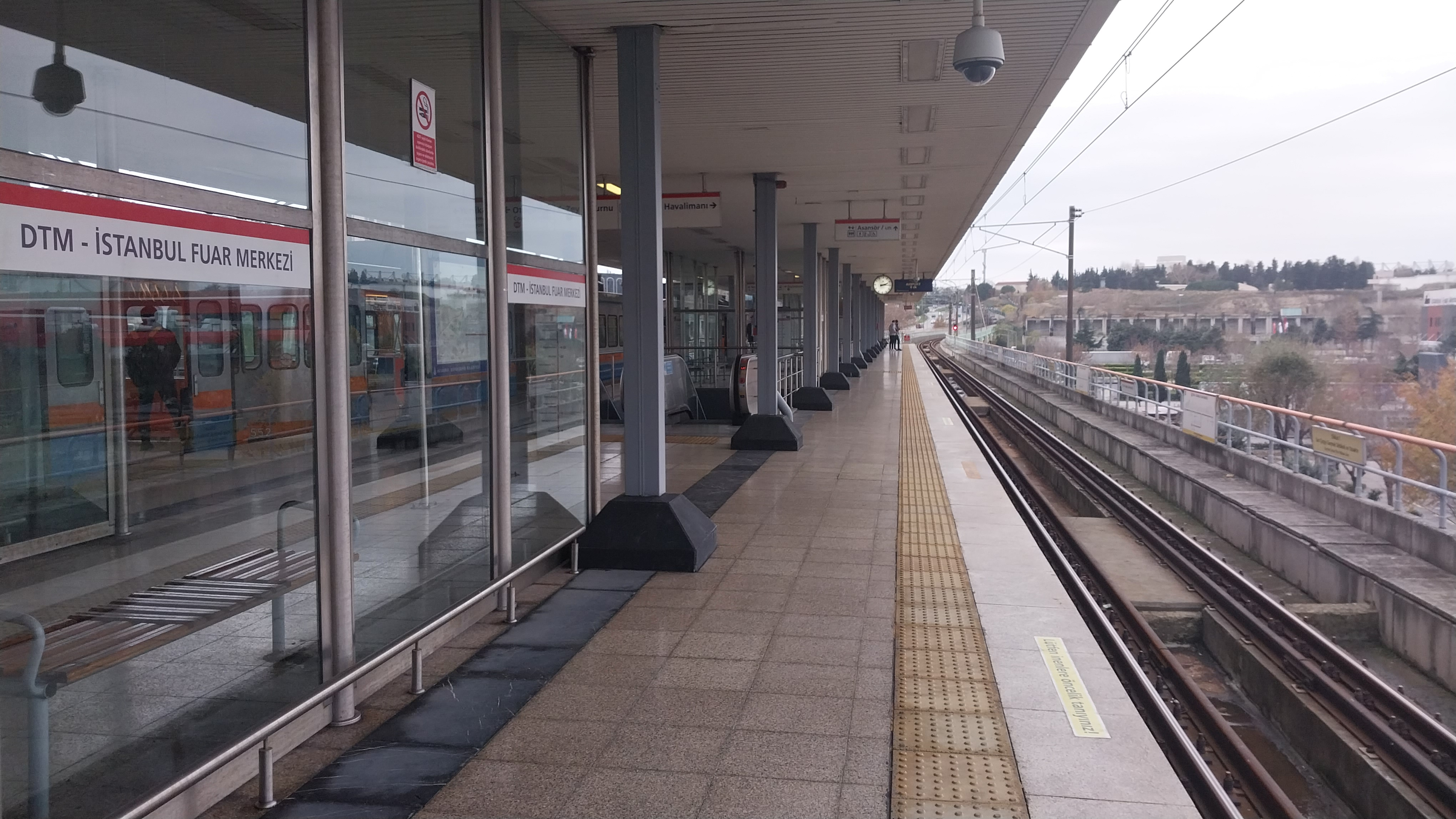
Platform

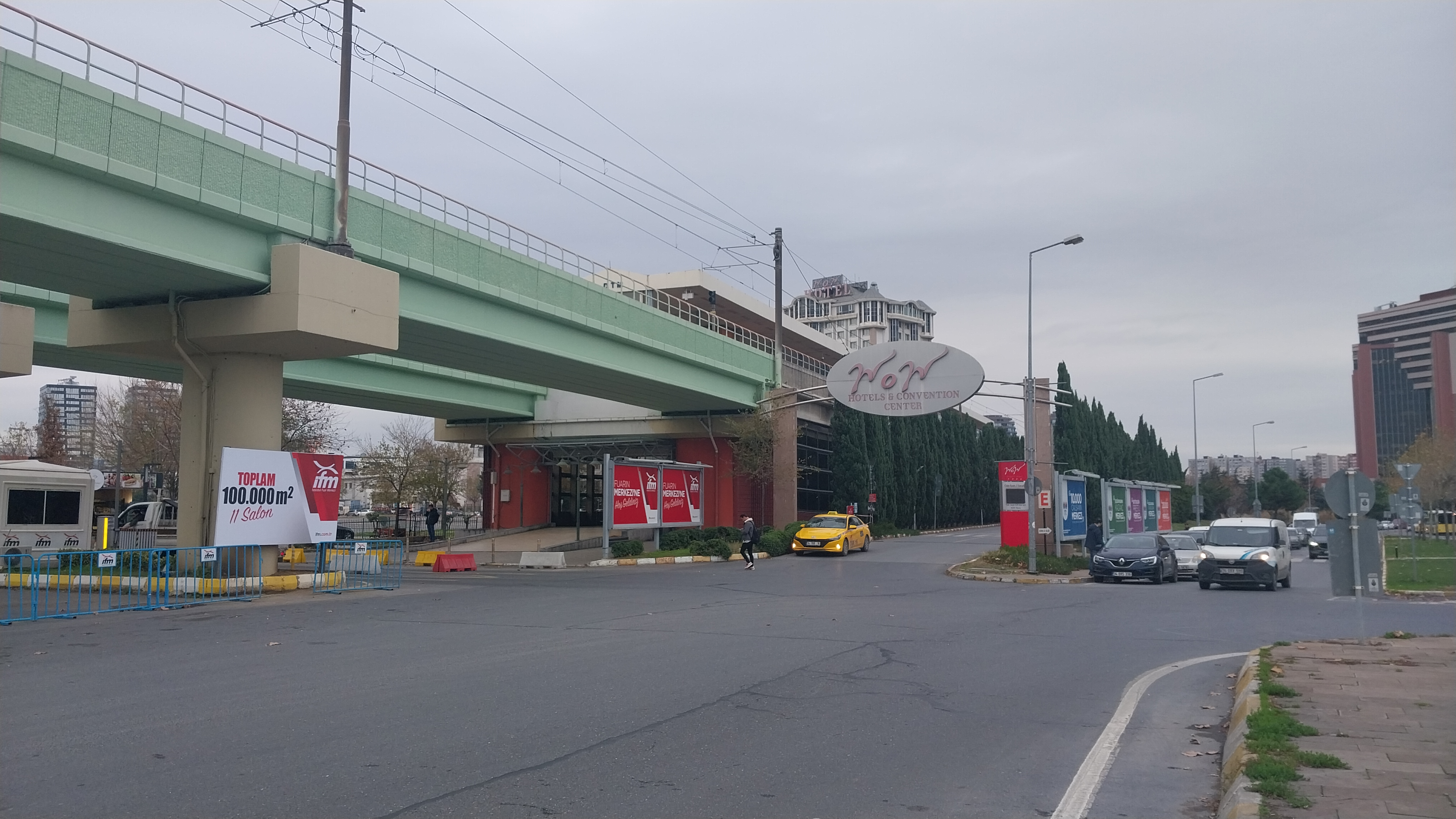
Viaduct

== Nearby ==
WOW Airport Hotel, WOW International Hotel
