= Istanbul Metro bombing =

Pipe bombing at Istanbul Metro

- Date: 1 December 2015
- Location: Istanbul, Turkey
- Injuries: 5

On 1 December 2015, a bombing occurred on the Istanbul Metro, Turkey. An explosion caused by a pipe bomb occurred at around 17:15 near Bayrampaşa—Maltepe station in Bayrampaşa, Istanbul, injuring five people.
