= Yenibosna station =

Station of the Istanbul Metro

Yenibosna (M1) Yenibosna (M9)
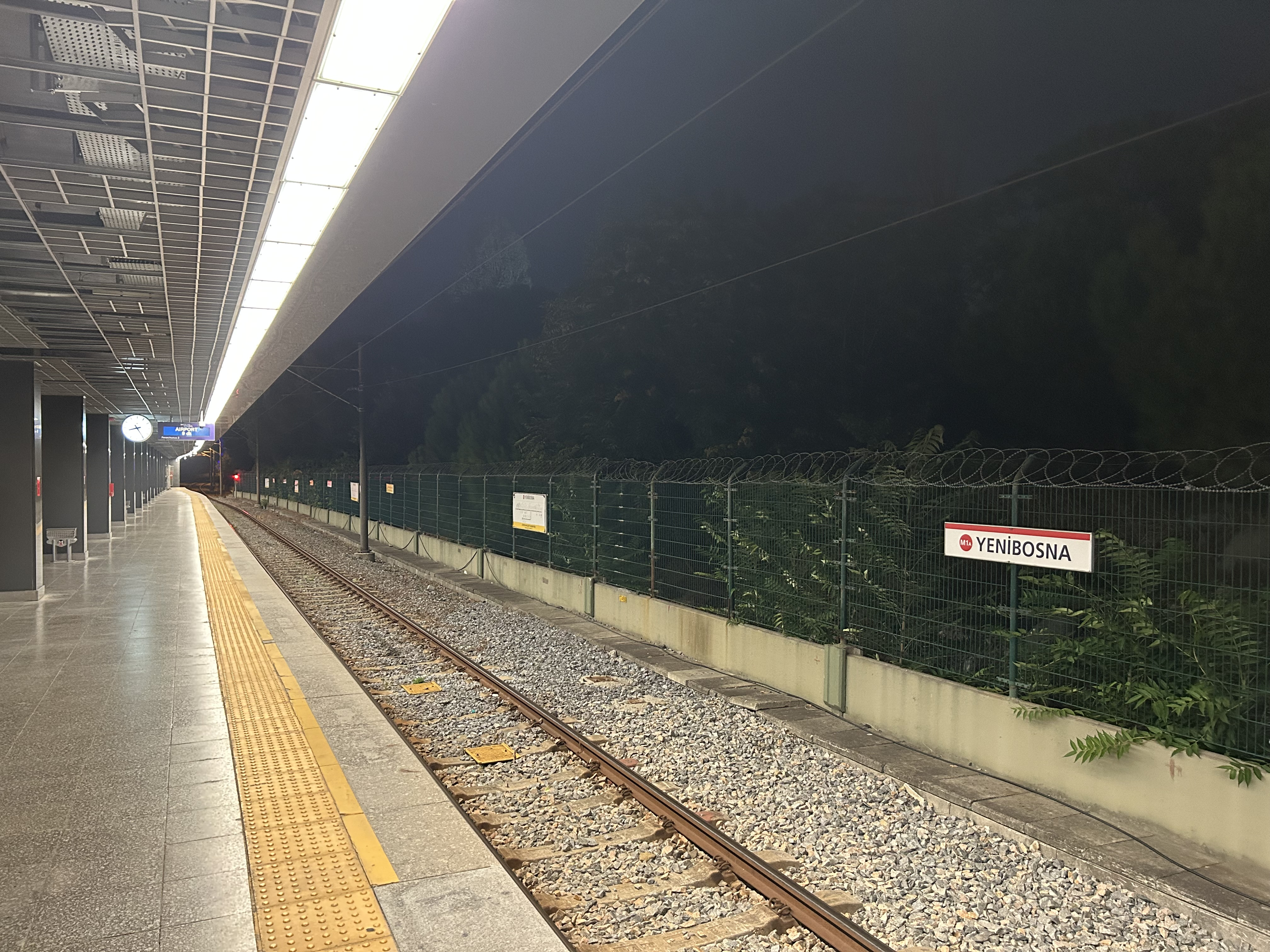
- M1A platform

General information
- Location: Ataköy 7-8-9-10. Kısım Neighborhood, Metro Station Platforms, 34180; Bakırköy, Istanbul; Turkey
- Coordinates: 40°59′23″N 28°50′15″E
- System: Istanbul Metro rapid transit station
- Owner: Istanbul Metropolitan Municipality
- Lines: M1A; M9
- Platforms: 2 side platforms (M1A); 1 island platform (M9)
- Tracks: 4
- Connections: İETT Bus: 31, 31E, 31K, 97KZ, 36AY, 36CY, 98B, 55Y, 73B, 73F, 73H, 73Y, 76, 76B, 76C, 76D, 76V, 76Y, 78B, 79B, 79F, 79FY, 79G, 79K, 79Ş, 79Y, 82, 82S, 89, 89A, 89B, 89K, 89M, 89S, 89YB, 97KZ, 98, 98AB, 98B, 98H, 98MB, 98S, 98T, 98TB, 146, AVR1A, E-57, H-9, HS1, HT10, HT11, HT12, HT20, KÇ2, MR20; Istanbul Minibus: Bakırköy-Yenibosna Metro, Bakırköy metro-Yenibosna Metro; Istanbul Dolmus: Taksim-Yenibosna

Construction
- Structure type: Embanked (M1); Underground (M9)
- Parking: Yes
- Cycle facilities: Yes
- Accessible: Yes

History
- Opened: M1A: 26 July 1995 (31 years ago); M9: 18 March 2024 (2 years ago)
- Rebuilt: M1A: 15 December 2022 (3 years ago)
- Electrified: 750 V DC Overhead line

Services
Preceding station	Istanbul Metro	Following station
DTM–İstanbul Fuar Merkezi towards Atatürk Havalimanı	M1a Line	Ataköy–Şirinevler towards Yenikapı
Çobançeşme towards Olimpiyat	M9 Line	Ataköy Terminus
Location

Yenibosna is an interchange station on the M1 and M9 lines of the Istanbul Metro in Bakırköy, Istanbul. The M1 station was opened on 25 July 1995 and was the western terminus of the M1 until 2002, when the line was extended towards Atatürk Airport. The M9 station was opened on 18 March 2024.

== Station Layout ==
P Platform level	Westbound	← toward Atatürk Havalimanı (DTM–İstanbul Fuar Merkezi)
P Platform level	Island platform, doors will open on the left
P Platform level	Eastbound	toward Yenikapı (Ataköy–Şirinevler) →

P Platform level	Northbound	← toward Olimpiyat (Çobançeşme)
P Platform level	Island platform, doors will open on the left
P Platform level	Southbound	toward Ataköy (terminus) →

== Operation information ==
=== M9 ===
The M9 line operates between 06:00 and 00:00 and train frequency is 9 minutes. The line has no night service.

== Gallery ==
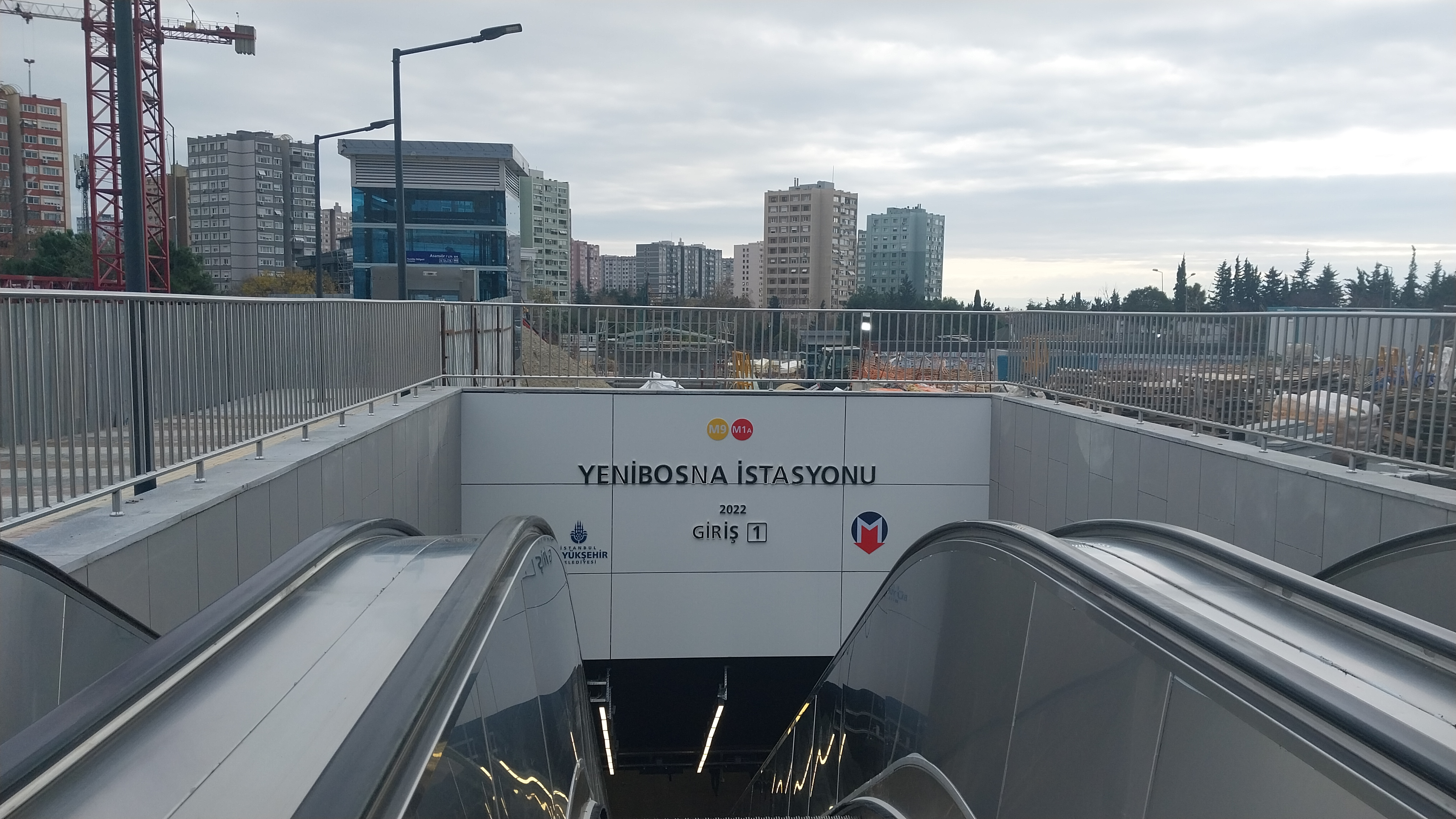
Entrance 1

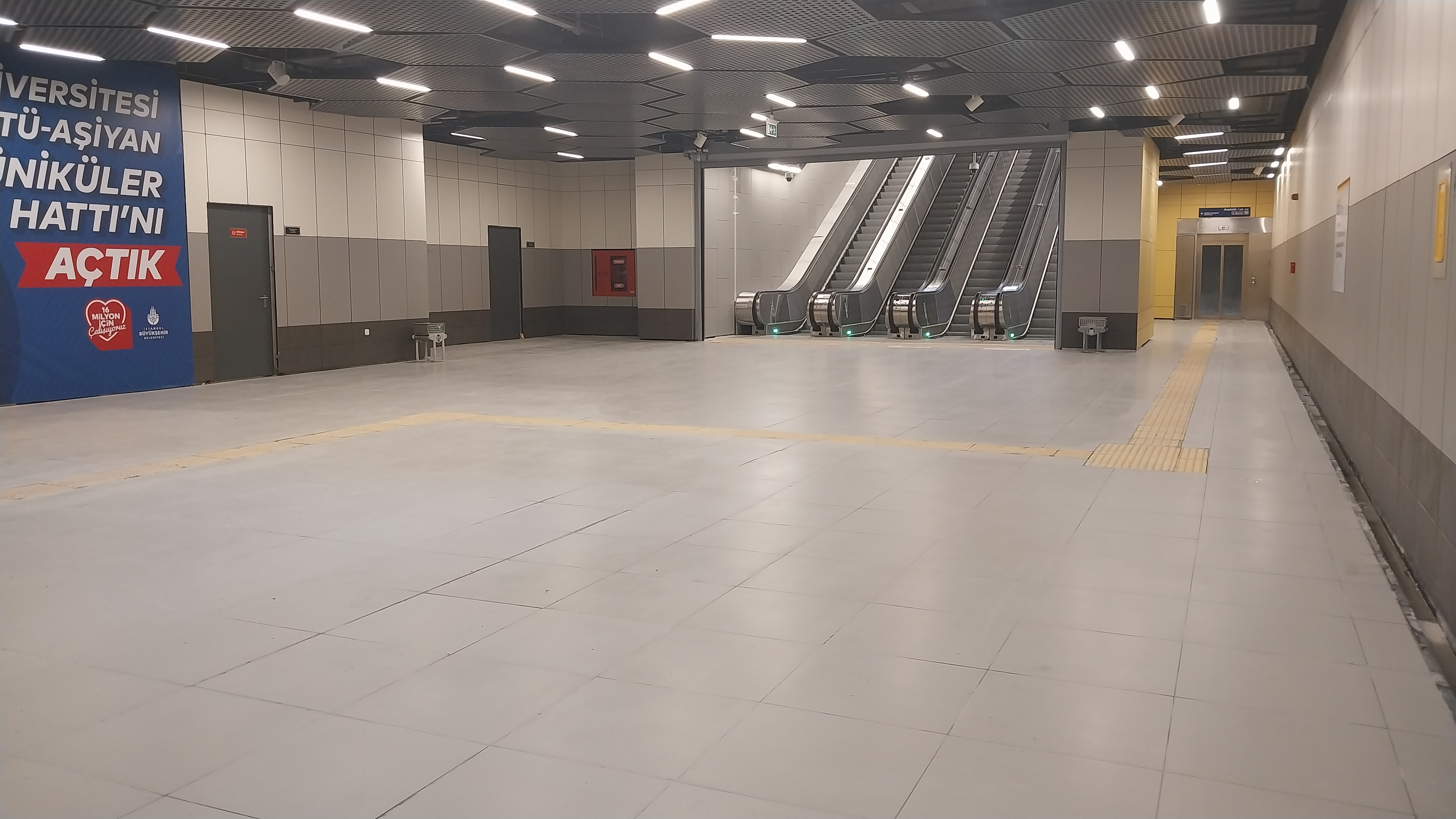
Interchange hall

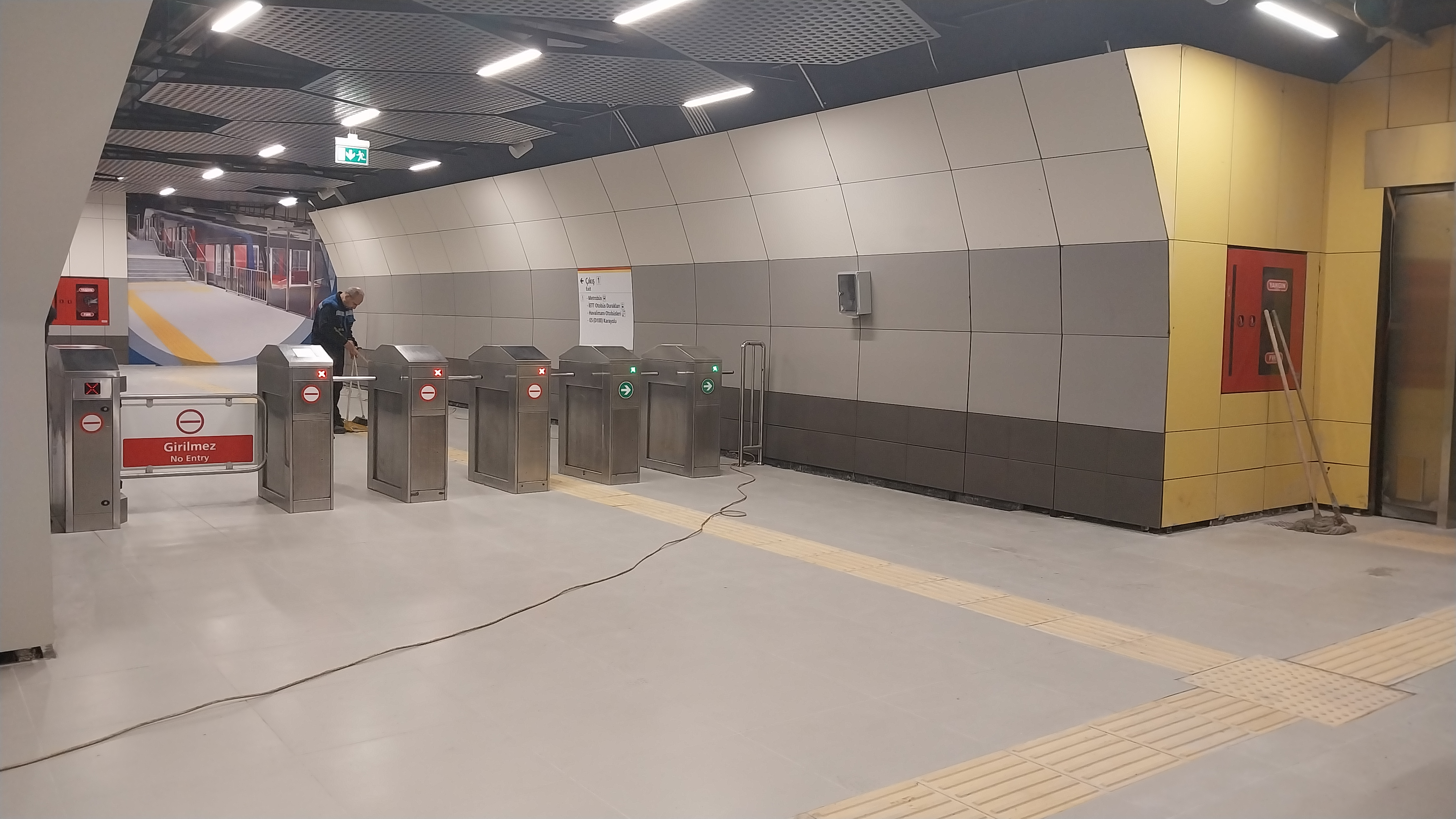
Ticket hall

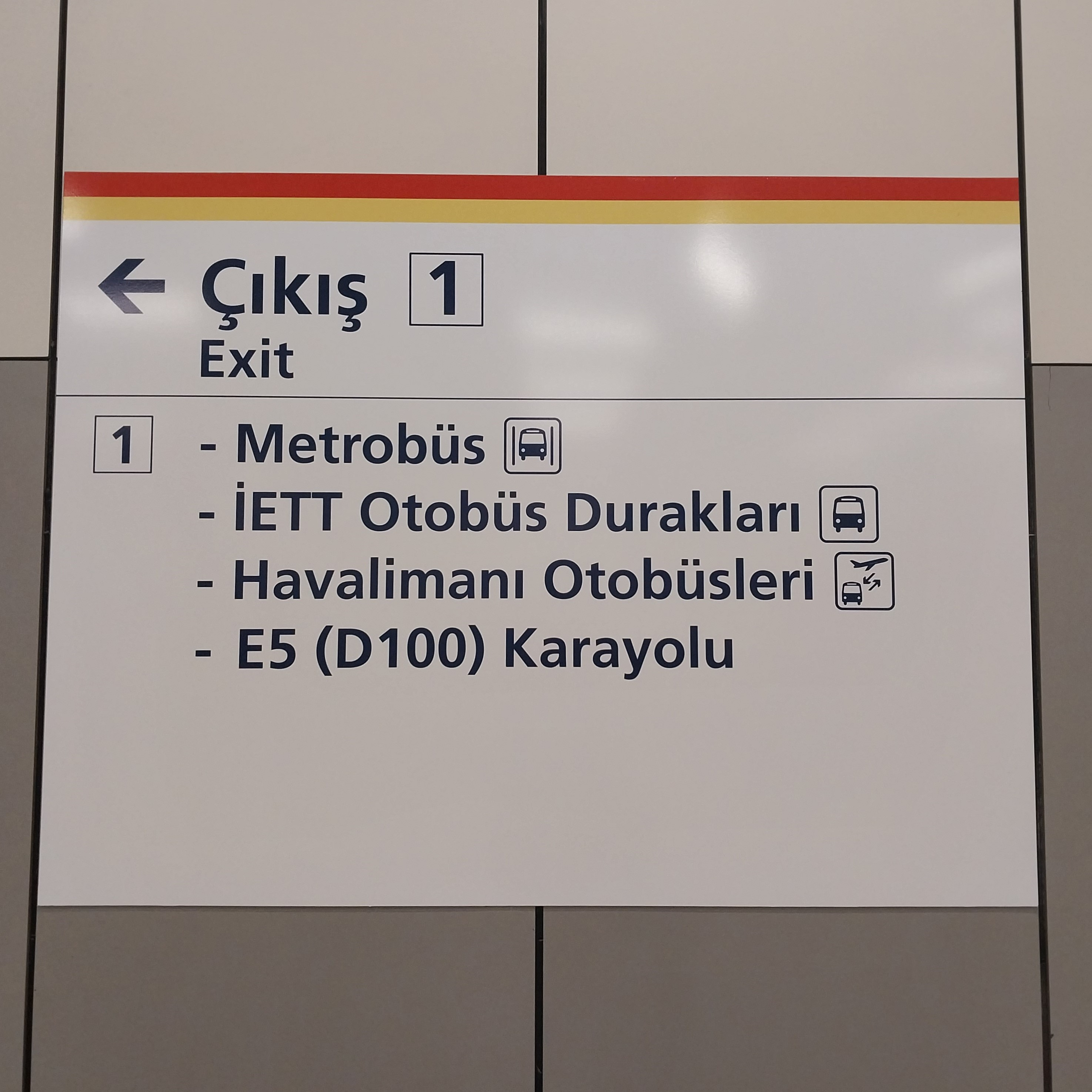
Exit sign

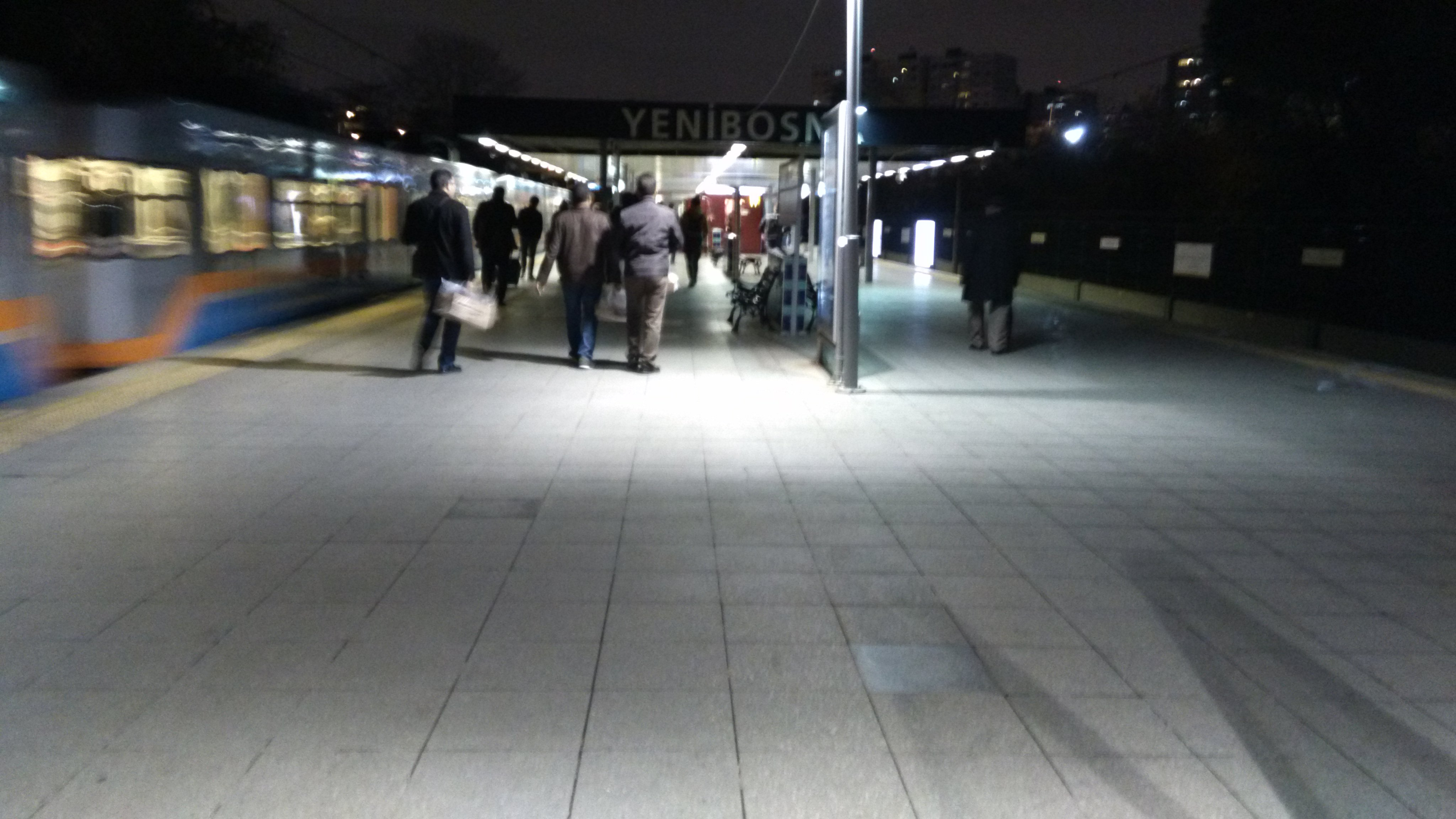
M1 platform prior to 2022 refurbishment

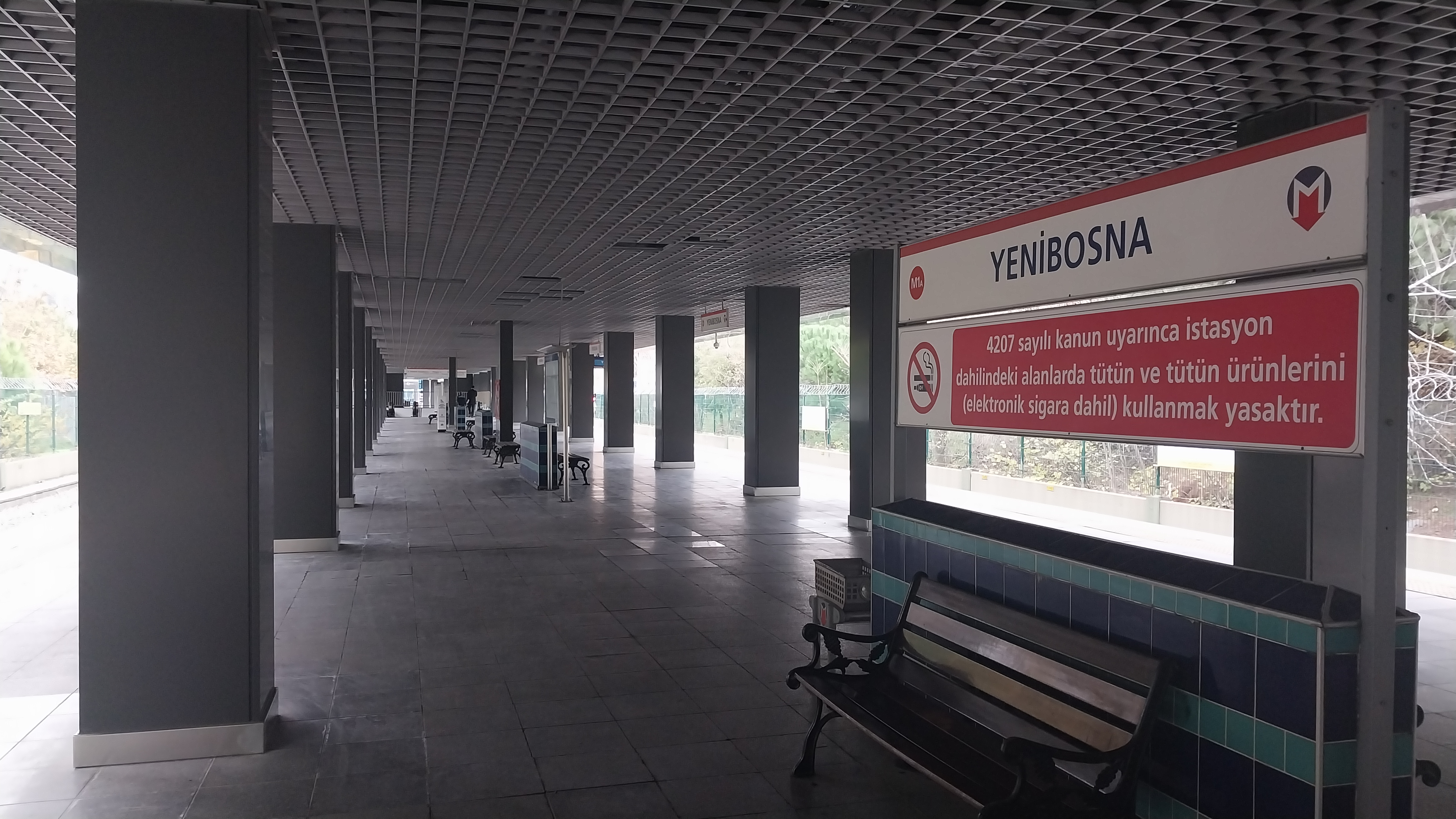
M1 platform after 2022 refurbishment

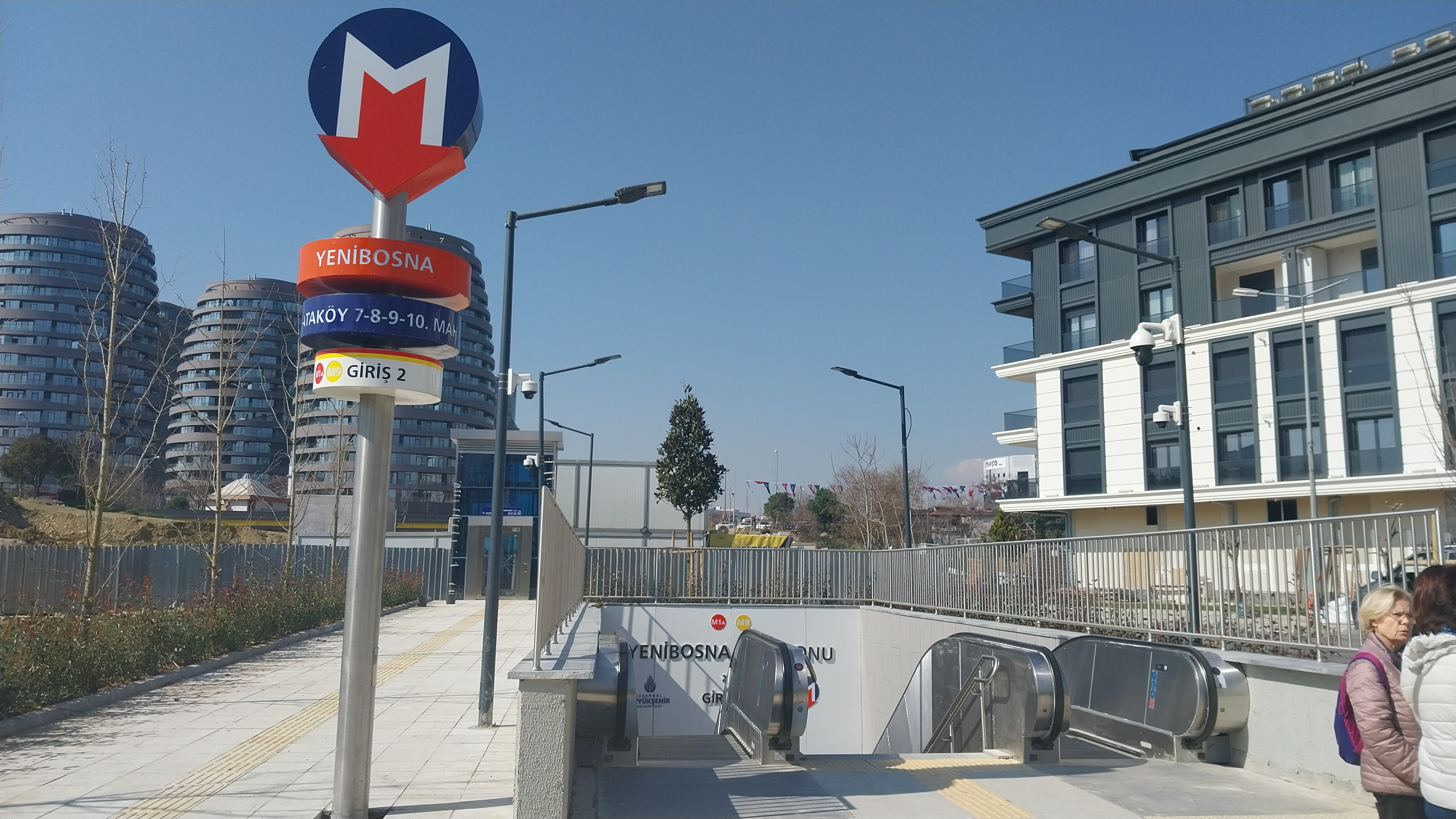
Entrance 2

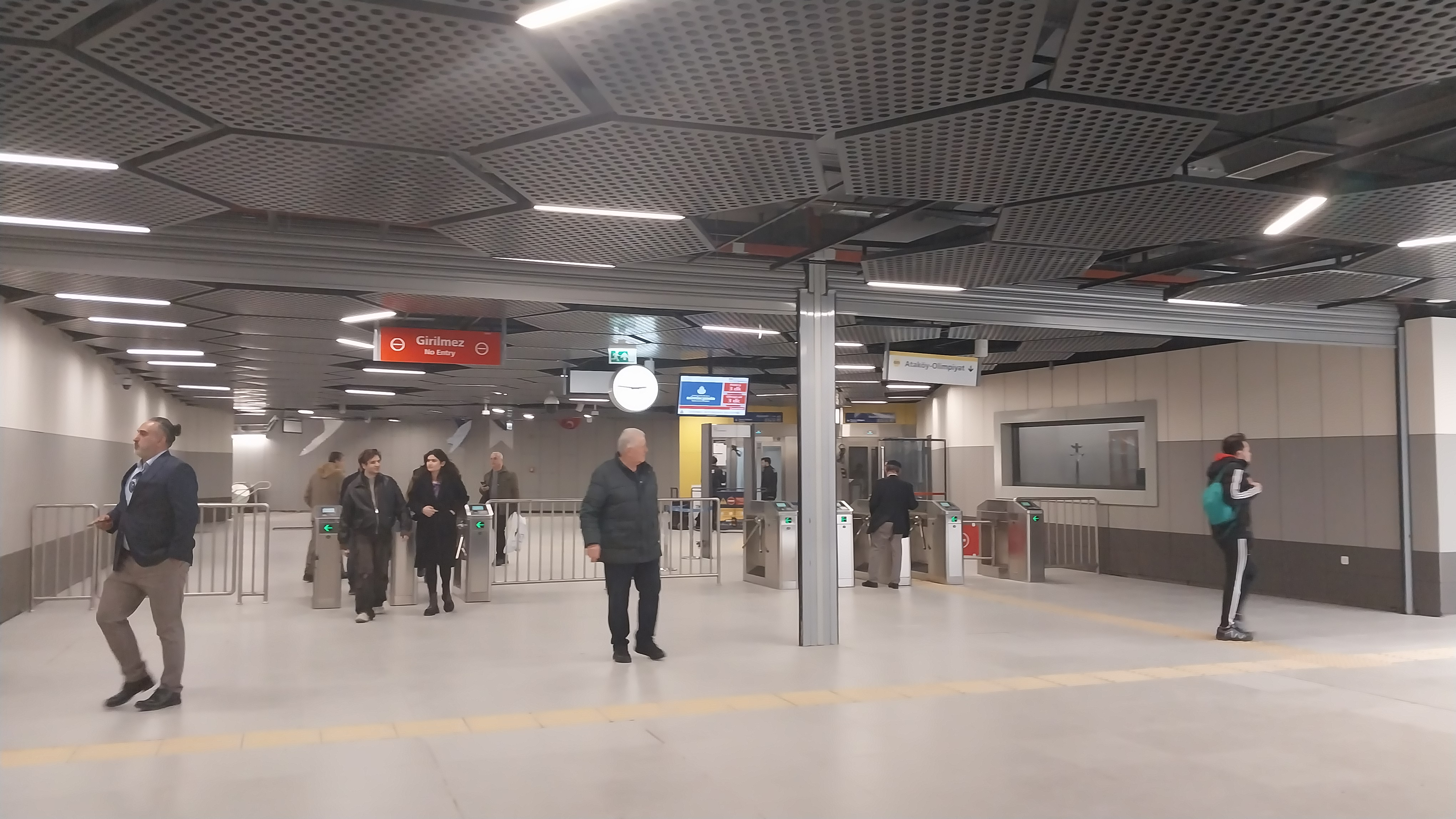
M9 ticket hall

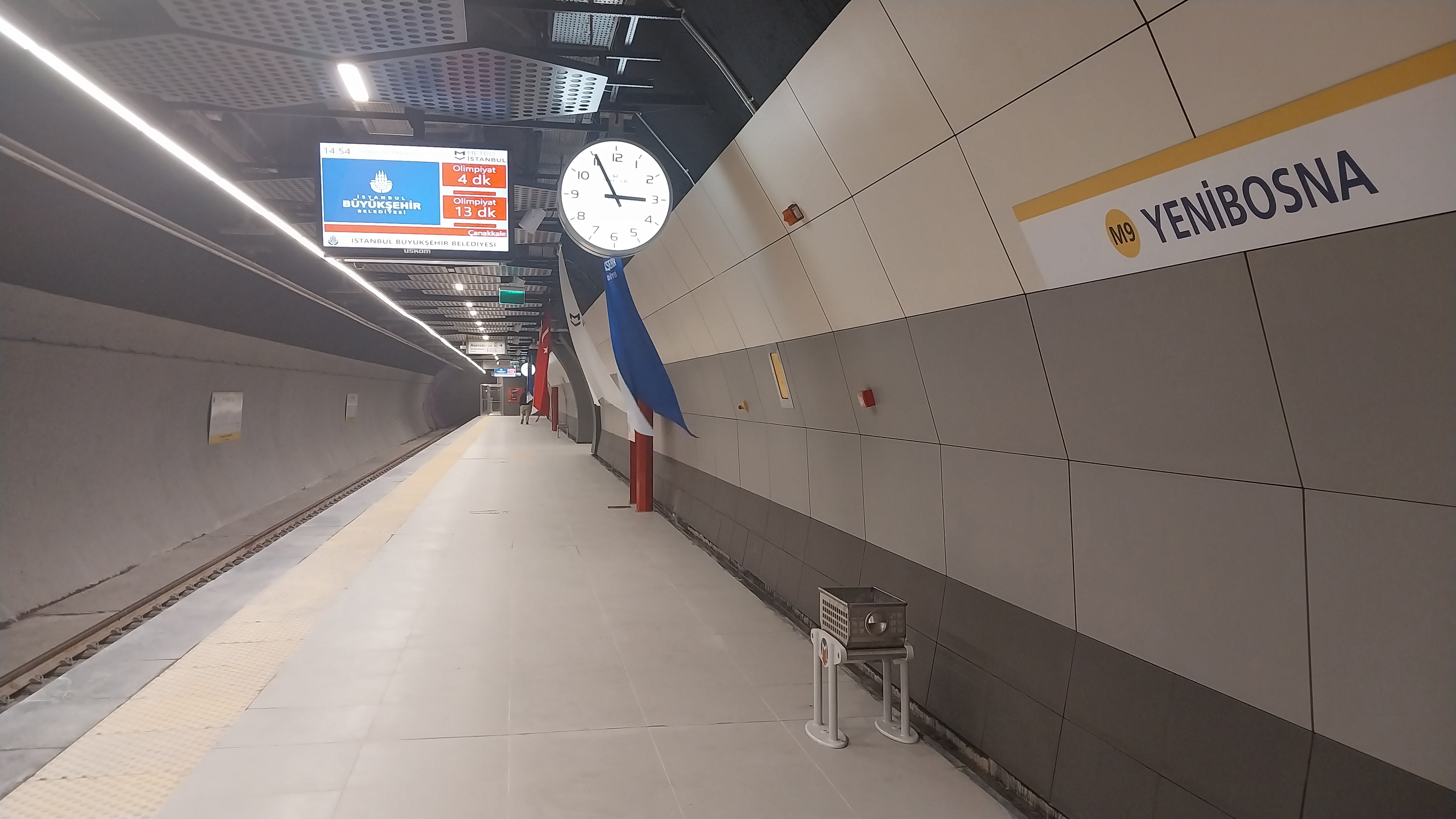
M9 platform

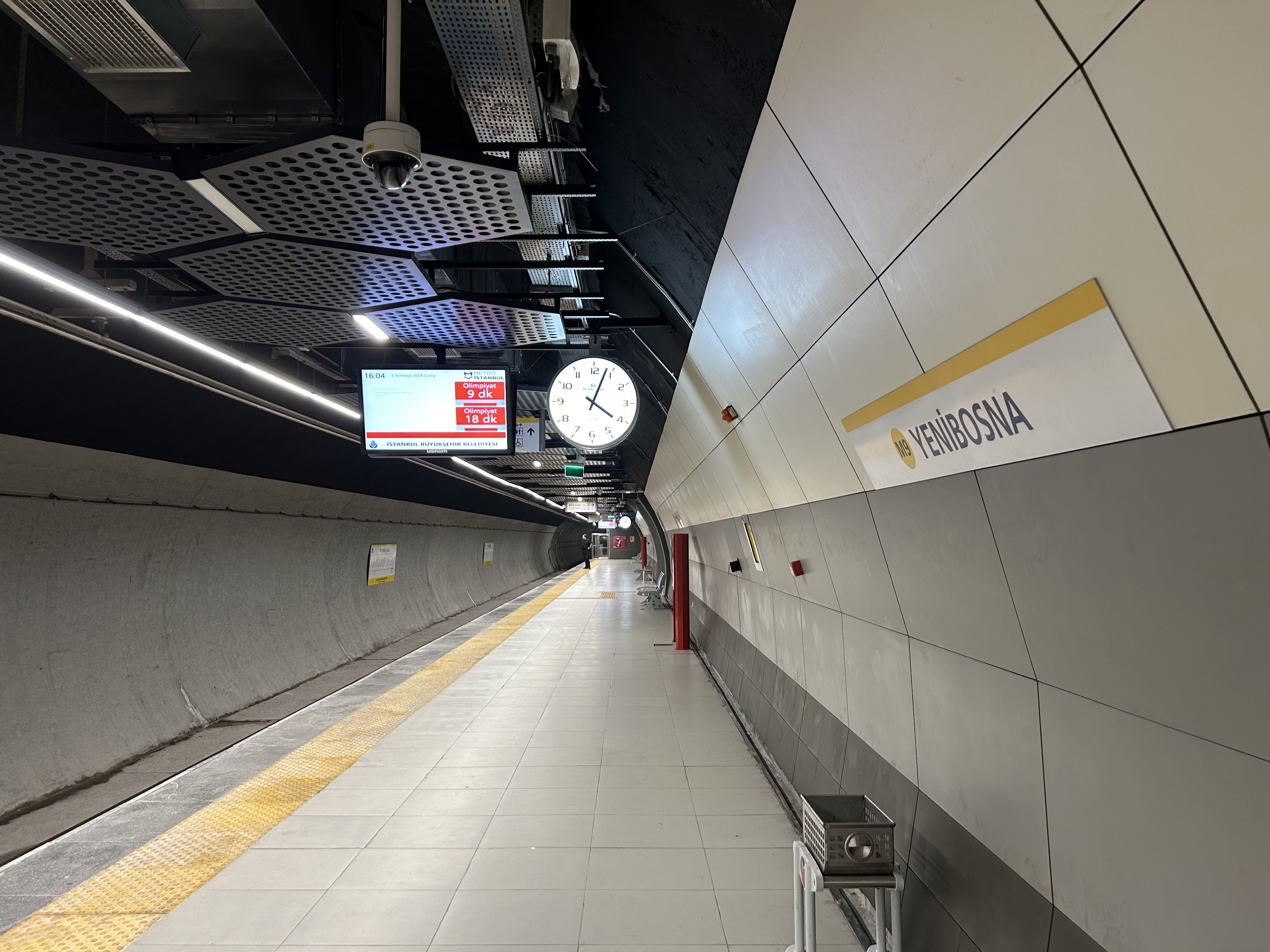
M9 platform
