= Atatürk Havalimanı station =

Station of the Istanbul Metro

Atatürk Havalimanı
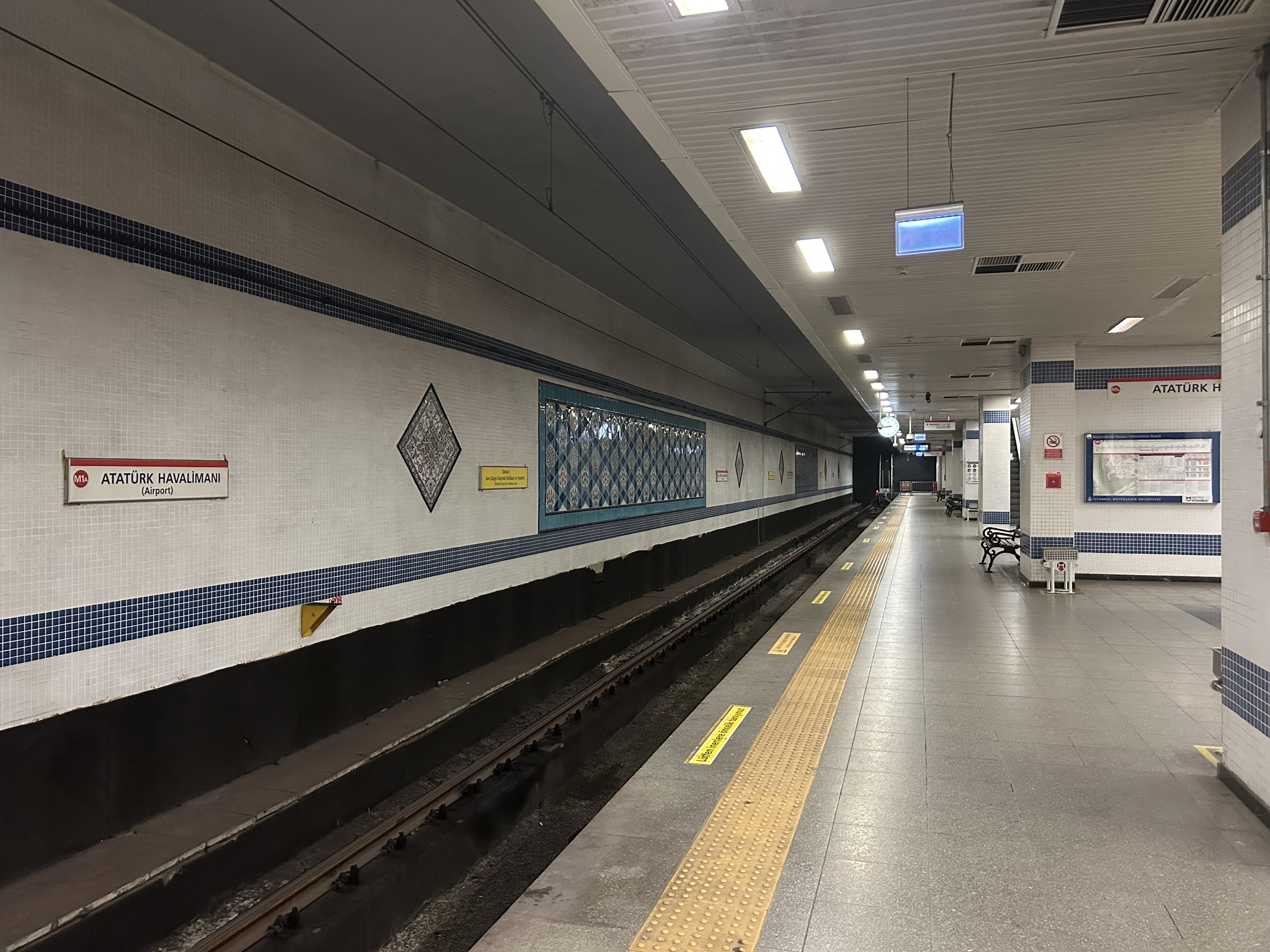
- The terminus of M1 metro line has tiled panels, and buffer stops at end of the platform

General information
- Location: Yeşilköy Neighborhood, Atatürk Airport, 34149; Bakırköy, Istanbul; Turkey
- Coordinates: 40°58′46″N 28°49′16″E
- System: Istanbul Metro rapid transit station
- Owner: Istanbul Metropolitan Municipality
- Line: M1A
- Platforms: 1 Island platform
- Tracks: 2
- Connections: İETT Bus: H-4, TH-1, YH-1

Construction
- Structure type: Underground
- Parking: Yes
- Cycle facilities: Yes
- Accessible: Yes

Other information
- IATA code: ISL

History
- Opened: 20 December 2002; 23 years ago
- Electrified: 750 V DC Overhead line

Services
Preceding station	Istanbul Metro	Following station
Terminus	M1a Line	DTM–İstanbul Fuar Merkezi towards Yenikapı
Location

Atatürk Havalimanı is the western terminal station on the M1A line of the Istanbul Metro. The station services Atatürk International Airport in Istanbul, which was the primary international gateway in Turkey. Atatürk Havalimanı was opened on 20 December 2002, along with DTM—İstanbul Fuar Merkezi, when the M1A (then just M1) was extended west of Yenibosna to the airport. The station is located next to the international terminal and is linked to the domestic terminal via a walkway.

As a result of the closing of Atatürk International Airport for commercial passenger traffic and its replacement by a new airport northwest of the city in April 2019, the station no longer receives passenger traffic. It will continue to serve the airport in its remaining functions, including business flights, cargo, and general aviation; and the area surrounding the airport. The M11, which will connect the new airport to the rest of the metro system, its first section opened on 22 January 2023.

== Layout ==
Track 2	toward Yenikapı (DTM–İstanbul Fuar Merkezi) →
Island platform, doors will open on the left or right
Track 1	toward Yenikapı (DTM–İstanbul Fuar Merkezi) →

== Gallery ==
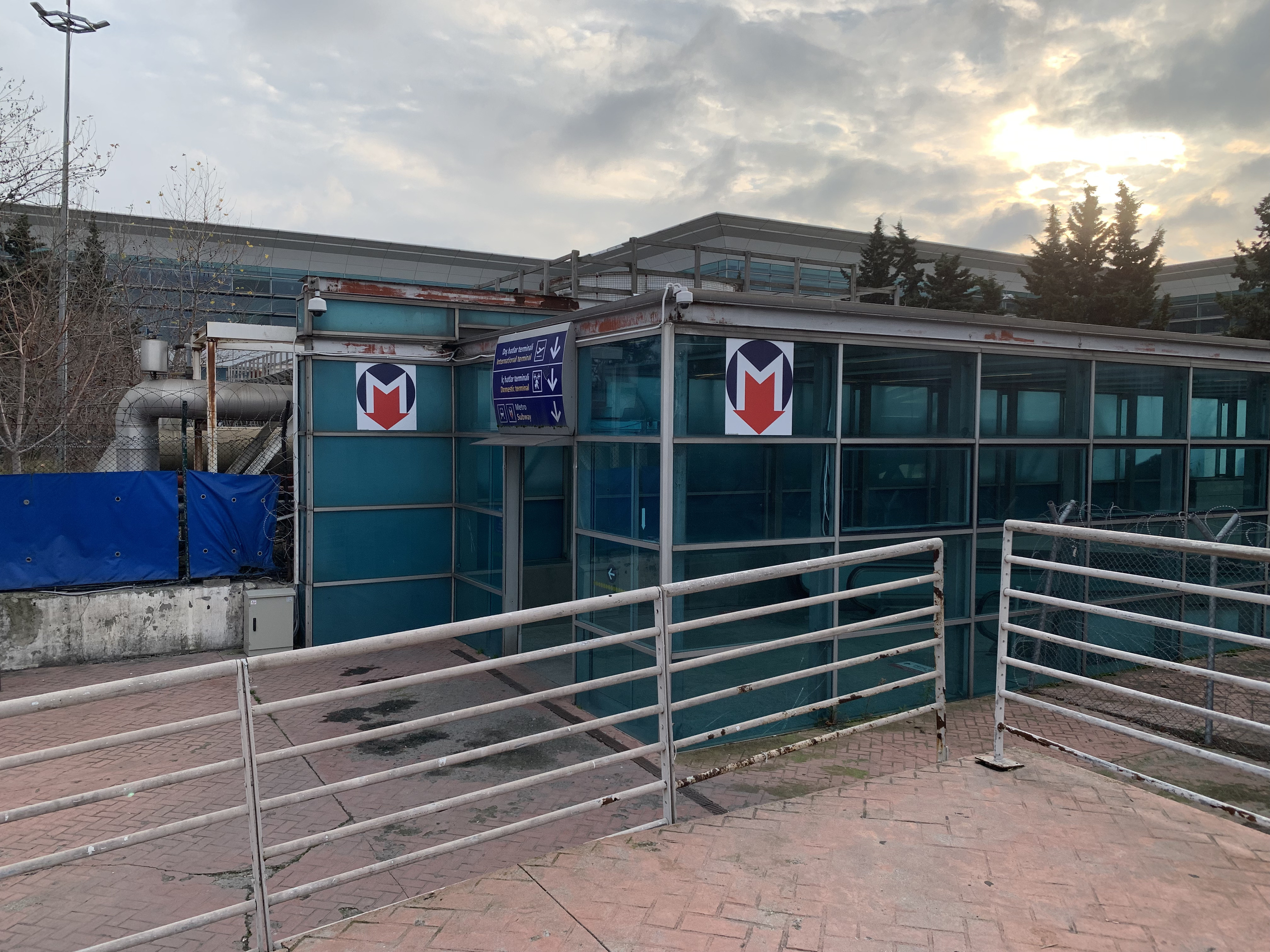
Entrance

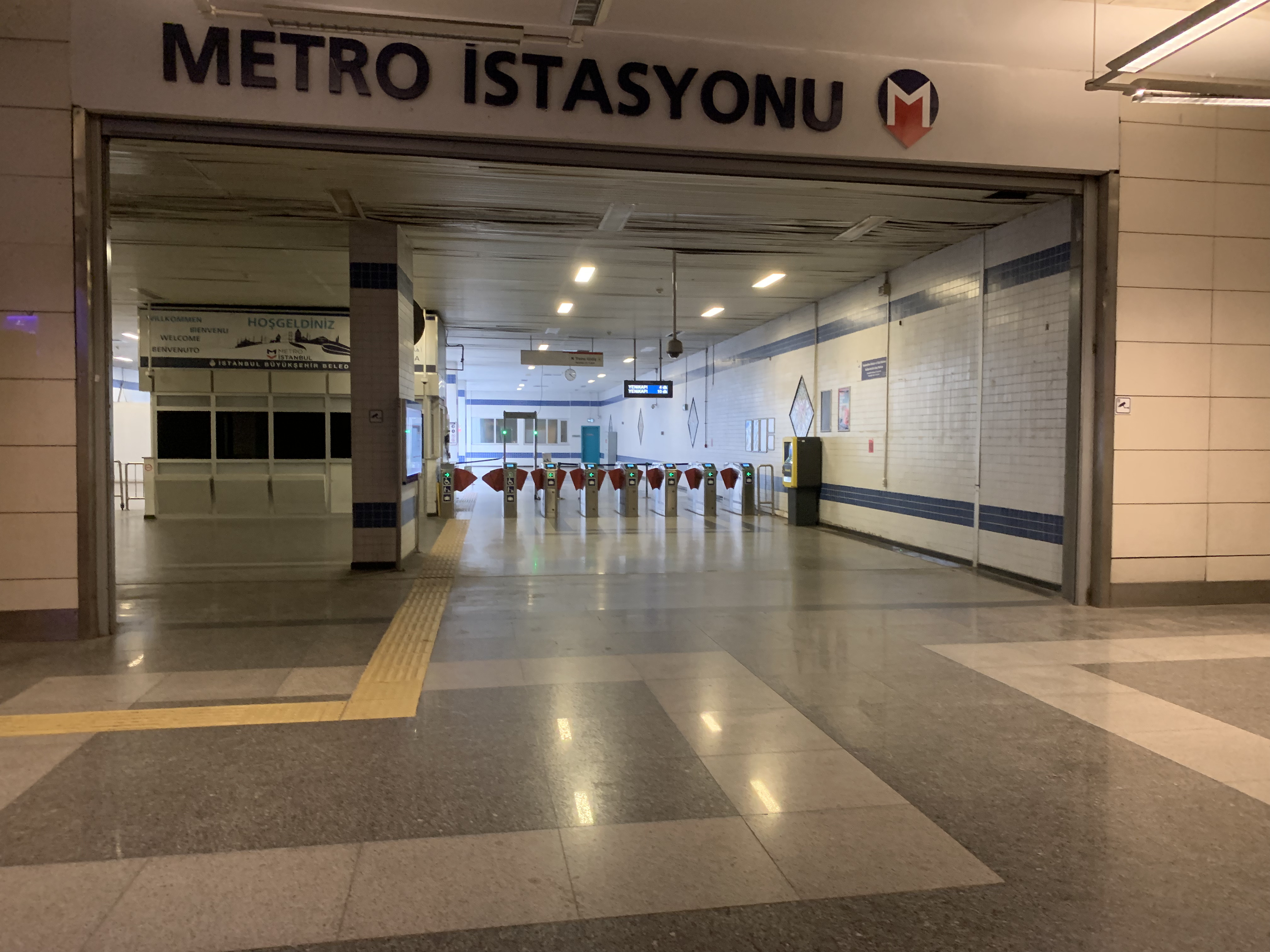
Ticket hall (from outside)

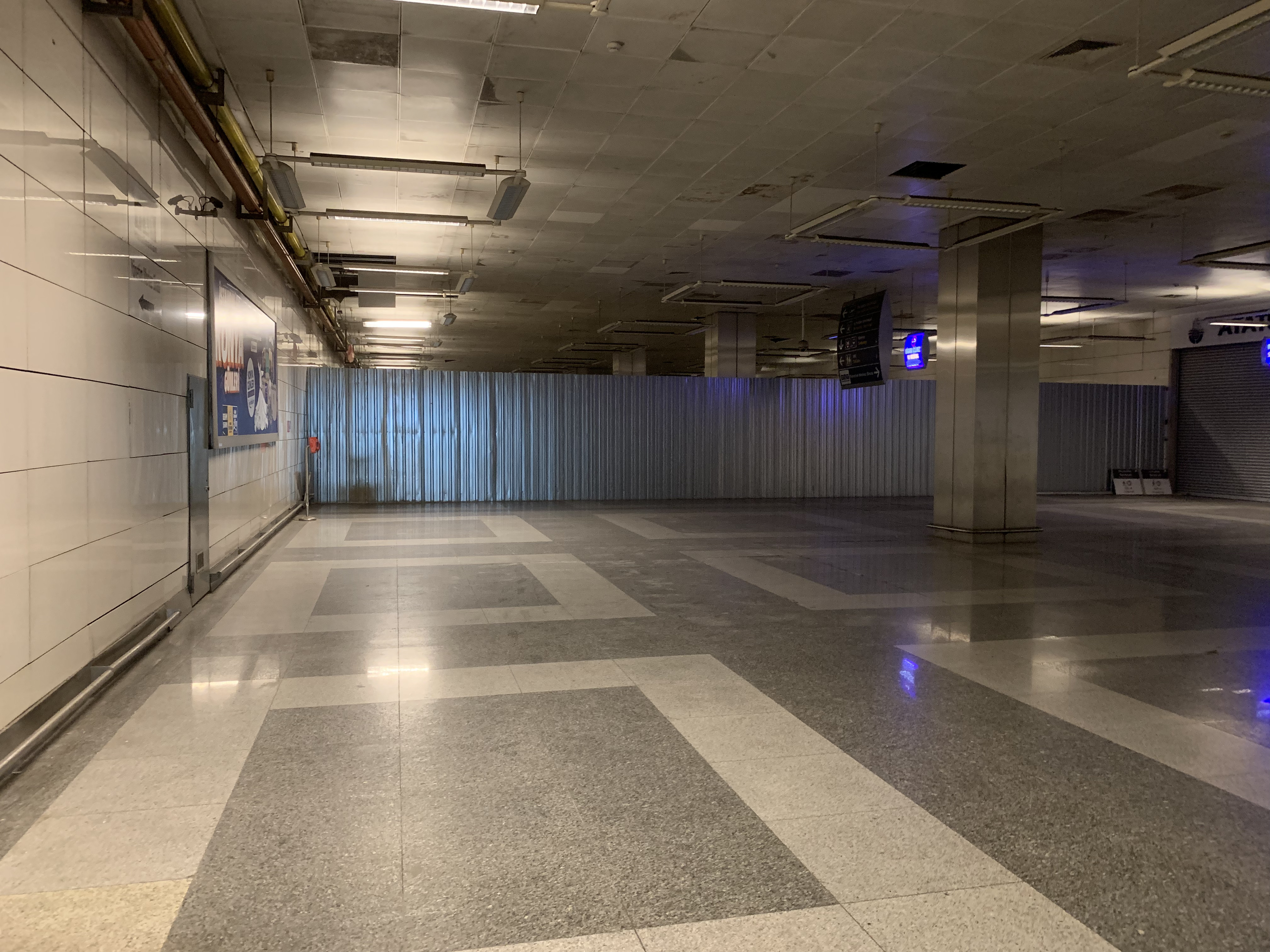
Closed Atatürk Airport crossing

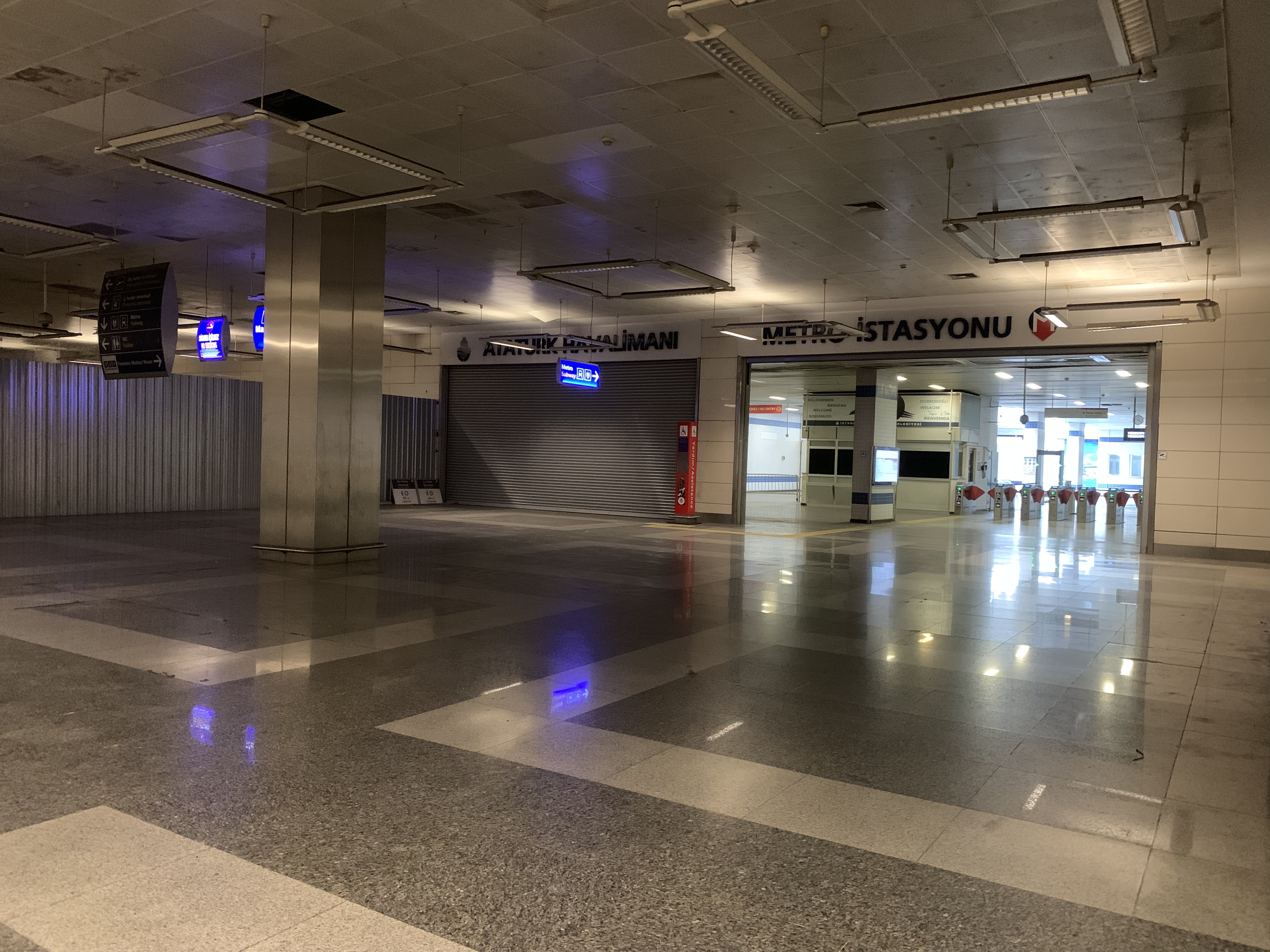
Airport terminal building entrance

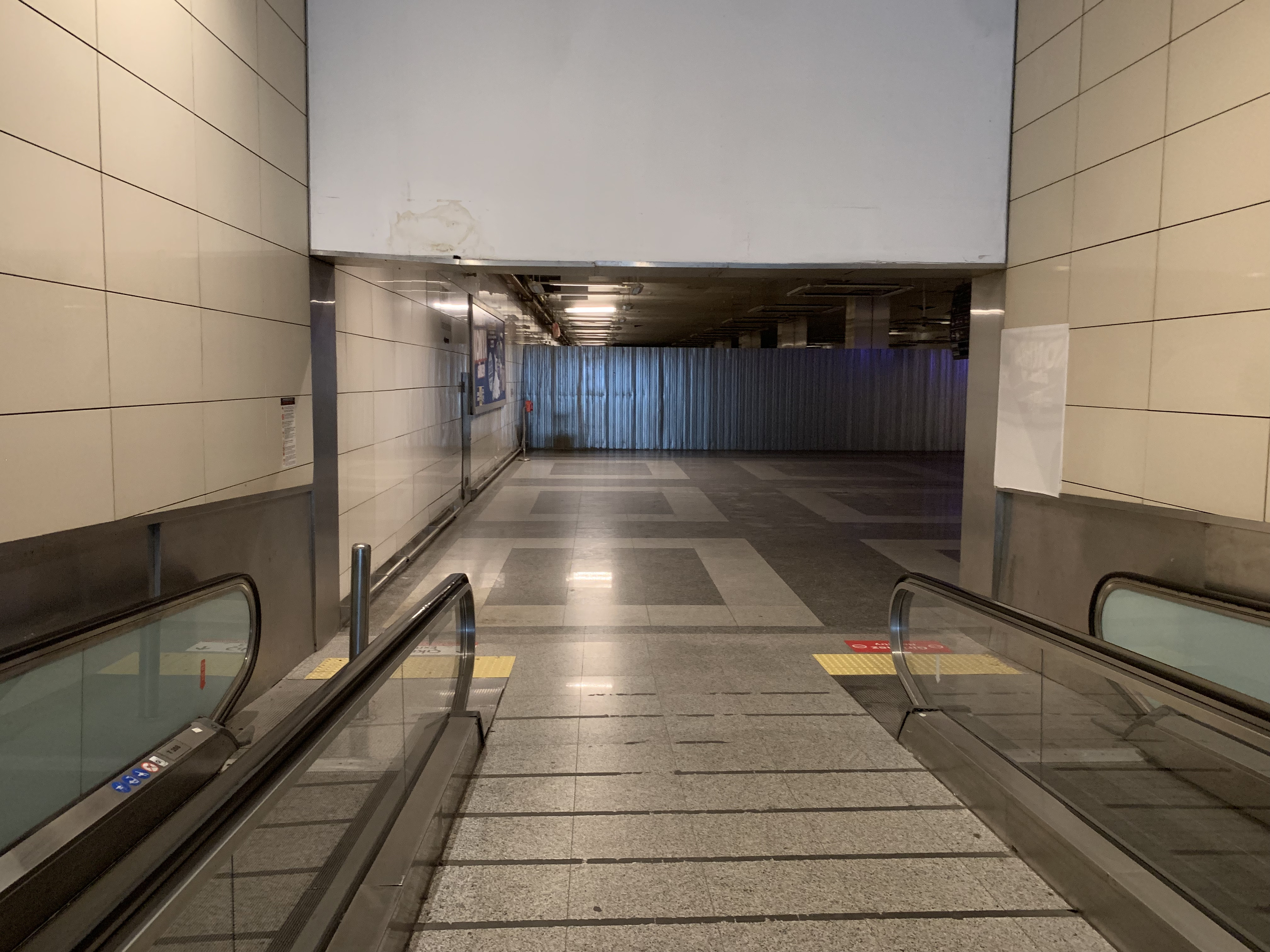
End of the moving walkways leading down from the station entrance to the turnstile level
