= Yenimahalle station (M3) =

Station of the Istanbul Metro

Yenimahalle
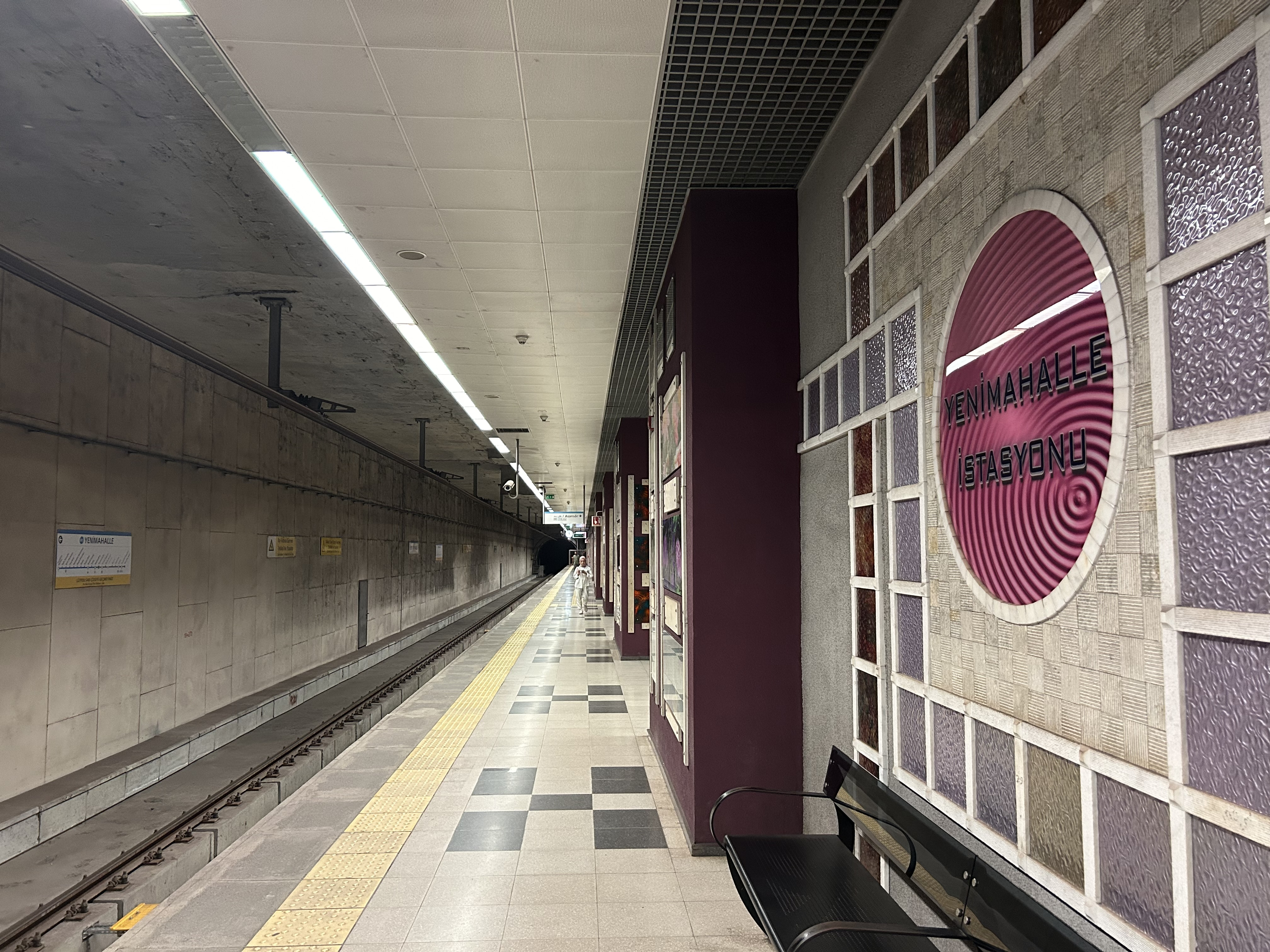
- Platform

General information
- Location: Yenimahalle Neighborhood, Dökümcüler Street, 34100; Bağcılar, Istanbul; Turkey
- Coordinates: 41°2′24″N 28°50′10″E
- System: Istanbul Metro rapid transit station
- Owner: Istanbul Metropolitan Municipality
- Operator: Metro Istanbul A.Ş.
- Line: M3
- Platforms: 1 island platform
- Tracks: 2
- Connections: İETT Bus: 92A; Istanbul Minibus: Bakırköy Metro-Yenimahalle Metro

Construction
- Structure type: Underground
- Parking: No
- Cycle facilities: Yes
- Accessible: Yes

History
- Opened: 14 June 2013
- Electrified: 1,500 V DC Overhead line

Services
Preceding station	Istanbul Metro	Following station
Mahmutbey towards Kayaşehir Merkez	M3 Line	Kirazlı towards Bakırköy Sahil
Location

Yenimahalle is an underground station on the M3 line of the Istanbul Metro in Bağcılar, Istanbul. The station is located beneath Dökümcüler Avenue in the Yenimahalle neighborhood of Bağcılar. Yenimahalle was opened on 14 June 2013 along with the Kirazlı-MetroKent portion of the M3.

== Station Layout ==
P Platform level	Northbound	← toward Kayaşehir Merkez (Mahmutbey)
P Platform level	Island platform, doors will open on the left
P Platform level	Southbound	toward Bakırköy Sahil (Kirazlı) →

== Operation information ==
The line operates between 06:00 and 00:00 and train frequency is 7 minutes at peak hours and 10 minutes at all other times. The line has no night service.

== Gallery ==
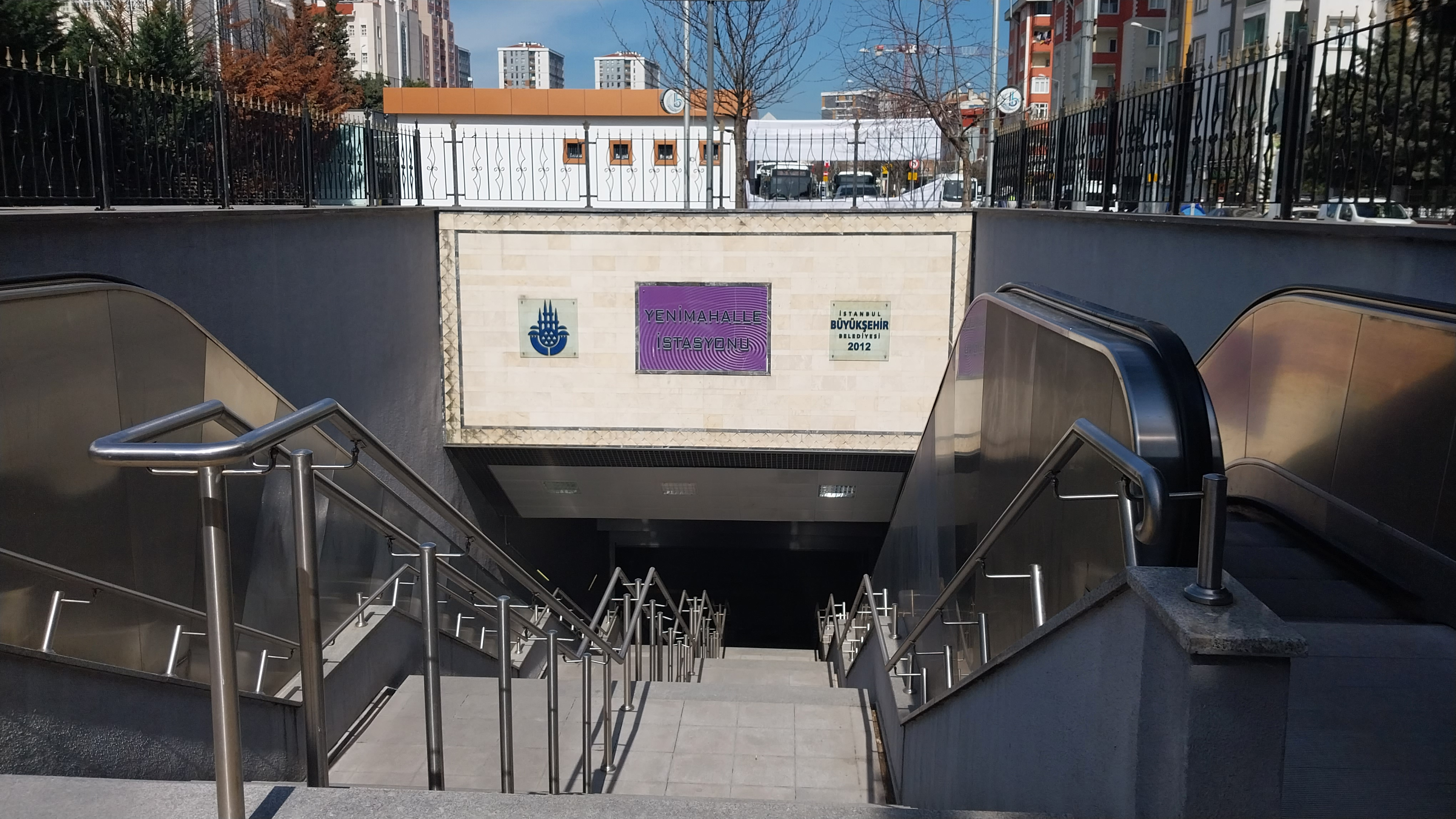
Entrance

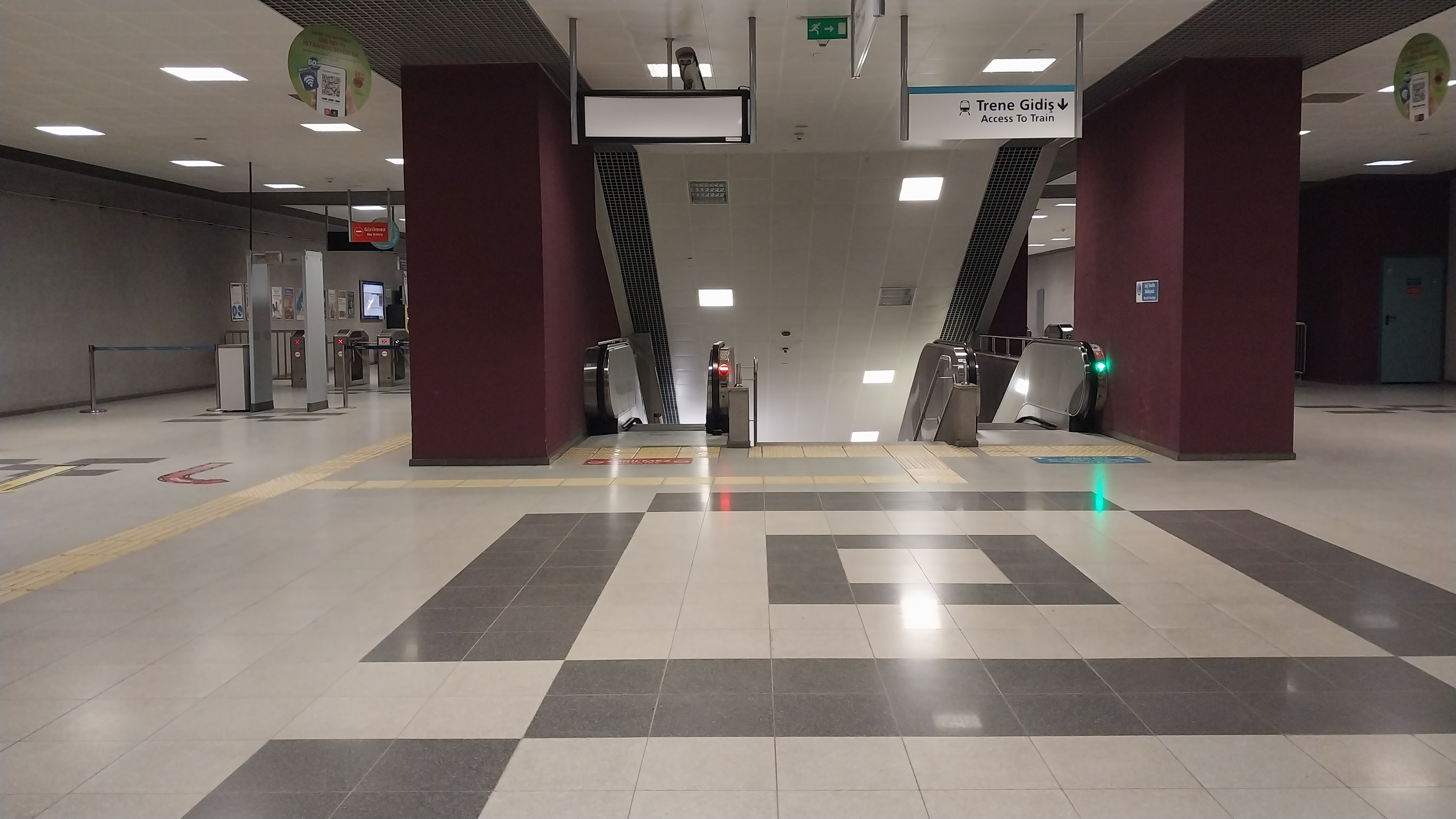
Ticket hall

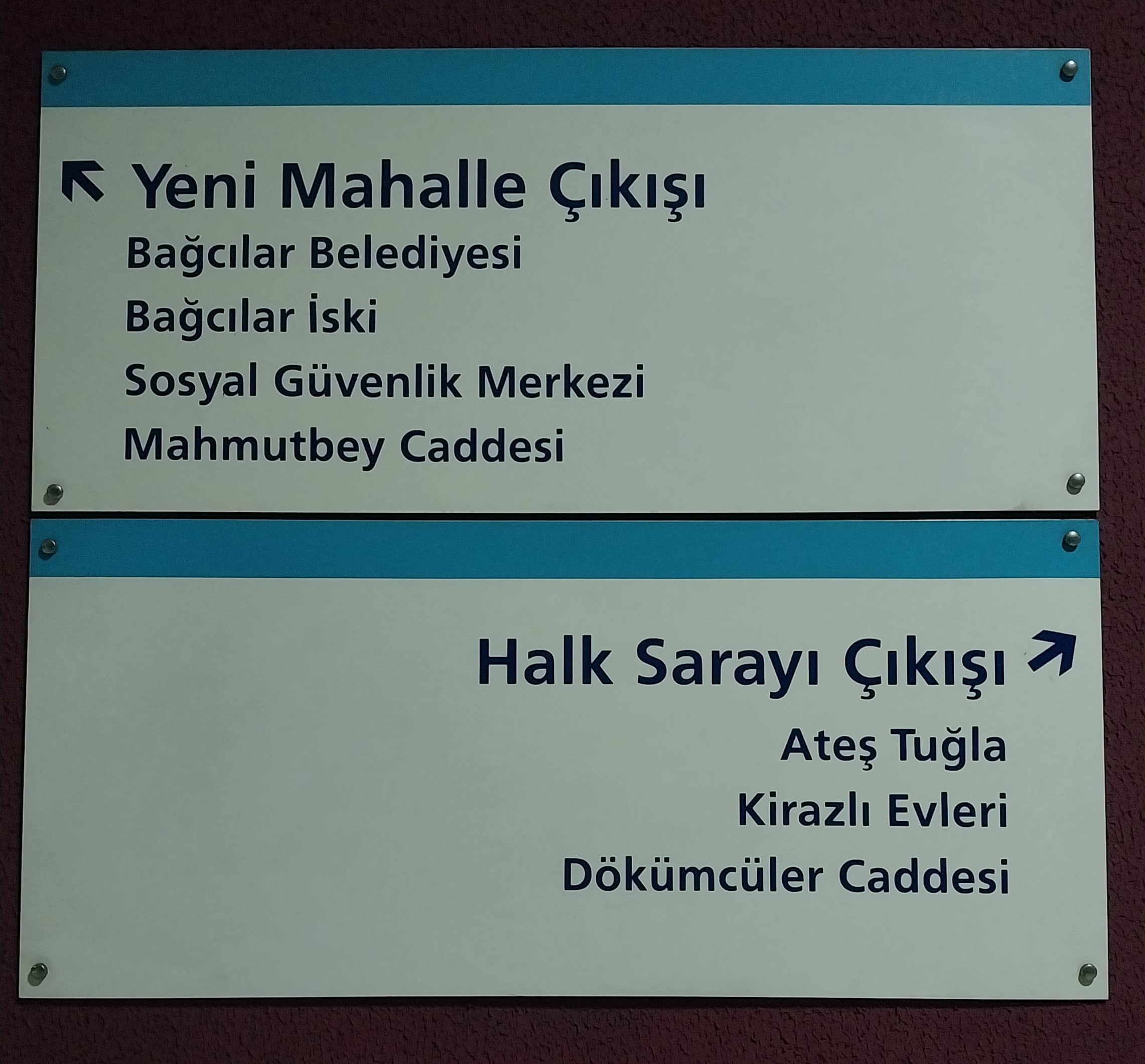
Exit sign

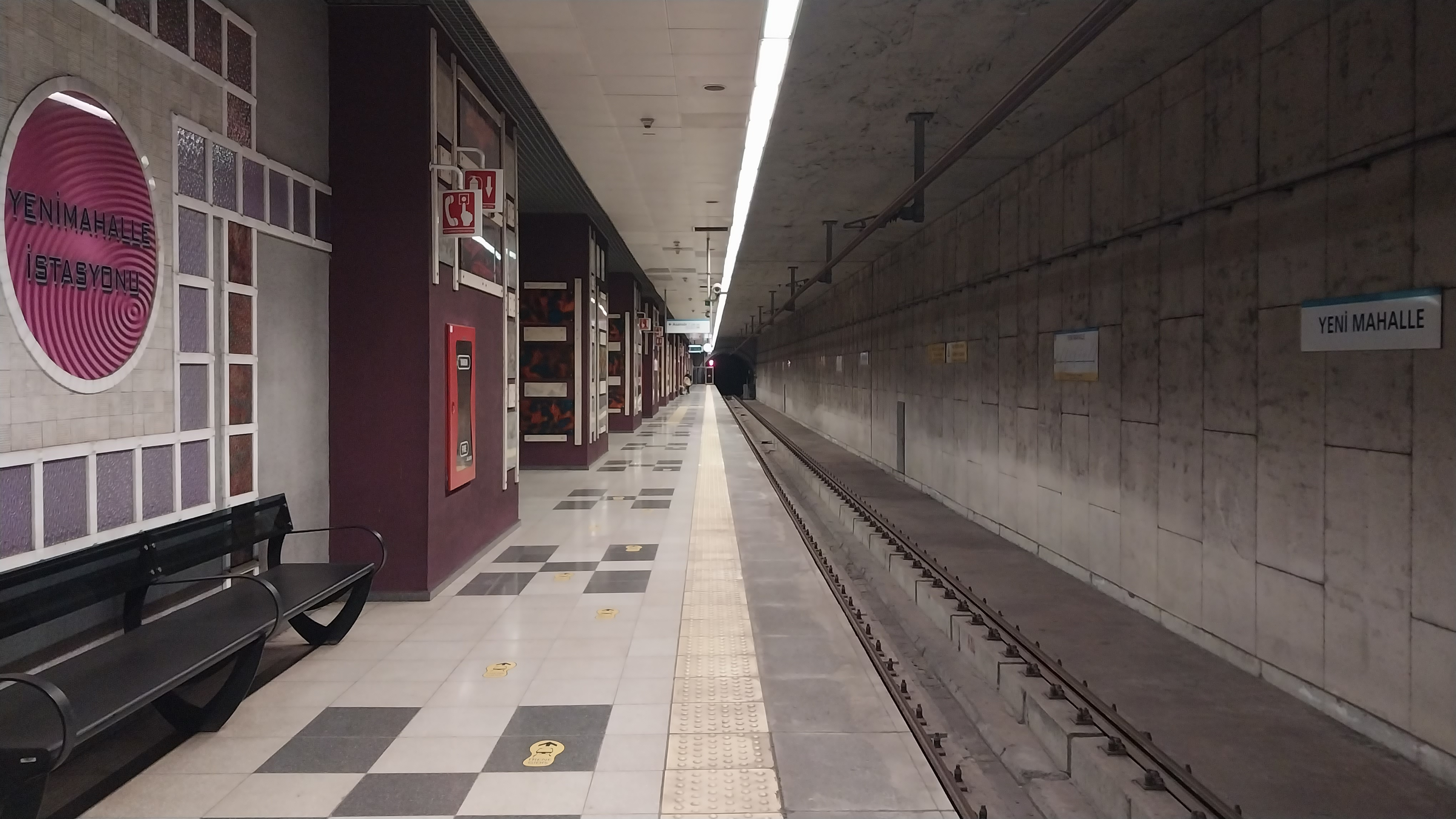
Platform

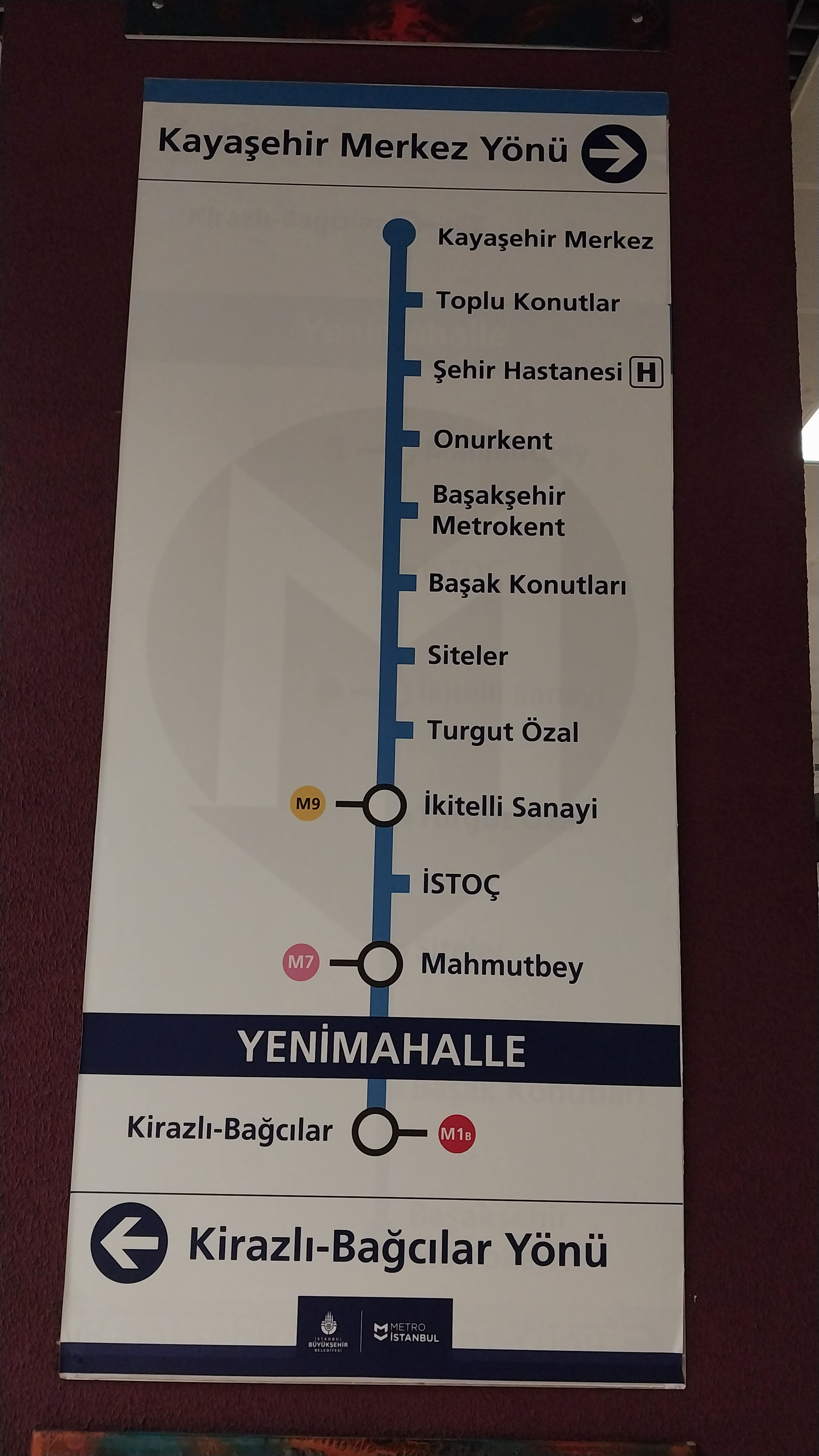
Route map

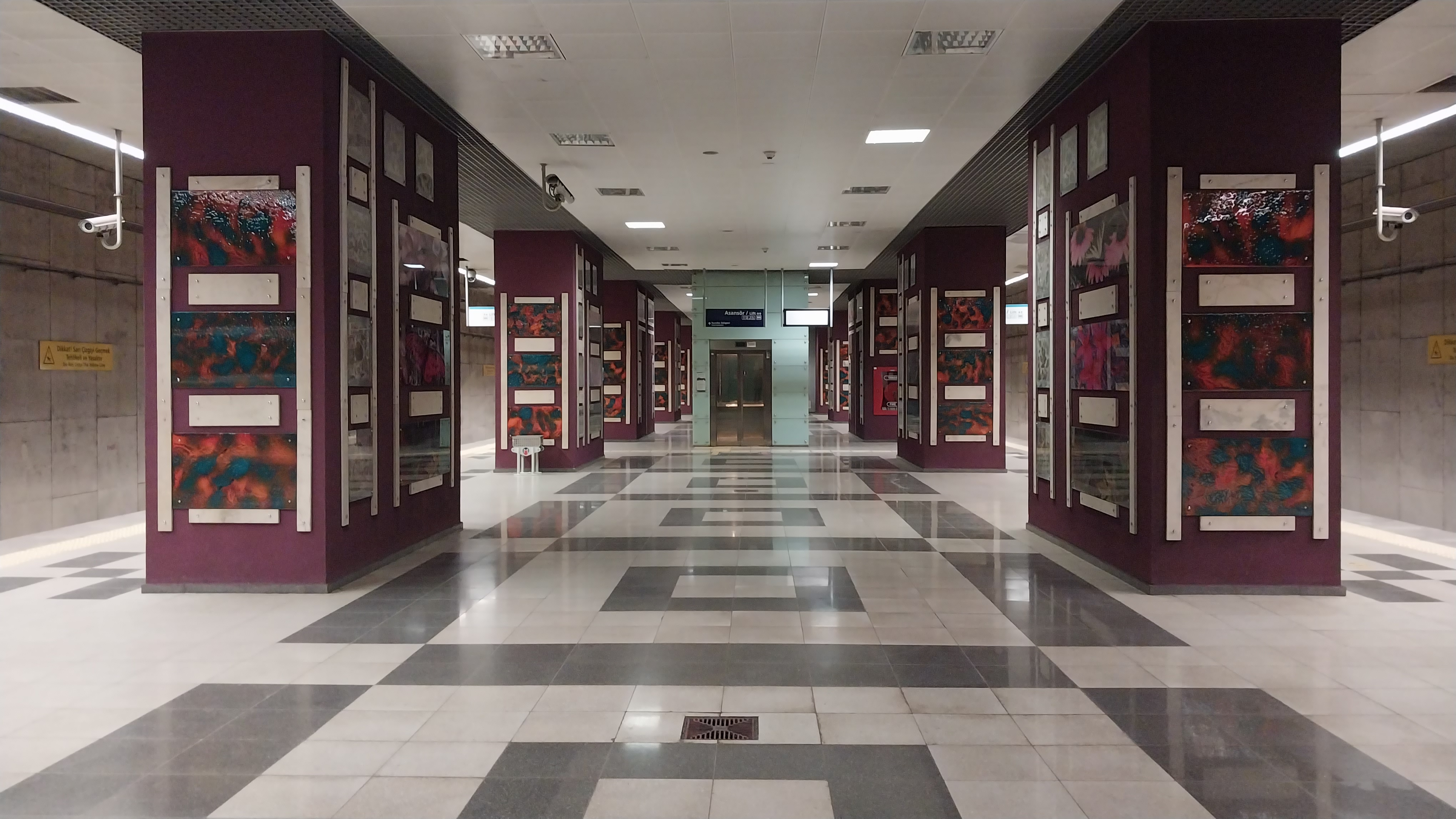
Platform width
