= Başak Konutları station =

Station of the Istanbul Metro

Başak Konutları
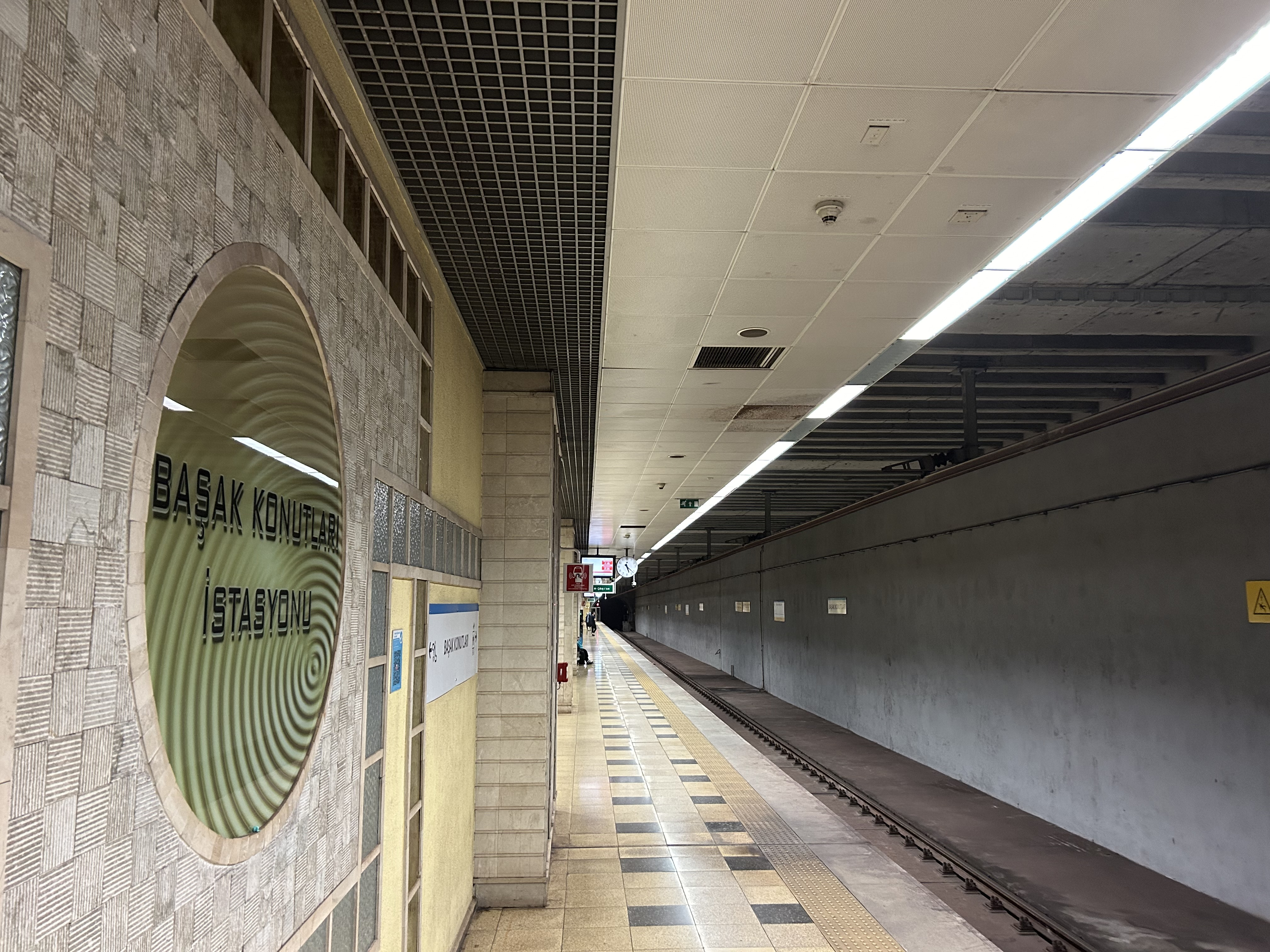
- Platform

General information
- Location: Başakşehir Neighborhood, Hürriyet Boulevard, 34480; Başakşehir, Istanbul; Turkey
- Coordinates: 41°5′50″N 28°47′28″E
- System: Istanbul Metro rapid transit station
- Owner: Istanbul Metropolitan Municipality
- Line: M3
- Platforms: 1 island platform
- Tracks: 2
- Connections: İETT Bus: 78C, 78E, 78F, 78ZB, 79E, 79Ş, 82S, 89C, 98, 98KM, 143, 146B, 146K, 146M; Istanbul Minibus: Küçükçekmece-Deprem Konutları, Küçükçekmece-Kayaşehir, Şirinevler-Başakşehir, Şirinevler-Kayaşehir-Fenertepe

Construction
- Structure type: Underground
- Parking: Yes
- Cycle facilities: No
- Accessible: Yes

History
- Opened: 14 June 2013; 13 years ago
- Electrified: 1,500 V DC Overhead line

Services
Preceding station	Istanbul Metro	Following station
Başakşehir-Metrokent towards Kayaşehir Merkez	M3 Line	Siteler towards Bakırköy Sahil
Location

Başak Konutları is an underground rapid transit station on the M3 line of the Istanbul Metro. It is located in central Başakşehir at the junction of Atatürk and Hürriyet Boulevards. The station was opened on 14 June 2013 and has an island platform serviced by two tracks.

== Layout ==
Northbound	← toward Kayaşehir Merkez (Başakşehir-Metrokent)
Island platform, doors will open on the left
Southbound	toward Bakırköy Sahil (Siteler) →

== Operation information ==
The line operates between 06:00 and 00:00 and train frequency is 7 minutes at peak hours and 10 minutes at all other times. The line has no night service.
