= Siteler station =

Station of the Istanbul Metro

Siteler
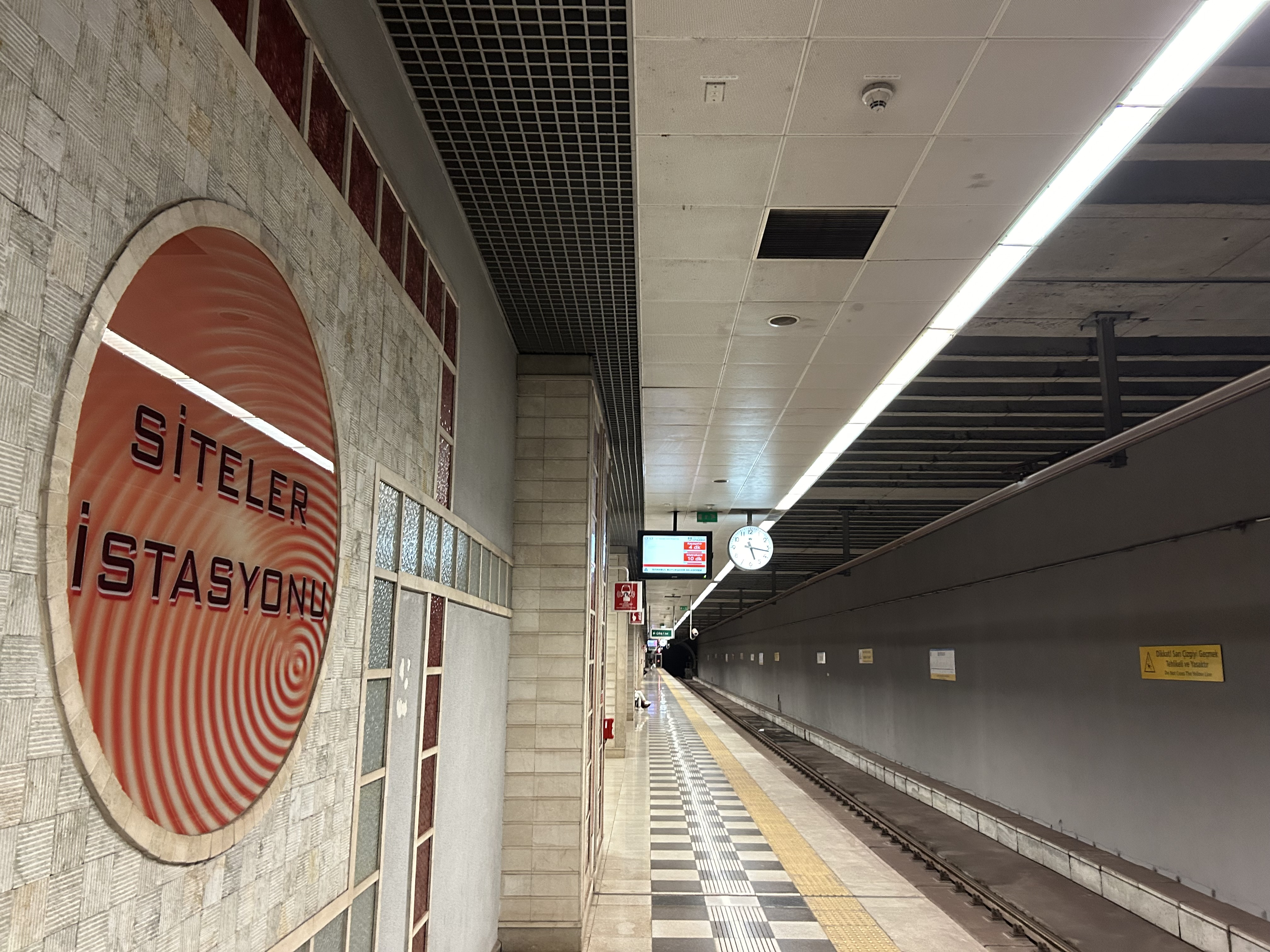
- Platform

General information
- Location: Başakşehir Neighborhood, Süleyman Demirel Street, 34480; Başakşehir, Istanbul; Turkey
- Coordinates: 41°5′17″N 28°47′48″E
- System: Istanbul Metro rapid transit station
- Owner: Istanbul Metropolitan Municipality
- Line: M3
- Platforms: 1 island platform
- Tracks: 2
- Connections: İETT Bus: 78, 78C, 78FB, 78G, 78H, 78Ş, 79B, 79E, 79T, 82S, 98H, 98KM, 146B, 146K, 146M, MK31; Istanbul Minibus: Şirinevler-Kayaşehir

Construction
- Structure type: Underground
- Parking: No
- Cycle facilities: Yes
- Accessible: Yes

History
- Opened: 14 June 2013; 13 years ago
- Electrified: 1,500 V DC Overhead line

Services
Preceding station	Istanbul Metro	Following station
Başak Konutları towards Kayaşehir Merkez	M3 Line	Turgut Özal towards Bakırköy Sahil
Location

Siteler is an underground rapid transit station on the M3 line of the Istanbul Metro. It is located in south-central Başakşehir under Süleyman Demirel Avenue and services Atatürk Sanayi Mahallesi. The station was opened on 14 June 2013 and has an island platform serviced by two tracks.

== Layout ==
Northbound	← toward Kayaşehir Merkez (Başak Konutları)
Island platform, doors will open on the left
Southbound	toward Bakırköy Sahil (Turgut Özal) →

== Operation information ==
The line operates between 06:00 and 00:00 and train frequency is 7 minutes at peak hours and 10 minutes at all other times. The line has no night service.

== Gallery ==
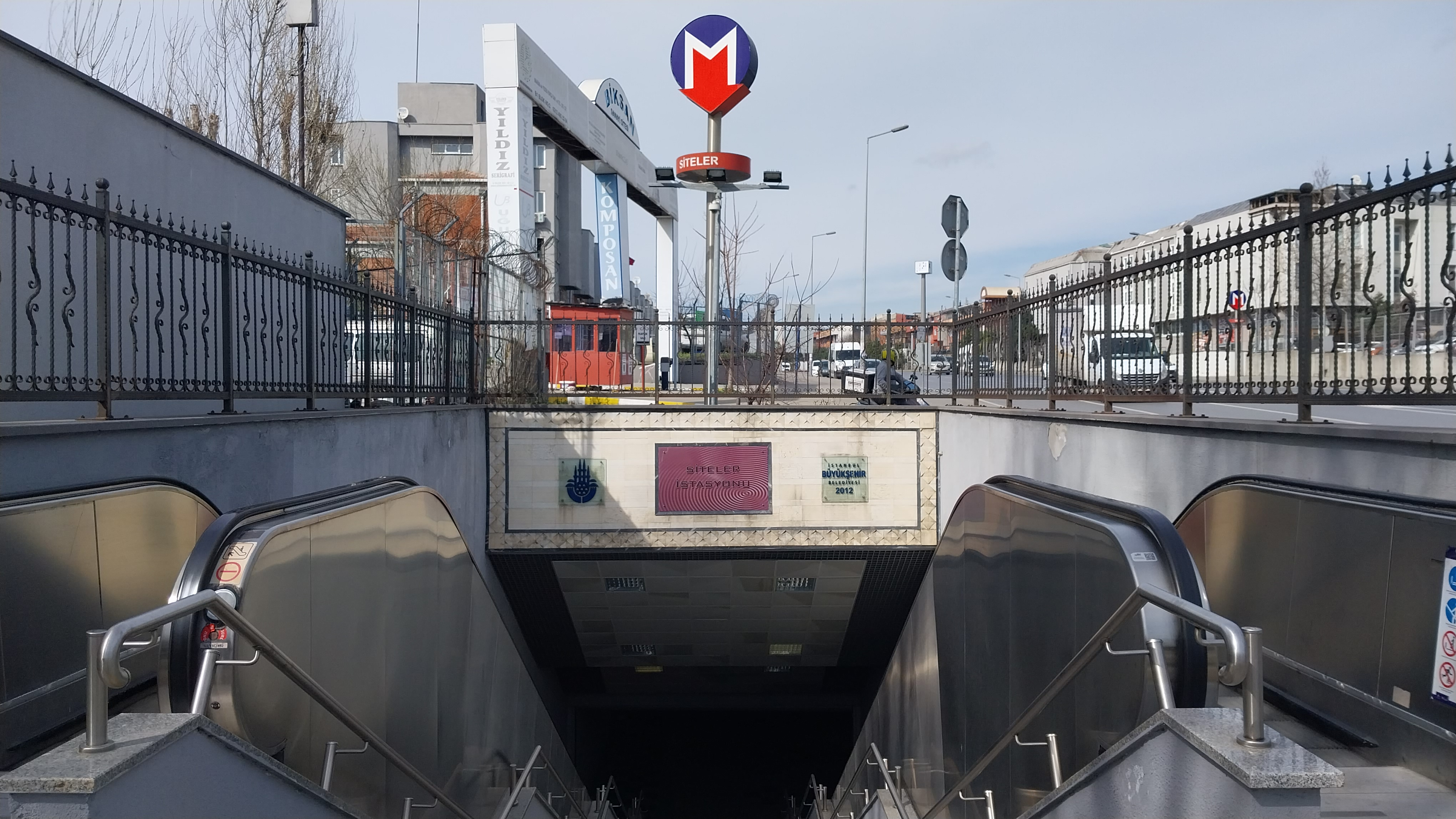
Entrance

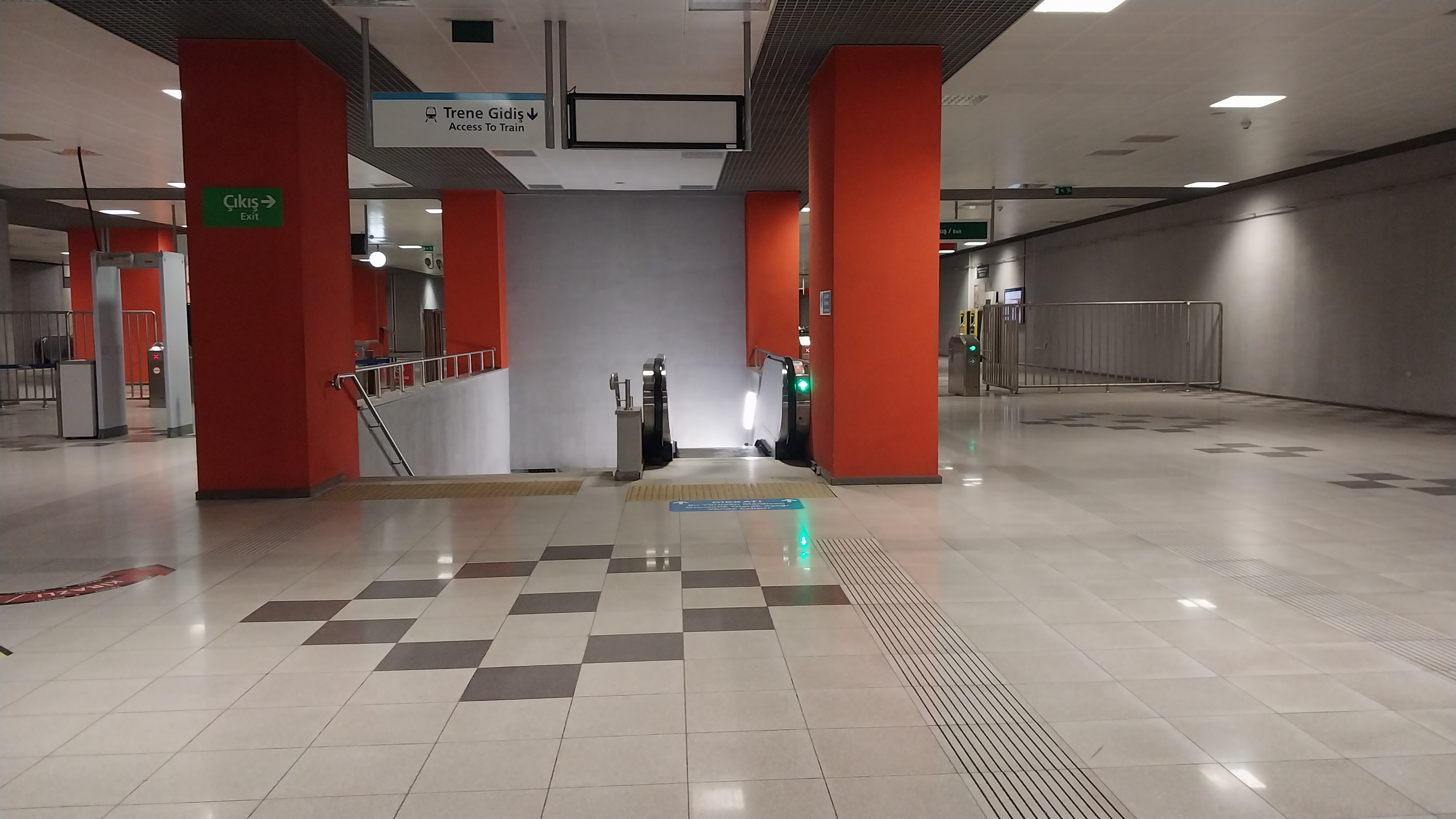
Ticket hall

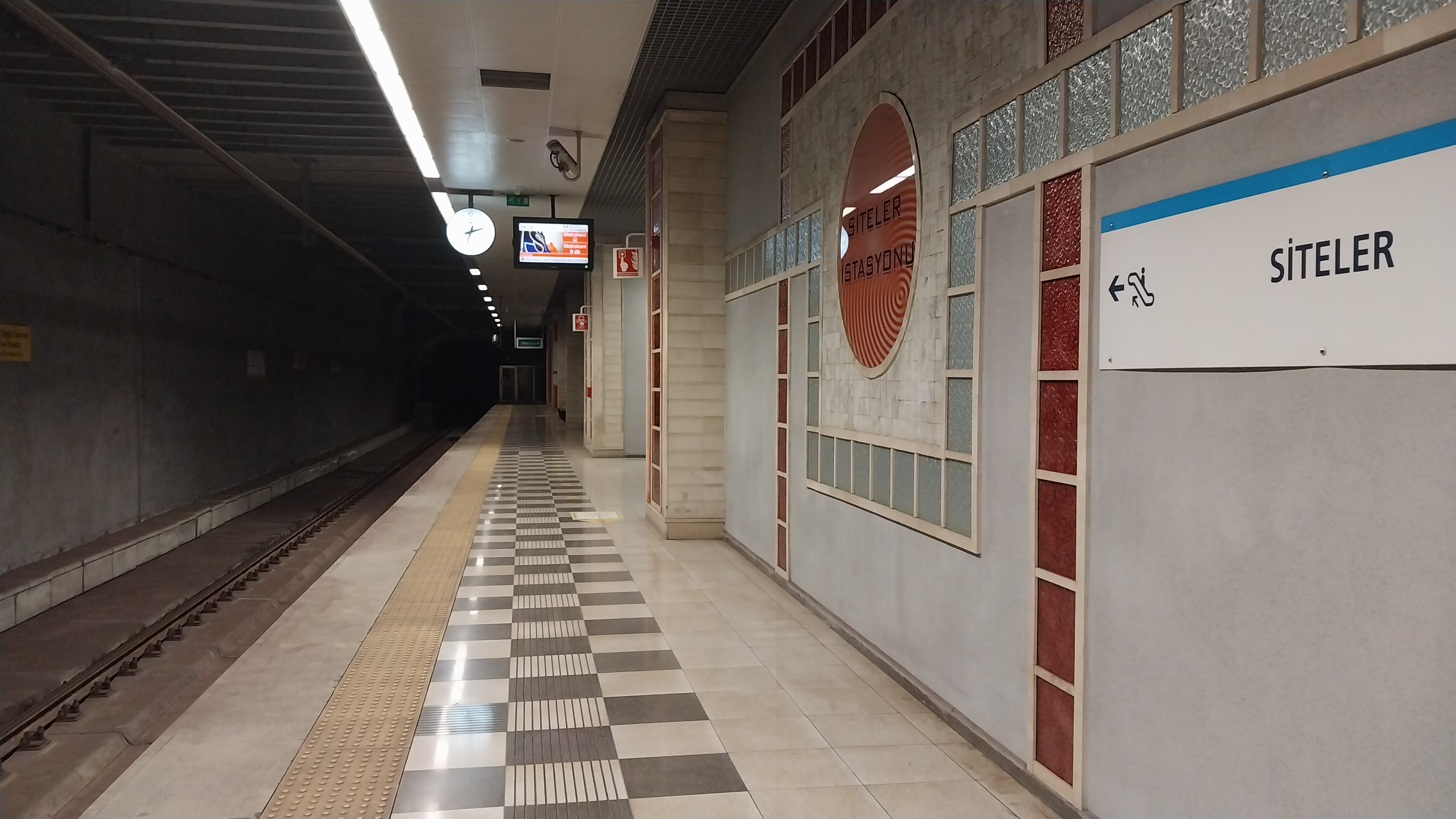
Platform
