= Başakşehir-Metrokent station =

Station of the Istanbul Metro

Başakşehir-Metrokent
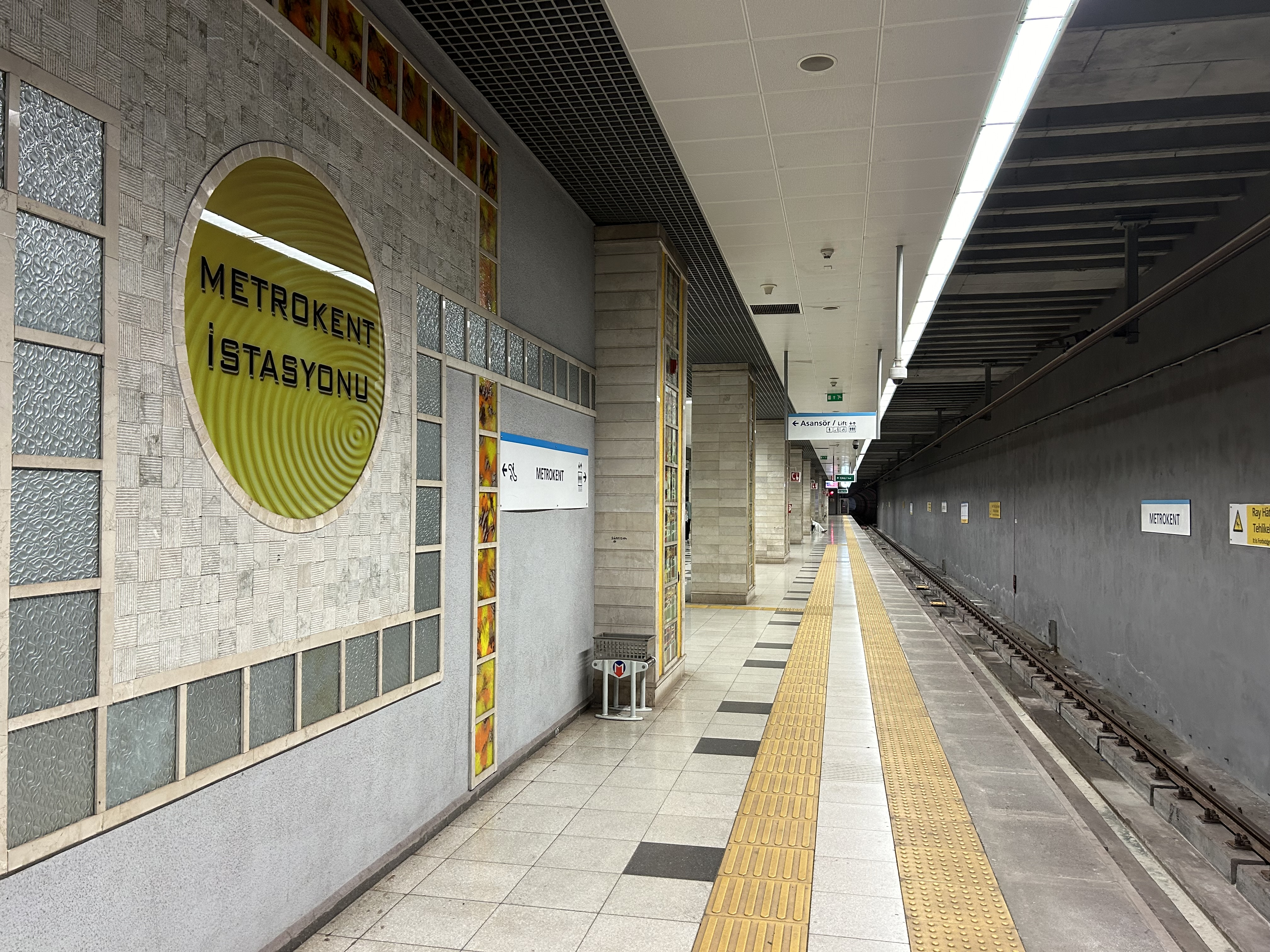
- Platform

General information
- Location: Başakşehir Neighborhood, Şeyh Şamil Street, 34480; Başakşehir, Istanbul; Turkey
- Coordinates: 41°6′29″N 28°48′5″E
- System: Istanbul Metro rapid transit station
- Owner: Istanbul Metropolitan Municipality
- Line: M3
- Platforms: 1 island platform
- Tracks: 2
- Connections: İETT Bus: 78, 78BE, 78F, 89C, 98H, 98KM, 146B, MK1, MK22; Istanbul Minibus: Deprem Konutları-Otogar

Construction
- Structure type: Underground
- Accessible: Yes

History
- Opened: 14 June 2013; 13 years ago
- Electrified: 1,500 V DC Overhead line

Services
Preceding station	Istanbul Metro	Following station
Onurkent towards Kayaşehir Merkez	M3 Line	Başak Konutları towards Bakırköy Sahil
Location

Başakşehir-Metrokent is an underground rapid transit station on the M3 line of the Istanbul Metro. The station is located in central Başakşehir on Kanuni Sultan Süleyman Avenue and Deprem Konutları Road and is part of the MetroKent residential complex. The station has an island platform serviced by two tracks.

== Layout ==
Northbound	← toward Kayaşehir Merkez (Onurkent)
Island platform, doors will open on the left
Southbound	toward Bakırköy Sahil (Başak Konutları) →

== Operation information ==
The line operates between 06:00 and 00:00 and train frequency is 7 minutes at peak hours and 10 minutes at all other times. The line has no night service.

== Gallery ==
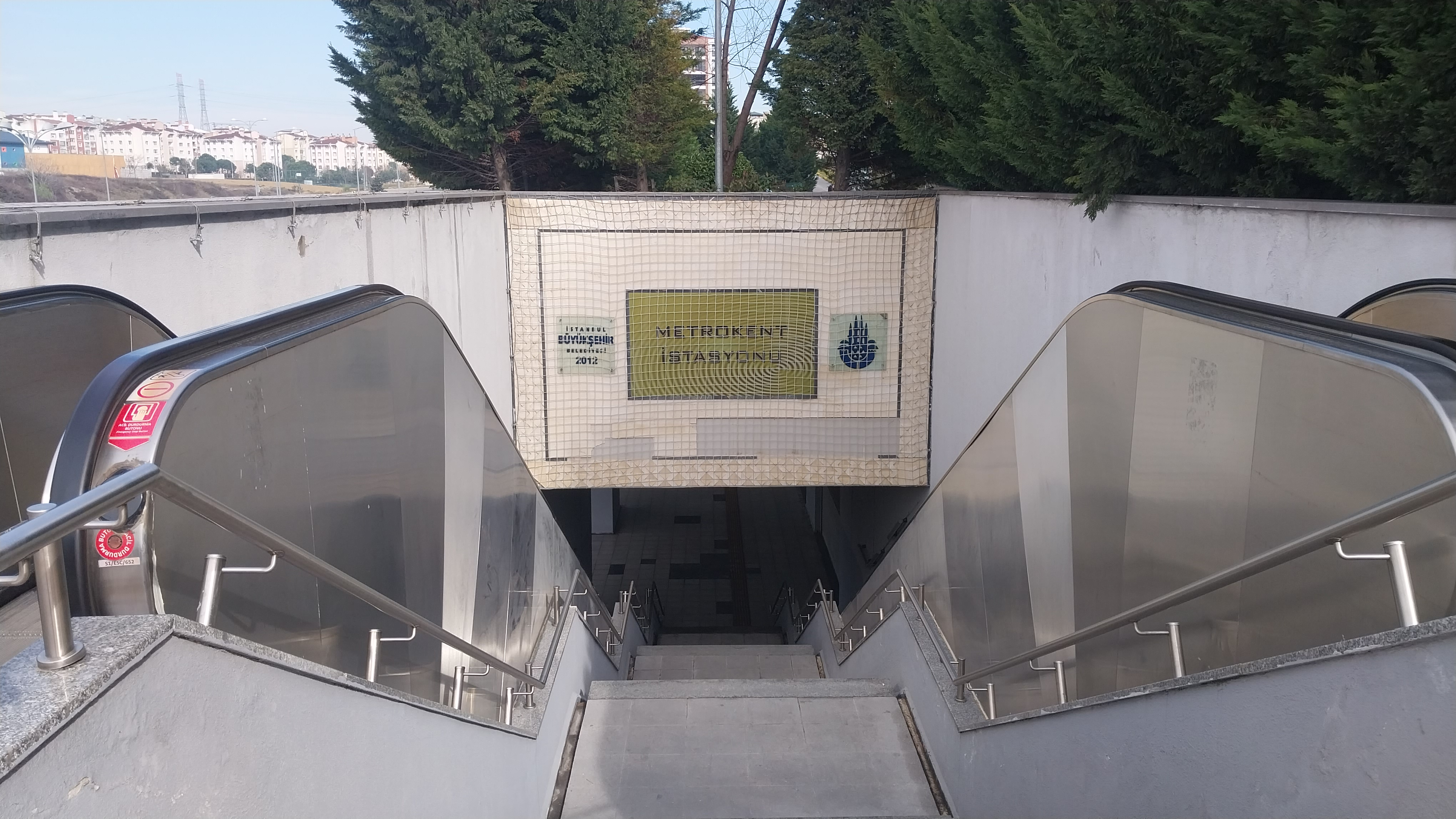
Entrance (Metrokent)

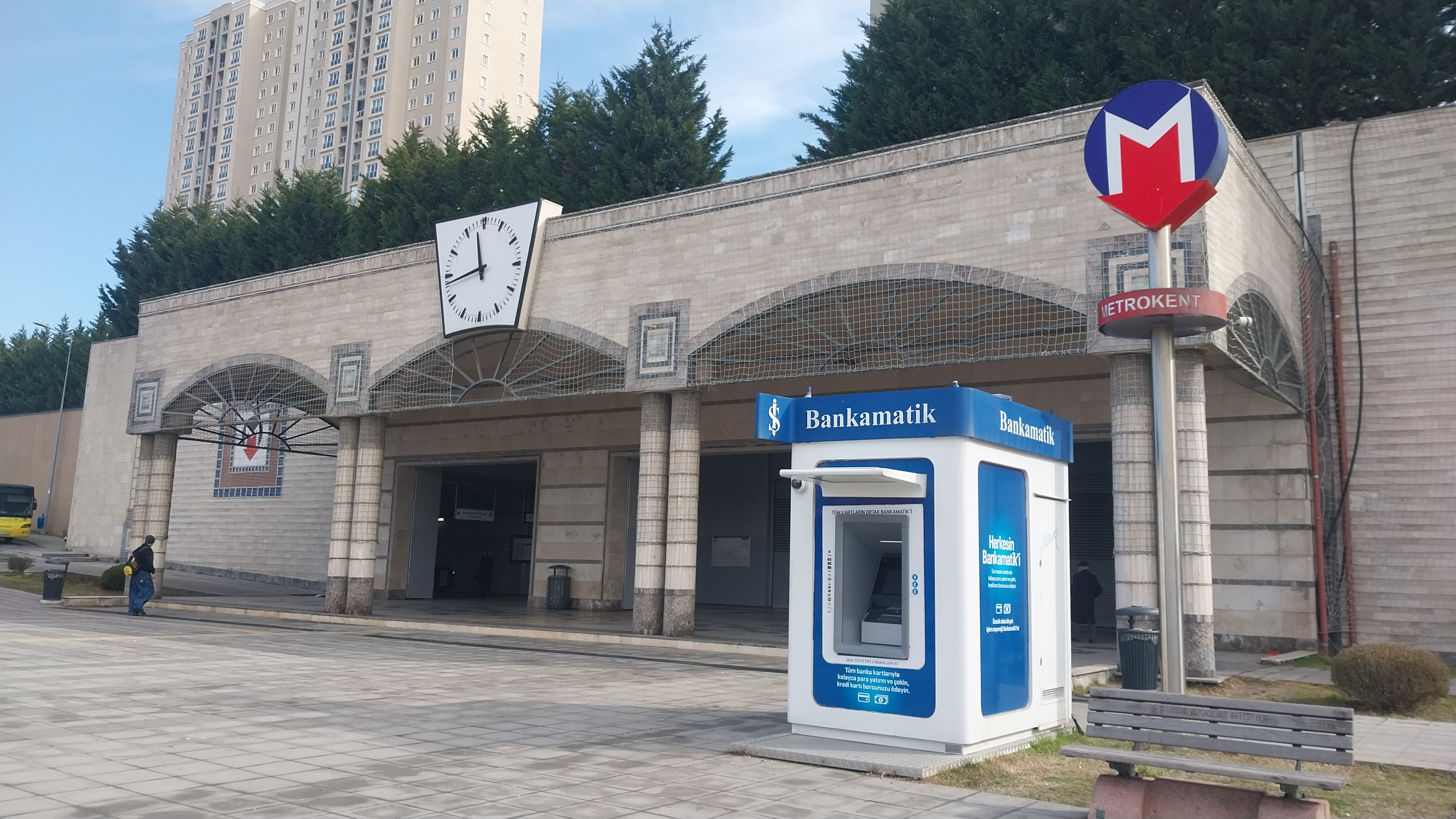
Entrance (Bus stops)

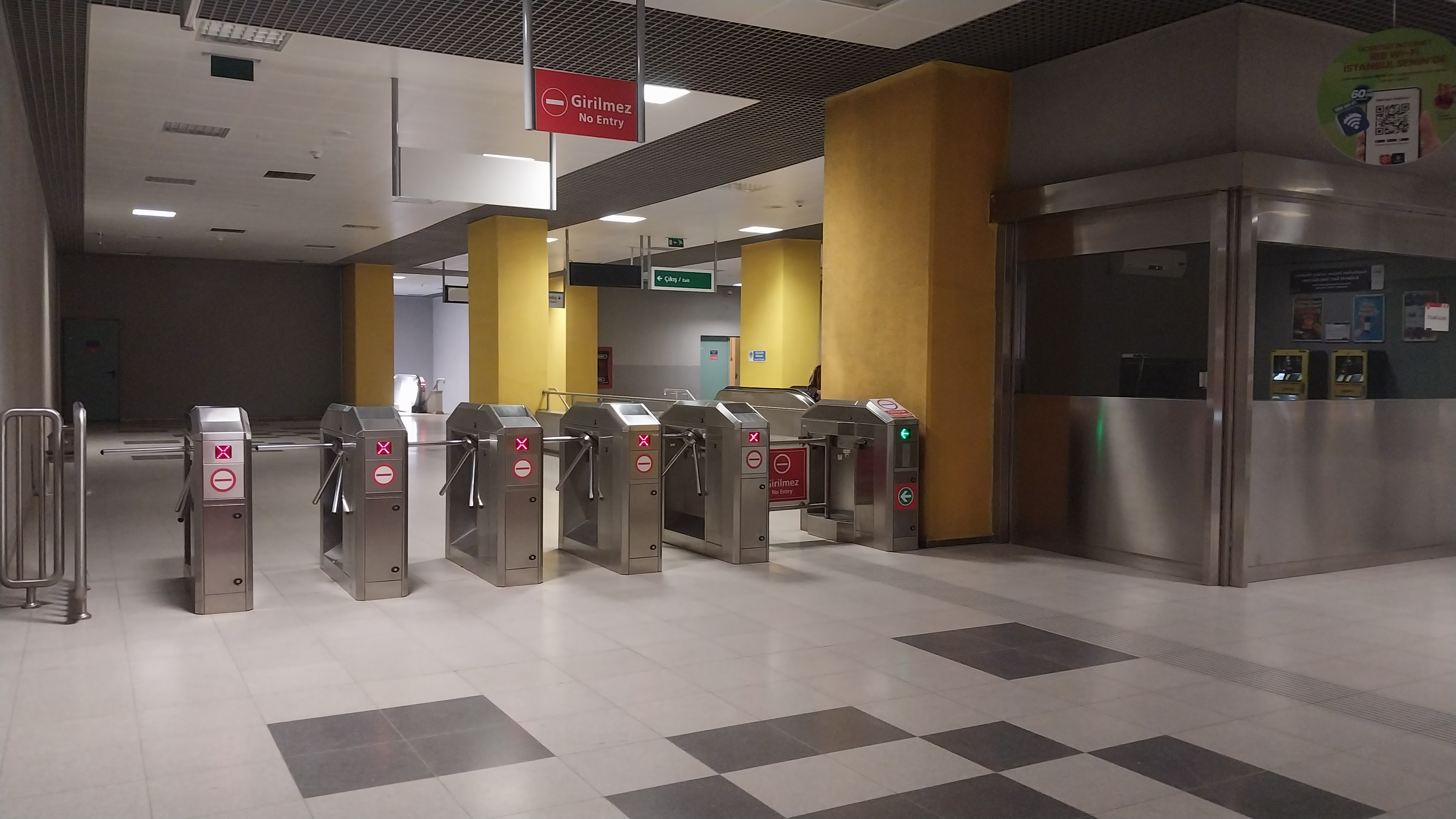
Ticket hall

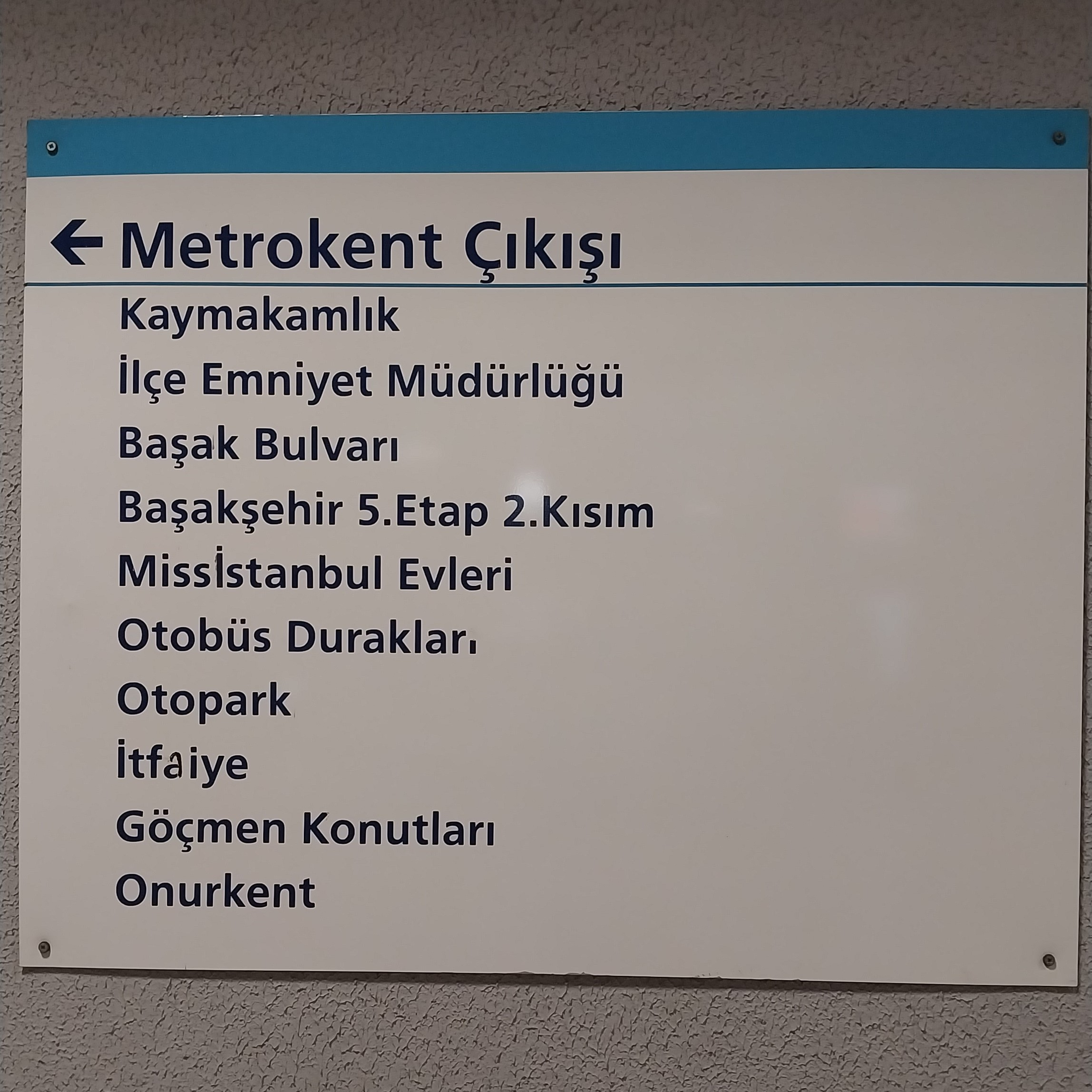
Exit sign

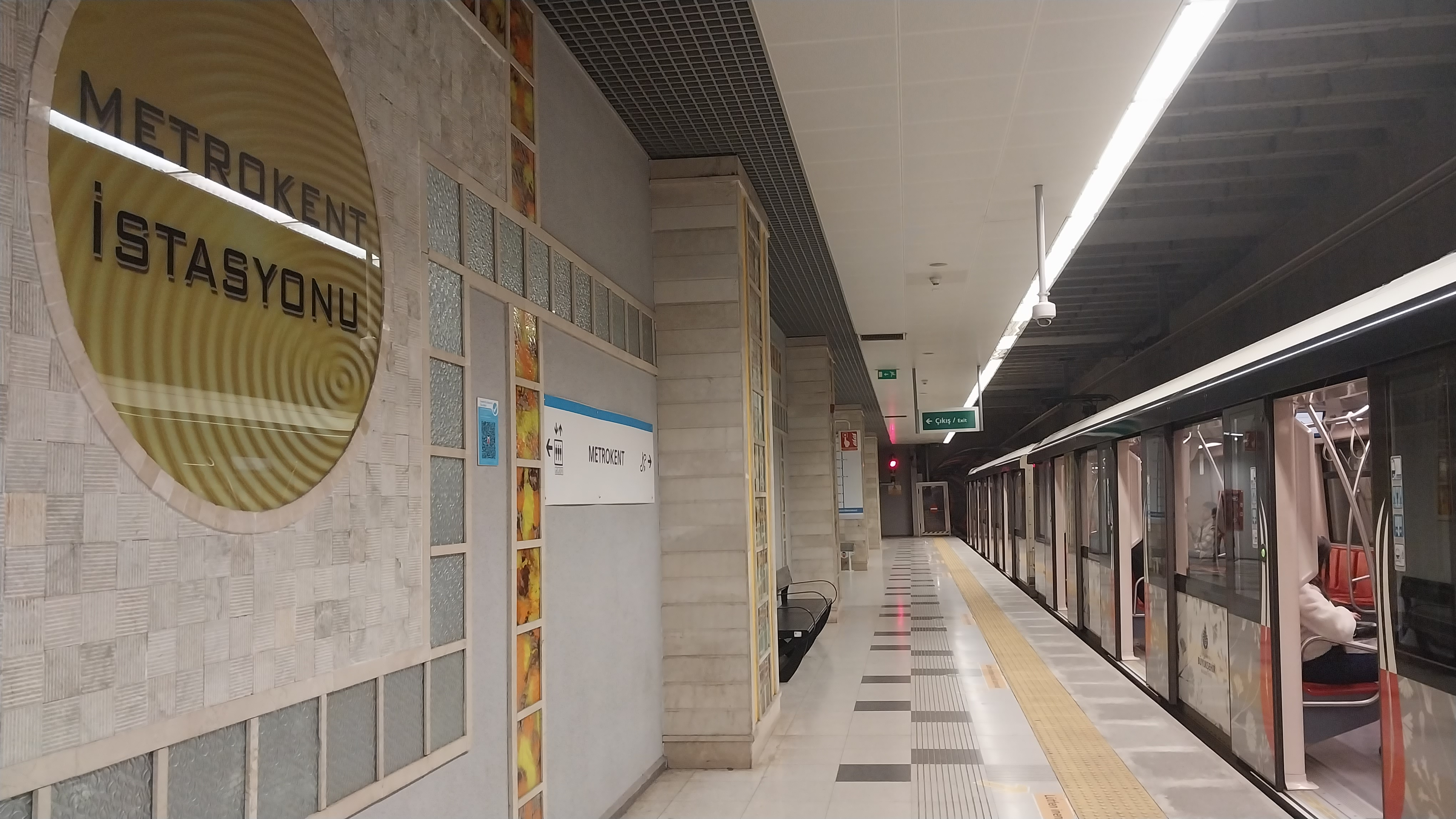
Platform
