= Turgut Özal station =

Station of the Istanbul Metro

Turgut Özal
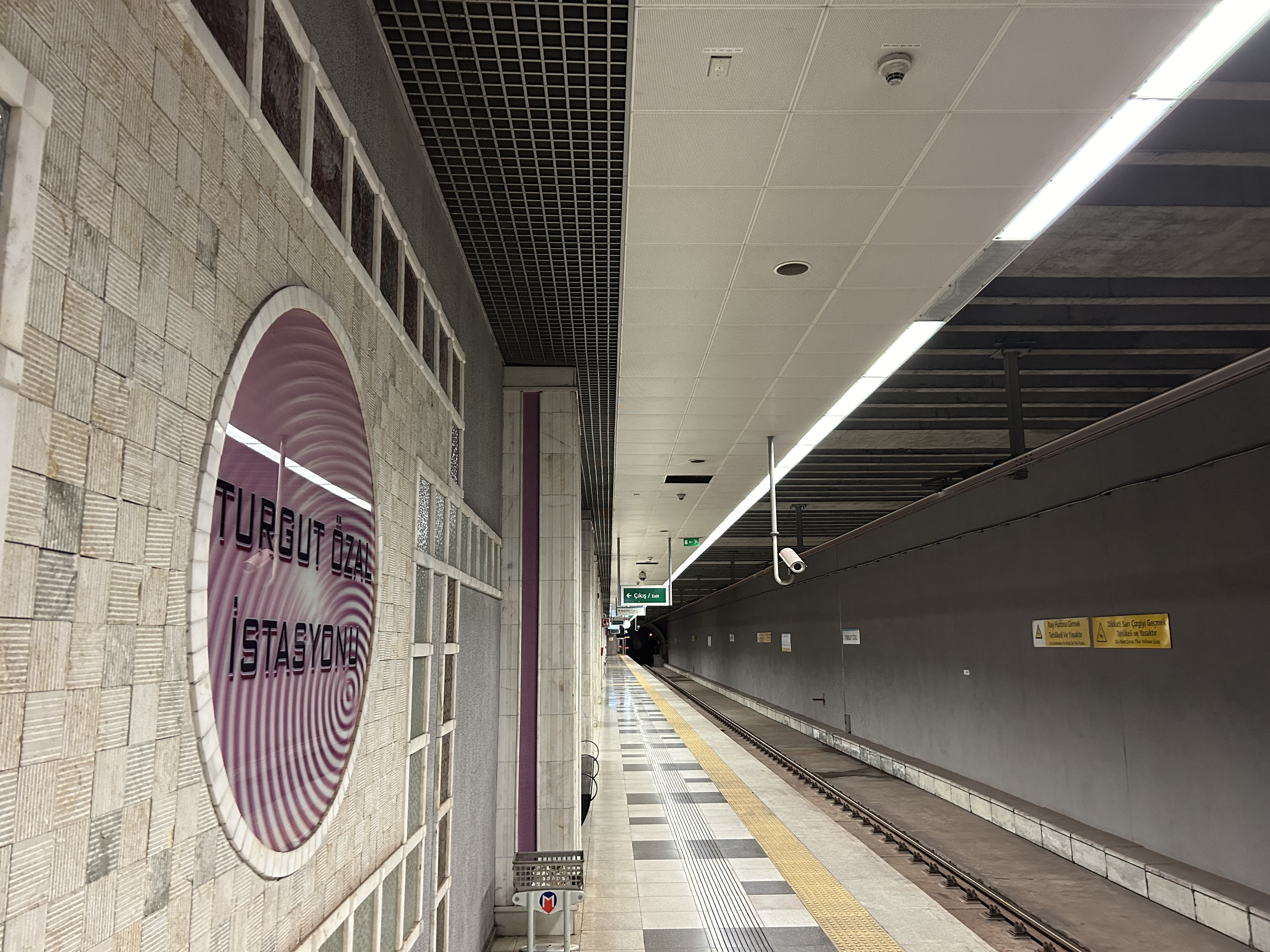
- Platform

General information
- Location: Başakşehir Neighborhood, Turgut Özal Street, 34480; Başakşehir, Istanbul; Turkey
- Coordinates: 41°4′51″N 28°47′51″E
- System: Istanbul Metro rapid transit station
- Owner: Istanbul Metropolitan Municipality
- Line: M3
- Platforms: 1 island platform
- Tracks: 2
- Connections: İETT Bus: 31Y, 78B, 78Ş, 82S, 98KM, 146K, 146M, MK31; Istanbul Minibus: Şirinevler-Kayaşehir

Construction
- Structure type: Underground
- Parking: No
- Cycle facilities: Yes
- Accessible: Yes

History
- Opened: 14 June 2013; 13 years ago
- Electrified: 1,500 V DC Overhead line

Services
Preceding station	Istanbul Metro	Following station
Siteler towards Kayaşehir Merkez	M3 Line	İkitelli Sanayi towards Bakırköy Sahil
Location

Turgut Özal is an underground rapid transit station on the M3 line of the Istanbul Metro. It is located in southern Başakşehir under Turgut Özal Boulevard. The station was named after Turgut Özal, the 8th President of Turkey. Turgut Özal was opened on 14 July 2013 and has an island platform serviced by two tracks.

Located in the Başakşehir neighborhood of Başakşehir, the station has three entrances: İpkas, Eskoop, and Triko Center. The station has 13 escalators and two elevators. The station's platform level, turnstile level, technical floors, and entrance were constructed using the cut-and-cover method.

== Layout ==
Northbound	← toward Kayaşehir Merkez (Siteler)
Island platform, doors will open on the left
Southbound	toward Bakırköy Sahil (İkitelli Sanayi) →

== Operation information ==
The line operates between 06:00 and 00:00 and train frequency is 7 minutes at peak hours and 10 minutes at all other times. The line has no night service.
