= Özgürlük Meydanı station =

Station of the Istanbul Metro

Özgürlük Meydanı
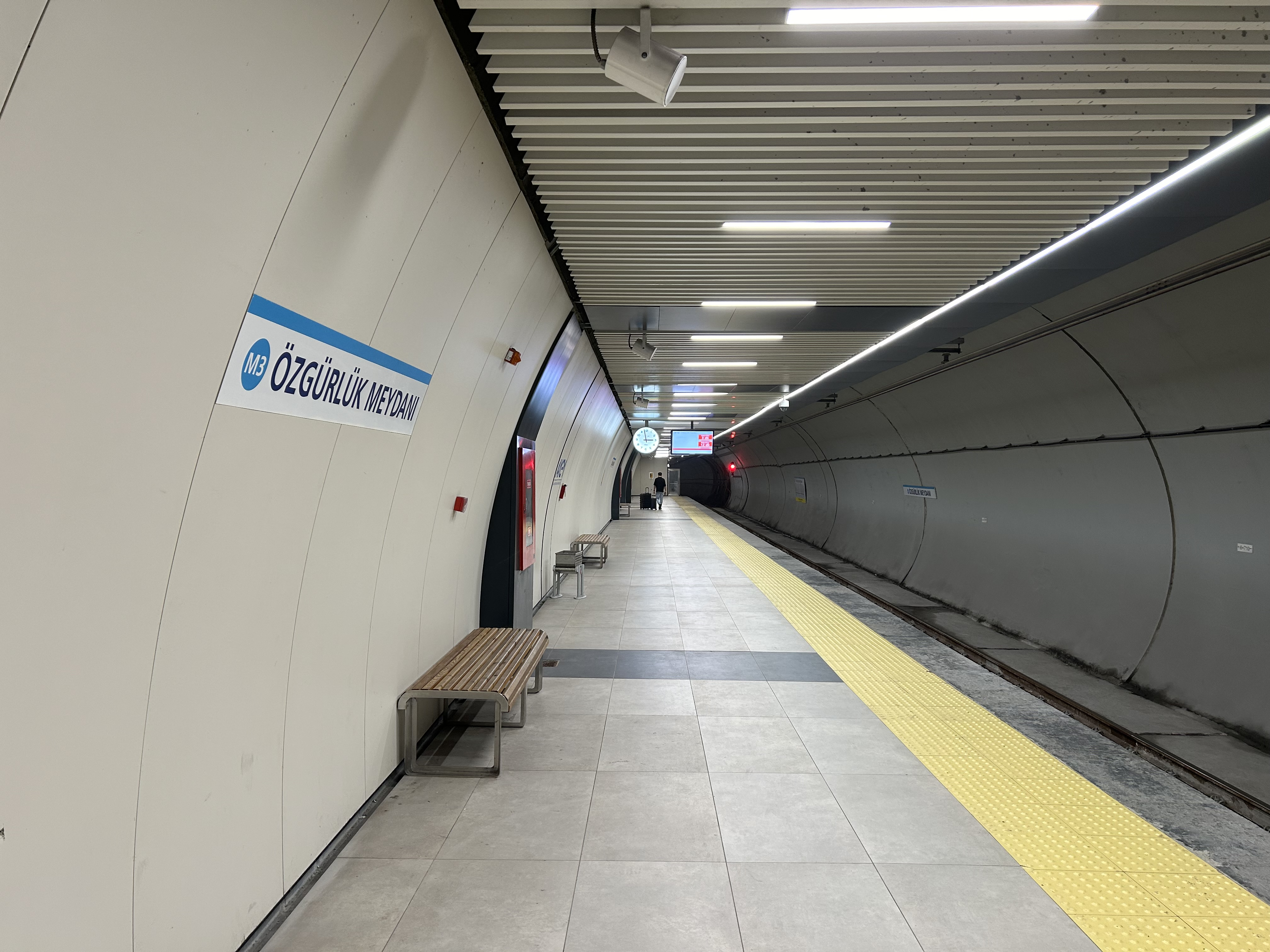
- Platform

General information
- Location: Kartaltepe Neighborhood, İncirli Street, Bakırköy Liberty Square, 34180; Bakırköy, Istanbul; Turkey
- Coordinates: 40°58′54″N 28°52′27″E
- System: Istanbul Metro rapid transit station
- Owner: Istanbul Metropolitan Municipality
- Line: M3
- Platforms: 1 Island platform
- Tracks: 2
- Connections: TCDD Taşımacılık: Marmaray and YHT at Bakırköy; İETT Bus: Bakırköy (131941): 50B, 73B, 76, 76B, 76C, 76V, 76Y, 79B, 89YB, 98, 98A, 98AB, 98B, 98D, 98E, 98G, 98H, 98K, 98M, 98MB, 98S, 98T, 98TB, 98Y, 146; Bakırköy (131943): 71T, 72T, 94A; Bakırköy (309431): E57; Istanbul Minibus: Bakırköy – Bakırköy Metro, Bakırköy – İkitelli, Bakırköy – İkitelli Köyiçi, Bakırköy – İSTOÇ, Bakırköy – Polis Lojmanları, Bakırköy – Soğanlı, Bakırköy – Yenibosna Metro, Bakırköy Metro – Barbaros Mahallesi, Bakırköy Metro – İSTOÇ, Bakırköy Metro – Ormantepe – Kocasinan Mahallesi, Bakırköy Metro – Yenibosna Metro, Bakırköy Metro – Yenimahalle Metro

Construction
- Structure type: Underground
- Parking: No
- Cycle facilities: Yes
- Accessible: Yes

History
- Opened: 10 March 2024 (2 years ago)
- Electrified: 1,500 V DC Overhead line

Services
Preceding station	Istanbul Metro	Following station
İncirli towards Kayaşehir Merkez	M3 Line	Bakırköy Sahil Terminus
Location

Özgürlük Meydanı is an underground station on the M3 line of the Istanbul Metro. It is located under İncirli Street at Bakırköy Liberty Square in the Kartaltepe neighborhood of Bakırköy. It was opened on 10 March 2024, with the opening of the M3 extension from Kirazlı to Bakırköy Sahil.

== Layout ==
Northbound	← toward Kayaşehir Merkez (İncirli)
Island platform, doors will open on the left
Southbound	toward Bakırköy Sahil (terminus) →

== Operation information ==
The line operates between 06:00 and 00:00 and train frequency is 7 minutes at peak hours and 10 minutes at all other times. The line has no night service.

== Gallery ==
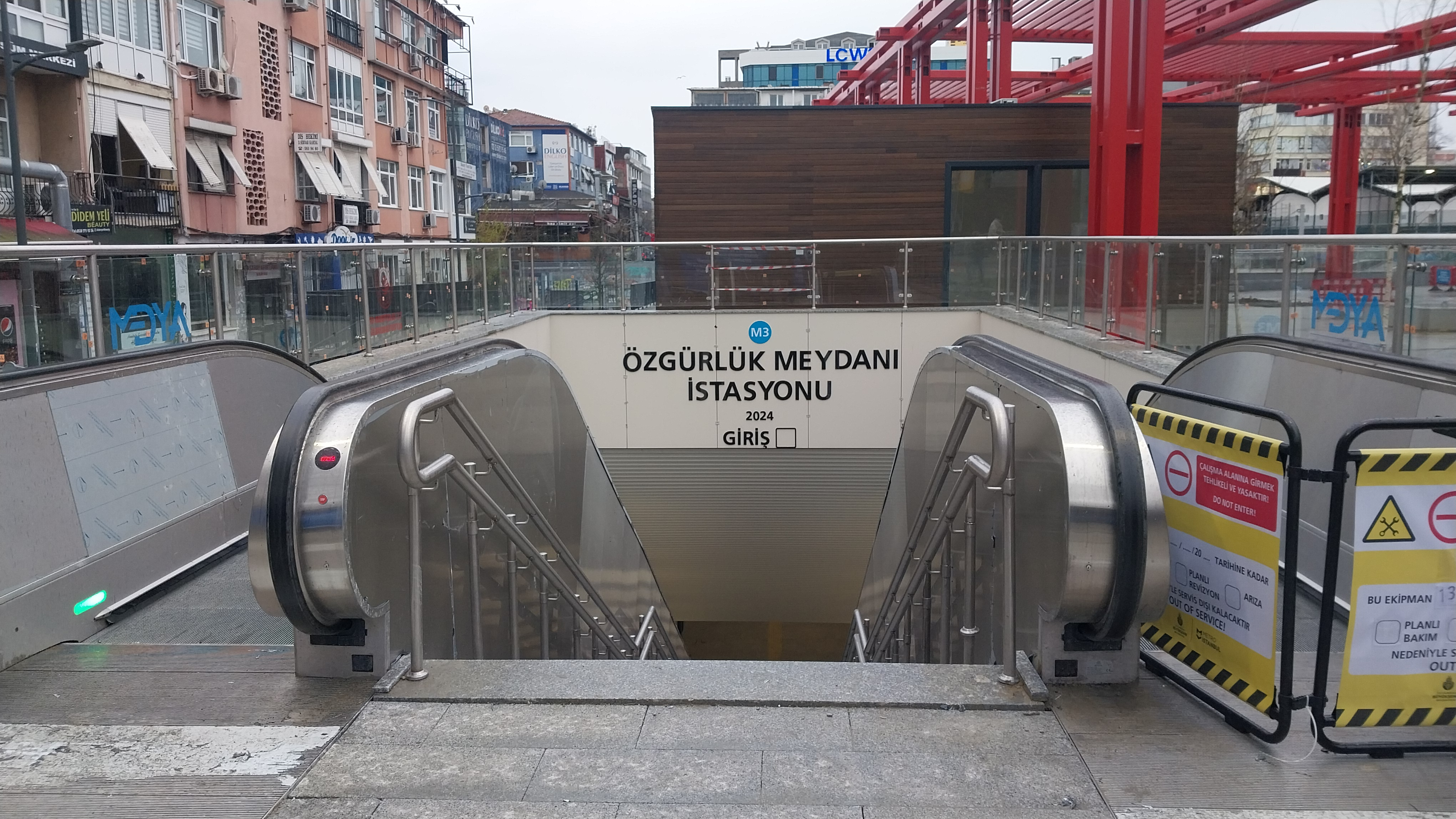
Entrance
