= M3 (Istanbul Metro) =

Rapid transit line of the Istanbul Metro system

M3 Bakırköy Sahil – Kayaşehir Merkez
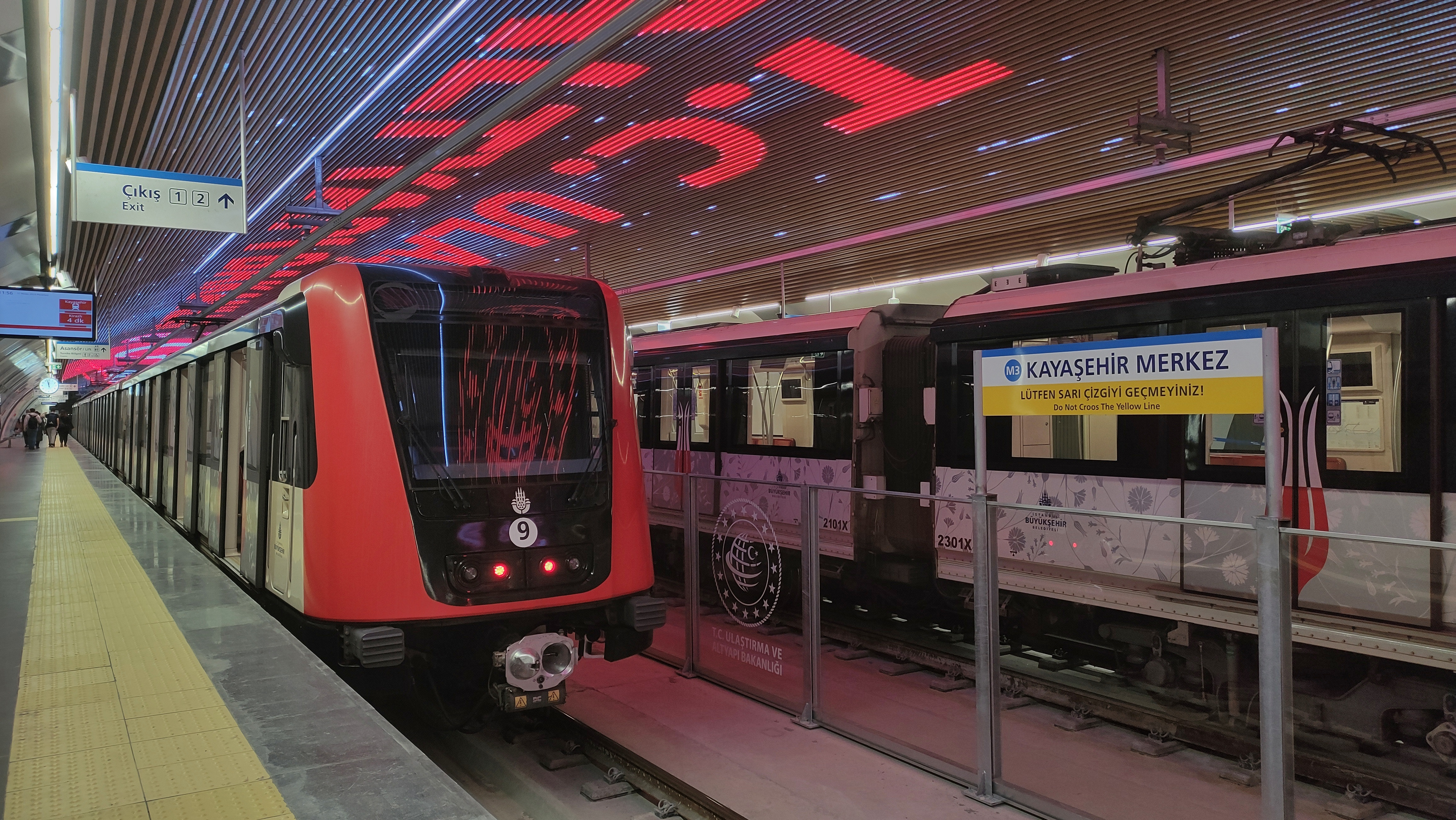
- Two M3 trains at Kayaşehir Merkez station, 2023

Overview
- Status: Operational
- Owner: Istanbul Metropolitan Municipality
- Line number: M3
- Locale: Istanbul, Turkey
- Termini: Bakırköy Sahil; Kayaşehir Merkez
- Stations: 20
- Website: M3

Service
- Type: Rapid transit
- System: Istanbul Metro
- Services: 1
- Operator: Metro Istanbul A.Ş.
- Depot: Olimpiyatköy
- Rolling stock: 80 Alstom Metropolis; 4 carriages per trainset

History
- Opened: 14 June 2013 (13 years ago)
- Last extension: 8 October 2025 (11 months ago) (Yıldıztepe Station)

Technical
- Line length: 26.7 km (16.6 mi)
- Number of tracks: 2
- Track gauge: 1,435 mm (4 ft 8 1/2 in) standard gauge
- Electrification: 1,500 V DC Overhead line
- Operating speed: 80 km/h (50 mph)

The M3, officially referred to as the M3 Bakırköy Sahil–Kayaşehir Merkez Metro Line (Turkish: M3 Bakırköy Sahil-Kayaşehir Merkez Metro Hattı), is a 26.7-kilometre (16.6 mi), 20-station rapid transit line of the Istanbul Metro system on the European part of Istanbul, Turkey. It operates between Bakırköy Sahil and Kayaşehir Merkez. The line is colored light blue on station signs, route signs and the official rapid transit network map.

== Construction ==
The construction of the line began in 2006 following the signing of the related contract in May of that year. By March 2009, the tunnels were completed. The first train for the line was delivered on 29 October 2008, and in December 2010, the first test run of the trains was accomplished. The line's operation rights were transferred from the İETT bus authority to İstanbul Ulaşım (now Metro İstanbul) in June 2011. After the line's signalization system was completely installed in March 2012, test runs began in June 2012. The line started operating unofficially from Kirazlı to Metrokent on 10 September 2012, and officially entered service on 14 June 2013. The branch line to Olimpiyat later opened on 22 November 2013. The Ikitelli-Olimpiyat branch was transferred to the M9 in May 29, 2021. The northern extension to Kayaşehir Merkez was opened on 8 April 2023, while the southern section from Kirazlı to Bakırköy Sahil was inaugurated on 10 March 2024. Yıldıztepe station, on the section between Kirazlı and Bakırköy Sahil, opened on 8 October 2025.

Özgürlük Meydanı, Haznedar, İlkyuva, Onurkent, Toplu Konutlar and Kayaşehir Merkez stations are bored in situ without removing the ground above, while all other underground stations on the line are built by cut-and-cover method, constructed in a shallow trench and then covered over. The line's tunnels are twin tubes. The Kirazlı-Metrokent and Kirazlı-Bakırköy Sahil sections was constructed by tunnel boring machine (TBM).

=== Opening timeline ===
Stage	Segment	Opening date	Length	Station(s)
1	Kirazlı – Başakşehir-Metrokent	14 June 2013	12.1 km (7.52 mi)	9
1	İkitelli Sanayi – Olimpiyat	22 November 2013	3.8 km (2.36 mi)	3
1	İkitelli Sanayi – Olimpiyat	29 March 2021 (transferred to M9)	−3.8 km (−2.36 mi)	-3
2	Başakşehir-Metrokent – Kayaşehir Merkez	8 April 2023	6.2 km (3.85 mi)	4
3	Kirazlı – Bakırköy Sahil	10 March 2024	8.4 km (5.22 mi)	6
3	Yıldıztepe	8 October 2025	–	1

== Technical features ==
The M3 line is 26.7 kilometres (16.6 mi) long, serving 20 stations in total. The operation control center of the M3-line is situated in MetroKent. The rolling stock and maintenance depots are located in Olimpiyatköy beyond Olimpiyat Parkı Terminal, stretching over an area of (70,000 m^{2} (750,000 sq ft)). The rolling stock depot is capable of holding 180 cars. The maintenance workshop occupies a covered area of 10,000 m^{2} (110,000 sq ft).

The rolling stock was delivered by the French company Alstom. The fully air-conditioned cars, costing each €1.149 million, feature seats covered with antibacterial textile material. It is possible to pass from one car to another in a train to enable a homogeneous distribution of the passenger crowd.

A total of 80 cars, 20 sets of four-car trains, are able to transport up to 70,000 passenger per hour per direction between the operating hours from 6:00 h in the early morning to 0:00 h in the midnight. The ride between the terminals Bakırköy Sahil and Kayaşehir Merkez takes 39 minutes. The trains run every five minutes during rush hours.

== Safety ==
All the stations are equipped with closed-circuit video system for continuous monitoring of the platforms. High-level fire safety systems, which include automatic fire extinguishers and fire exits, are installed in the metro line, where non-flammable and fireproofing materials were used.

Power supply of the line is provided at two different points. In case of power cut at both supply points, an emergency power system that becomes operational within 15 seconds, ensures running of the trains until the next station. If the backup generator system fails, an uninterruptible power source (UPS) supplies energy for emergency lighting and the electronic devices at the operations control center up to three hours. The signalization of the metro line as well as at the depots and railroad switches, also the vehicle drive-control systems are fully automated. However, they can be handled manually when needed.

== Stations ==
All stations are underground.

M3 route diagram

No	Station	District	Transfer	Notes
1	Bakırköy Sahil	Bakırköy	(Bakırköy Terminal)	Rauf Orbay Av・Ataköy Marina・Galleria・Kennedy Av
2	Özgürlük Meydanı	Bakırköy	・ (Bakırköy railway station); İETT Bus: 50B, 71T, 72T, 94A 73B, 76, 76B, 76C, 76V, 76Y, 79B, 89YB, 98, 98A, 98AB, 98B, 98D, 98E, 98G, 98H, 98K, 98M, 98MB, 98S, 98T, 98TB, 98Y, 146, E-57	Bakırköy Özgürlük Square・İncirli Av・Yusuf Köksal Park・Bakırköy Anadolu Imam Hatip High School
3	İncirli	Bakırköy	・ (planned)・ İETT Bus: 31, 31E, 50B, 71T, 72T, 73, 73F, 76D, 78ZB, 79G, 79Ş, 82, 89, 89A, 89B, 89K, 89M, 89S, 92, 94Y, 97, 97A, 97BT, 97E, 97KZ, 97T, H-9, HT13, MK97	Hatice Küçük Park・Bakırköy District Court・İsmail Erak Boulevard・Botanik Park
4	Haznedar	Güngören	İETT Bus: 36CY, 92, 97T, 98D, 98G, 98Y, MK97	Güngören Park・Naci Kazım Av・Naci Kazım Park
5	İlkyuva	Bahçelievler	İETT Bus: 36CY, 92, 98D, 98Y	Bağcılar Avenue・Bahçelievler İSKİ Building
6	Yıldıztepe	Bağcılar	İETT Bus: 36CY, 92, 98D, 98S, 98Y	Bağcılar Av・Kıbrıs Av・Bağcılar Anadolu High School・Bağcılar Yıldıztepe Primary School・Hoca Ahmet Yesevi Middle School
7	Molla Gürani	Bağcılar	İETT Bus: 98K, HT10, HT11	Molla Gürani Park・Mehmet Akif Boulevard・Yıldıztepe Park
8	Kirazlı	Bağcılar	・ (planned); İETT Bus: 92K, 98K, HT10, MK42	Hoca Ahmet Yesevi Avenue・Mevlana Avenue・Atlas University Hospital
9	Yenimahalle	Bağcılar	İETT Bus: 92, 92B, 92K, 92Ş, 97G, 98D, 98K, HT13	15 Temmuz Şehit Ramazan Sarıkaya Park・Dökumcüler Avenue
10	Mahmutbey	Bağcılar	İETT Bus: 141K, 141M, 144M, 89C, 89T, 91E, 97E, 97GE, 97M, 98A, 98M, H-1, HT10	Maslak Avenue・İnönü Avenue・Bosna Avenue
11	İSTOÇ	Bağcılar	İETT Bus: 143, 146B, 146K, 146M, 31Y, 76O, 78, 89F, 98M	İSTOÇ
12	İkitelli Sanayi	Başakşehir	İETT Bus: 31Y, 82S MK31	free transfer
13	Turgut Özal	Başakşehir	İETT Bus: 31Y, 78B, 78Ş, 82S, 98KM, 146K, 146M, MK31	Industrial Districts・Süleyman Demirel Boulevard
14	Siteler	Başakşehir	İETT Bus: 143, 146B, 146K, 146M, 78C, 79E, 82S, 98KM	Atatürk Boulevard
15	Başak Konutları	Başakşehir	İETT Bus: 78ZB, 89C, 98, 98KM, 143	Prof.Dr Necmettin Erbakan Street・Başakşehir 1.Etap Yürüyüş Yolu Park
16	Başakşehir-Metrokent	Başakşehir	Havaist Bus Transfer; İETT Bus: 78, 78BE, 78F, 89C, 98H, 98KM, 146B, MK1, MK22	Metrokent Residences
17	Onurkent	Başakşehir	İETT Bus: 78E, 78F, 78ZB, 89C, 98, 146B, 146K	Onurkent Park・Mimar Kemalettin Street・Akif İnan Anadolu İmam Hatip High School
18	Şehir Hastanesi	Başakşehir	İETT Bus: 36F, 78E, 78F, 78Ş, 79B, 79E, 79F, 79FY, 79GE, 79KM, 79KT, 79T, 146BA, 146F, HS1, HS2, MK1, MK2, MK22, MR50	Başakşehir Çam and Sakura City Hospital
19	Toplu Konutlar	Başakşehir	İETT Bus: 36AS, 78E,78G, 78Ş, 79B, 79C, 79E, 79F, 79G, 79K, 79KM, 79KT, 79T, 79Y, MK11	Kayaşehir Boulevard・Kayaşehir City Park
20	Kayaşehir Merkez	Başakşehir	(Kayaşehir); İETT Bus: 36F, 78F, 79F, 79FY, 79GE, 79KM, 79KT, MK22	Kayaşehir Boulevard・Başakşehir City Park・Kayaşehir Square・Başakşehir Central Mosque

== Rolling stock ==
This line is operated with 20 four-car Alstom trains which are visually similar to the AM5-M2 and AM4-M4 trains also built by Alstom that operate on the Budapest Metro. The main difference is that the Istanbul units are equipped with pantographs for overhead line operation only, while the Budapest units are equipped with shoegear for third rail operation only. Since its opening in 2021, the fleet has also been used on the M9 line.

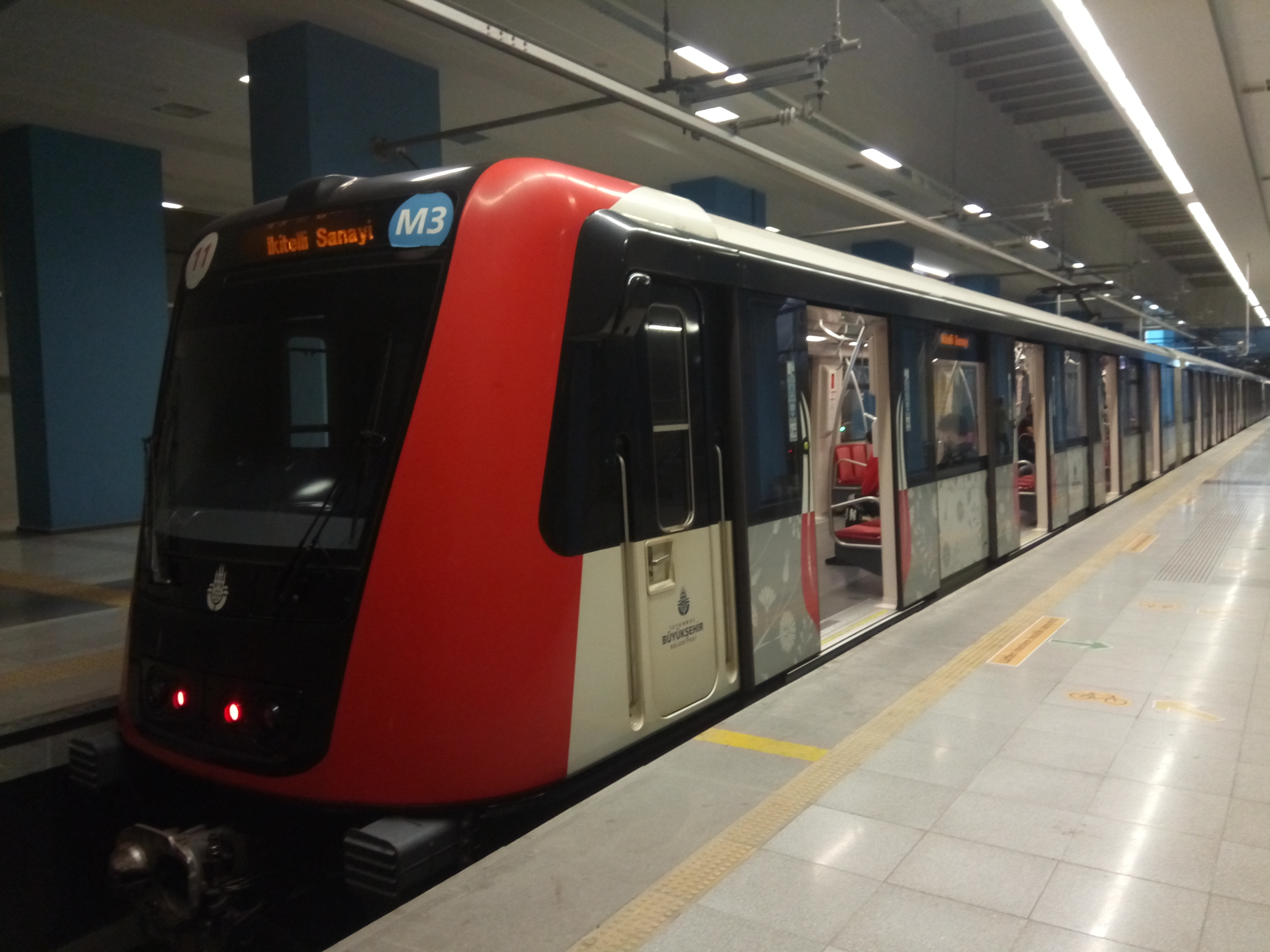
An M3 train at İkitelli Sanayi station, 2020

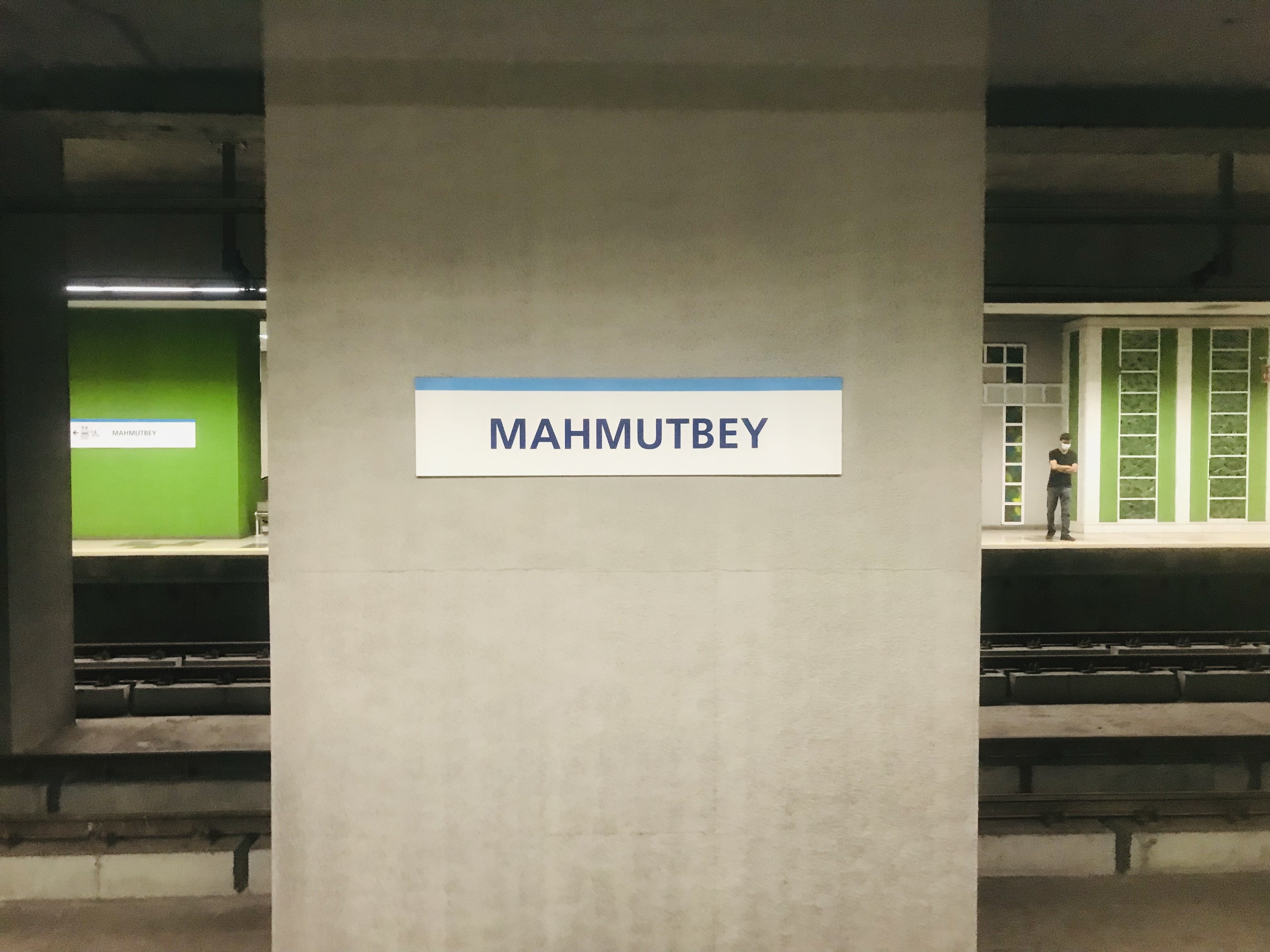
Mahmutbey station, 2021

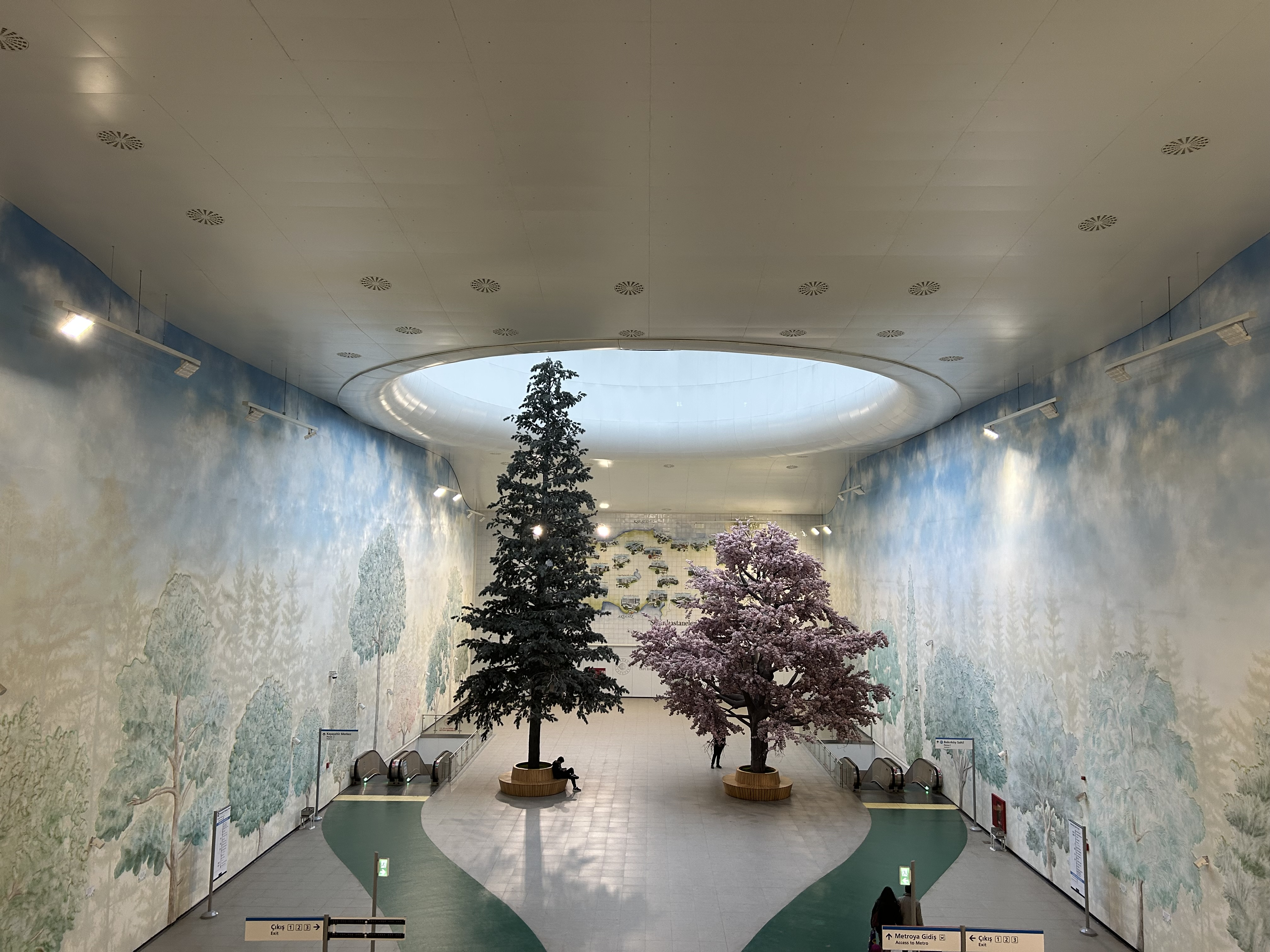
Şehir Hastanesi station, 2024

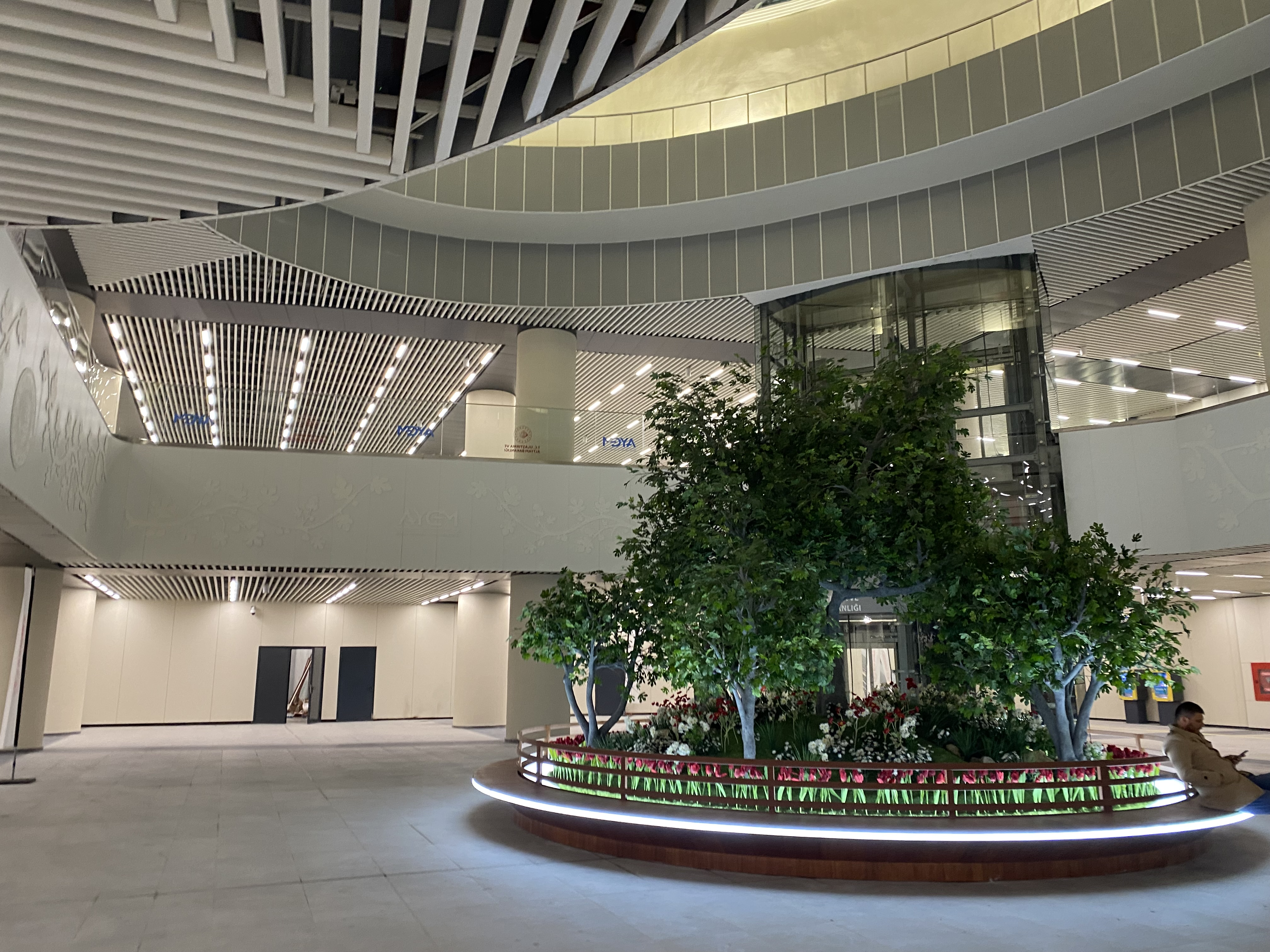
İncirli station, 2024

== See also ==
- Istanbul modern tramways
- Istanbul nostalgic tramways
- Marmaray
- Public transport in Istanbul
