= Bakırköy Sahil station =

Station of the Istanbul Metro

Bakırköy Sahil
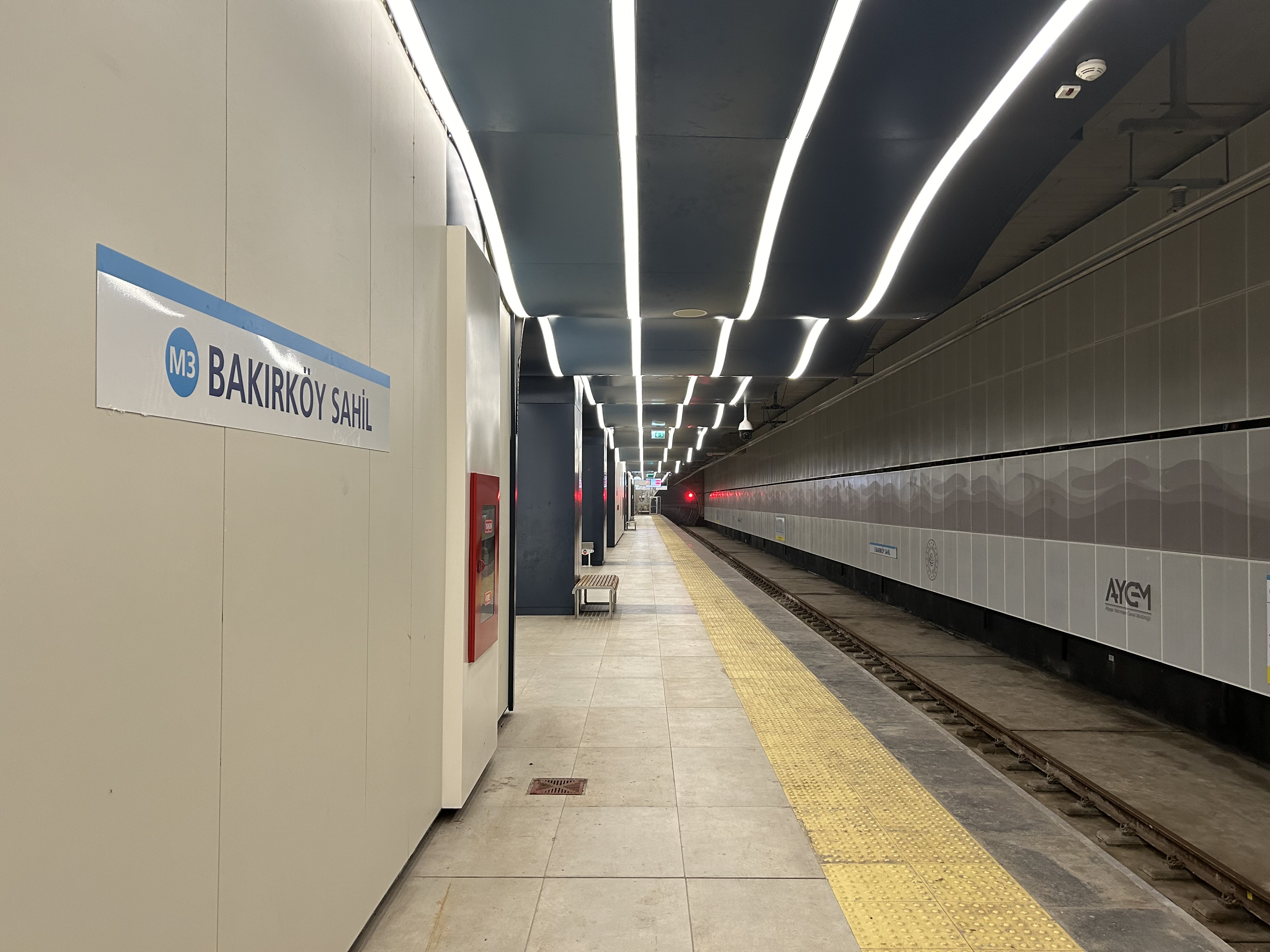
- Platform

General information
- Location: Ataköy 1. kısım Neighborhood, Galleria Inner Road, Galleria Ataköy, 34158; Bakırköy, Istanbul; Turkey
- Coordinates: 40°58′25″N 28°52′4″E
- System: Istanbul Metro rapid transit station
- Owner: Istanbul Metropolitan Municipality
- Line: M3
- Platforms: 1 Island platform
- Tracks: 2
- Connections: İDO at Bakırköy Ferry Terminal; Istanbul Minibus: Bakırköy – Soğanlı, Kemalpaşa – Şirinevler; Istanbul Dolmus: Taksim – Yeşilköy, Taksim – Florya, Taksim – Yenibosna

Construction
- Structure type: Underground
- Parking: No
- Cycle facilities: Yes
- Accessible: Yes

History
- Opened: 10 March 2024 (2 years ago)
- Electrified: 1,500 V DC Overhead line

Services
Preceding station	Istanbul Metro	Following station
Özgürlük Meydanı towards Kayaşehir Merkez	M3 Line	Terminus
Location

Bakırköy Sahil is an underground station on the M3 line of the Istanbul Metro. It is located under Galleria Inner Road at Galleria Ataköy in the Ataköy 1. kısım neighborhood of Bakırköy. It was opened on 10 March 2024, with the opening of the M3 extension from Kirazlı, and is the southern terminus of the line.

== Layout ==
Northbound	← toward Kayaşehir Merkez (Özgürlük Meydanı)
Island platform, doors will open on the left or right
Northbound	← toward Kayaşehir Merkez (Özgürlük Meydanı)

== Operation information ==
The line operates between 06:00 and 00:00 and train frequency is 7 minutes at peak hours and 10 minutes at all other times. The line has no night service.

== Gallery ==
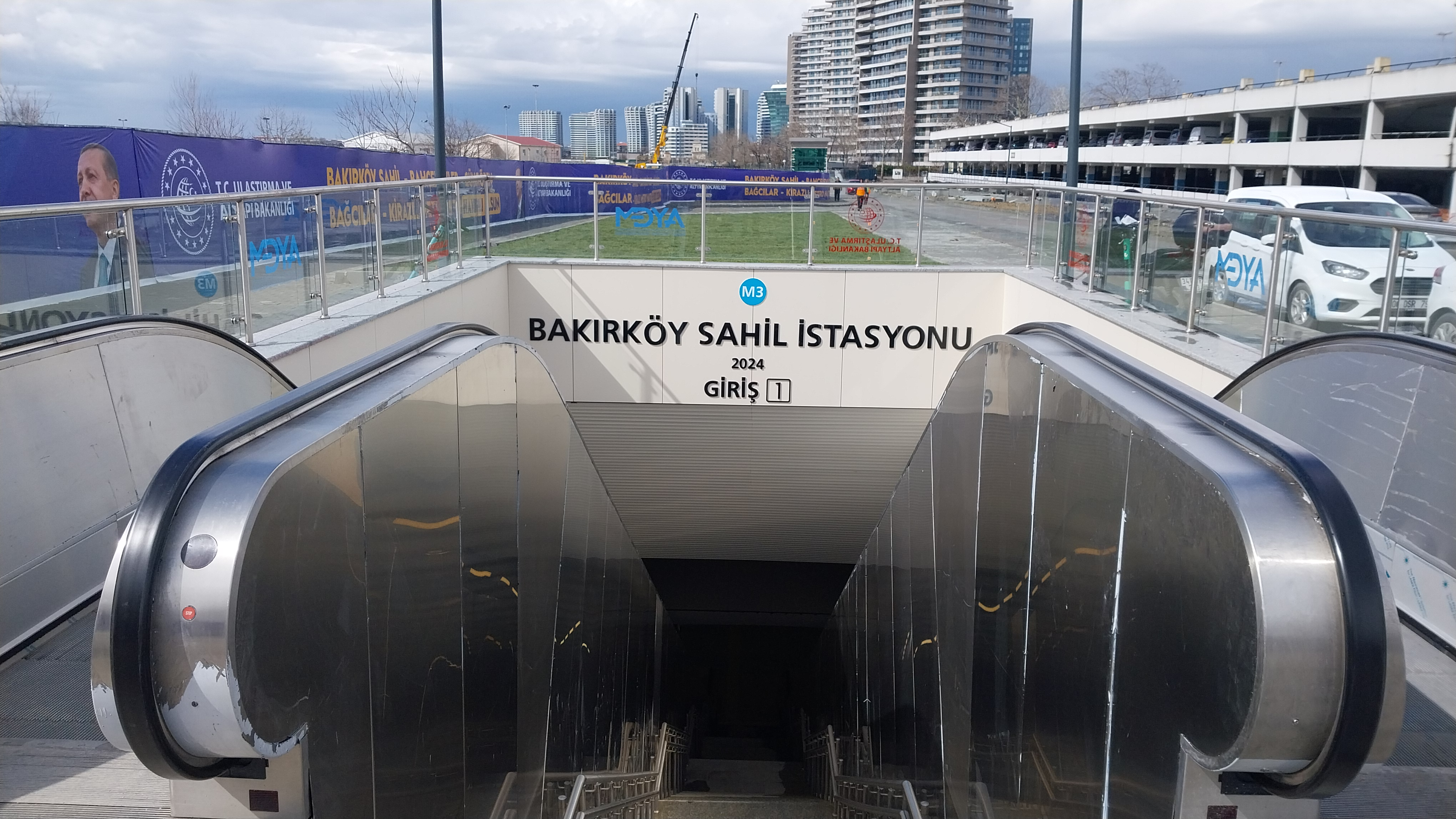
Entrance 1

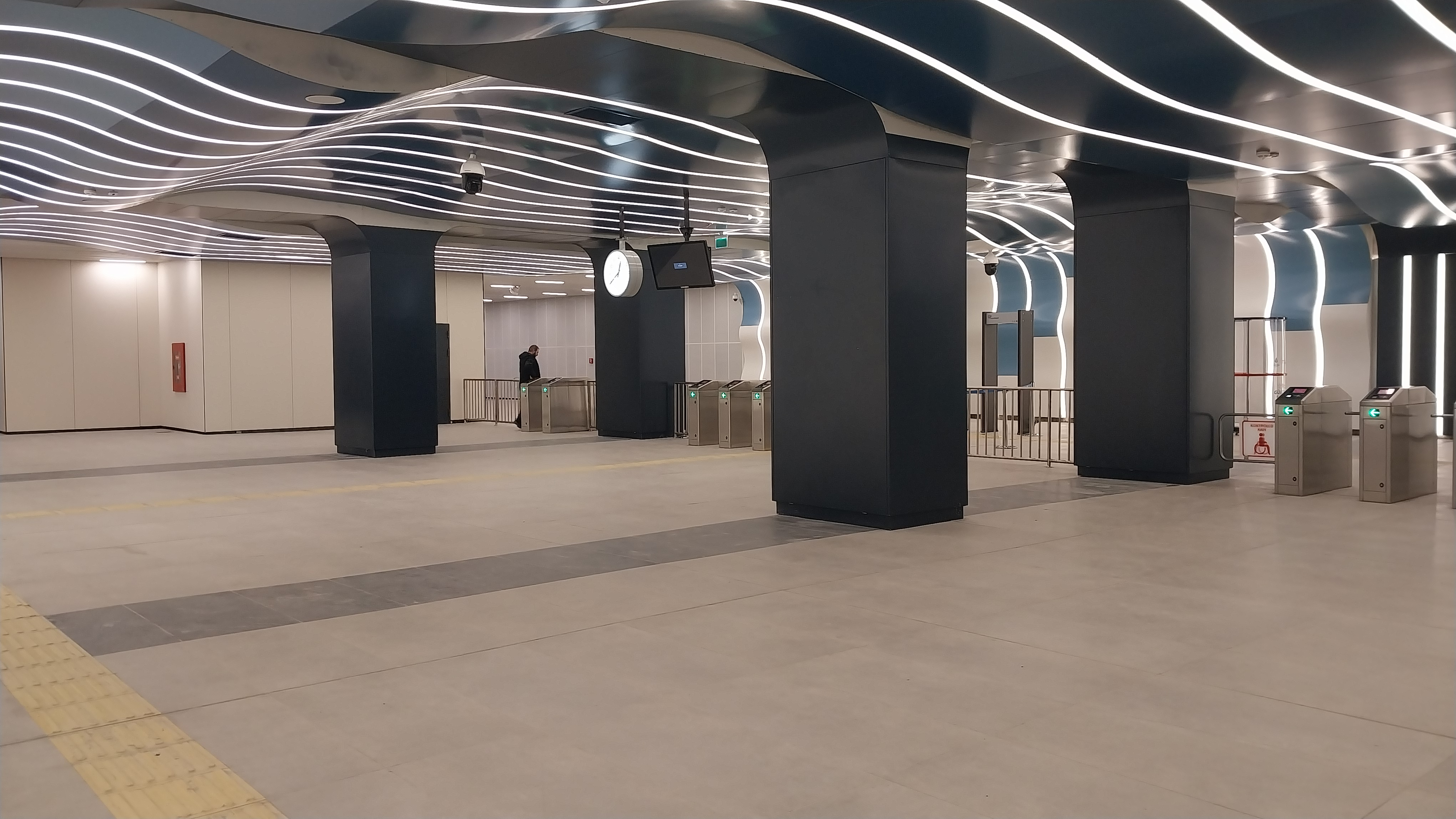
Ticket hall

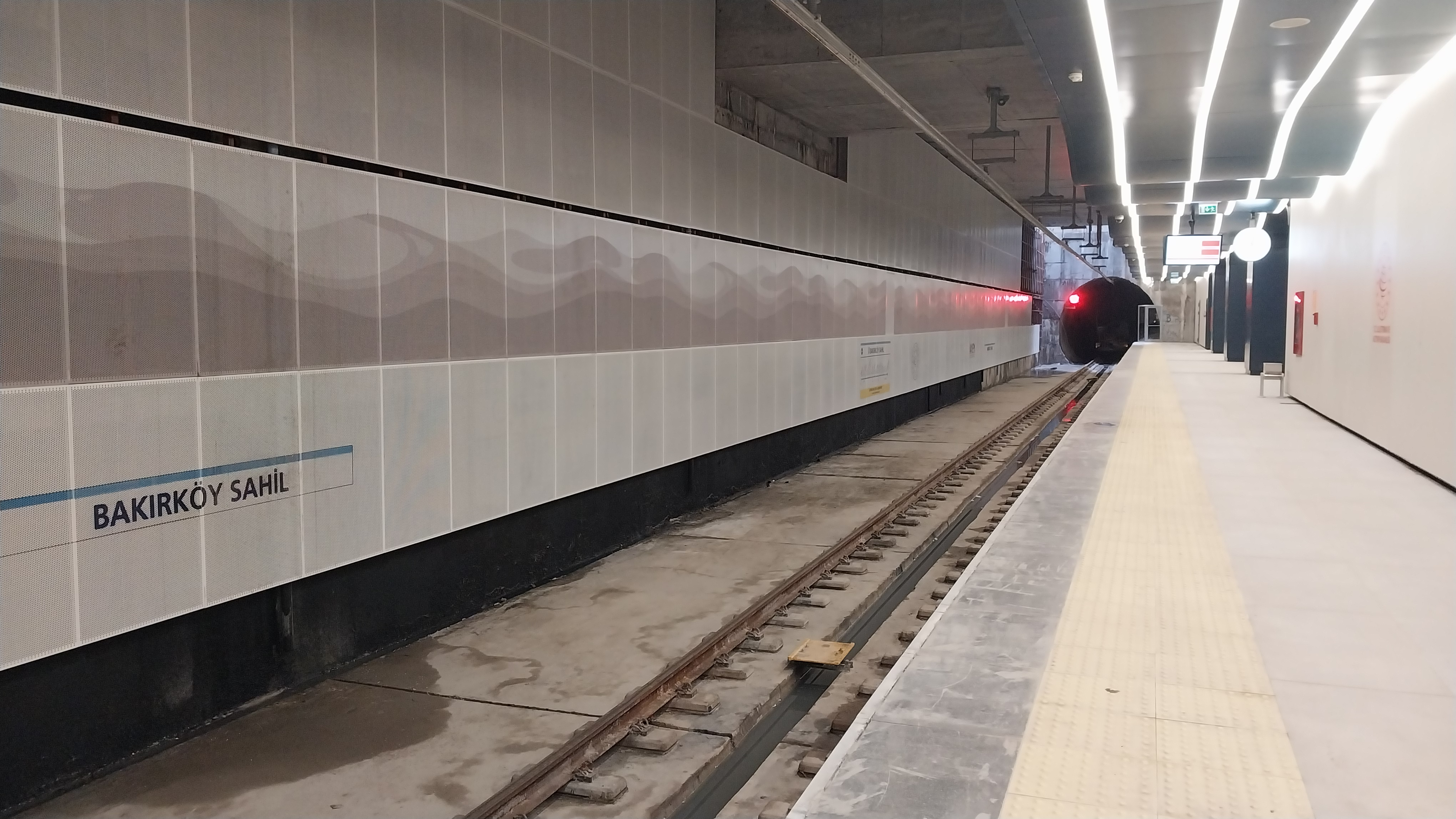
Platform
