= Davutpaşa–YTÜ station =

Station of the Istanbul Metro

Davutpaşa–YTÜ
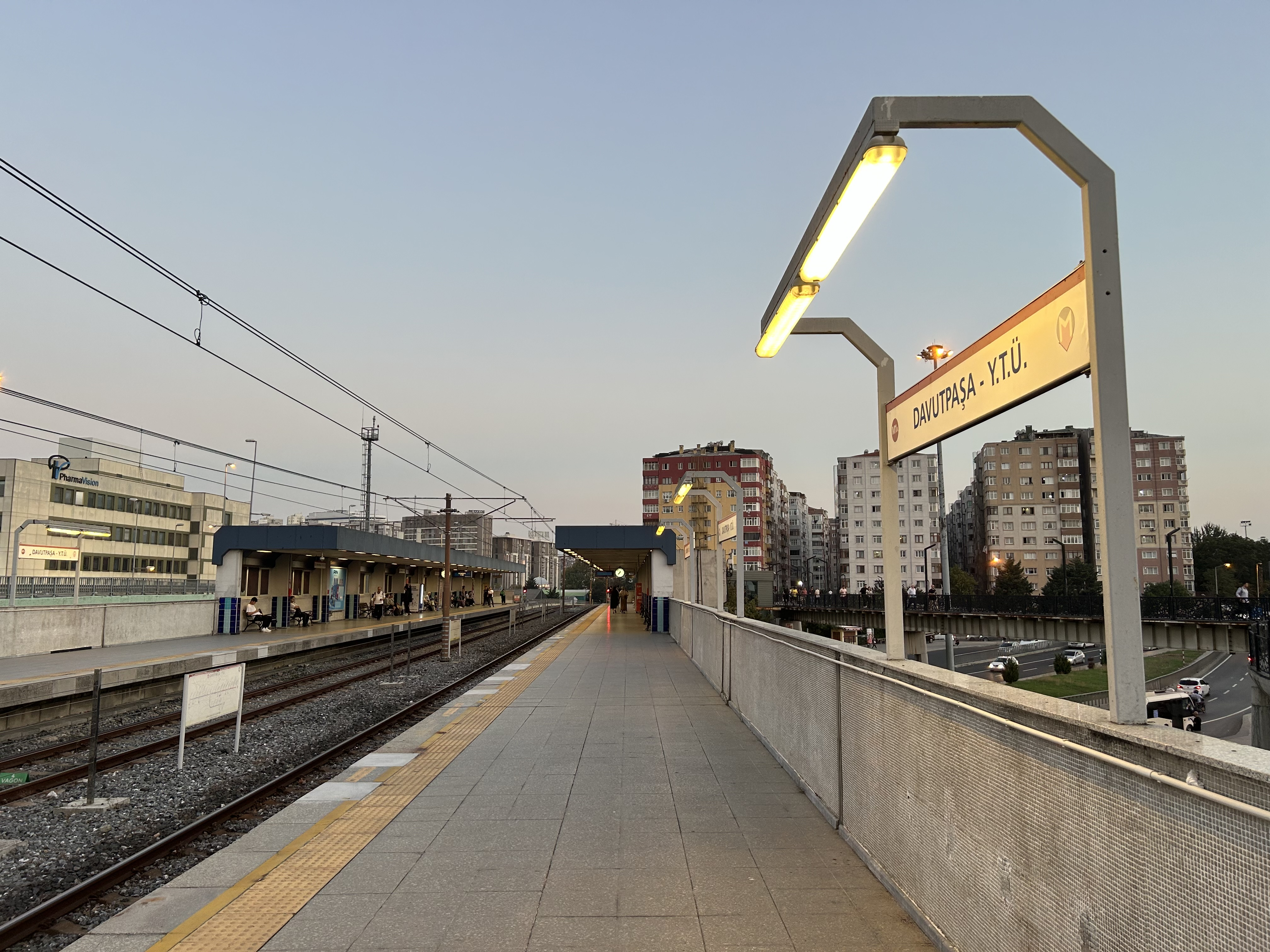
- Platform (towards Atatürk Airport)

General information
- Location: Tozkoparan Neighborhood, Dumlupınar Street, 34173; Güngören, Istanbul; Turkey
- Coordinates: 41°1′13″N 28°54′1″E
- System: Istanbul Metro rapid transit station
- Owner: Istanbul Metropolitan Municipality
- Line: M1A
- Platforms: 2 side platforms
- Tracks: 2
- Connections: İETT Bus: 33B, 41AT, 85C, 92B, 92C; Istanbul Minibus: Eyüpsultan-Otogar-Davutpaşa, Evren Mahallesi-Otocenter, Topkapı-Starcity, Topkapı-Otocenter, Topkapı-Bağcılar-Giyimkent, Topkapı-Bağcılar-Yüzyıl Mahallesi, Topkapı-Çavuşpaşa, Topkapı-İstoç, Topkapı-İkitelli, Topkapı-Bakırköy

Construction
- Structure type: At-grade
- Accessible: Yes

History
- Opened: 31 January 1994; 32 years ago
- Electrified: 750 V DC Overhead line

Services
Preceding station	Istanbul Metro	Following station
Merter towards Atatürk Havalimanı	M1a Line	Terazidere towards Yenikapı
Location

Davutpaşa–YTÜ is a rapid transit station on the M1 line of the Istanbul Metro located in southern Esenler, close to the entrance of Yıldız Technical University (Turkish: Yıldız Teknik Üniversitesi) or YTÜ. It was opened on 31 January 1994 as part of the Otogar-Zeytinburnu extension and is one of five stations of this extension.

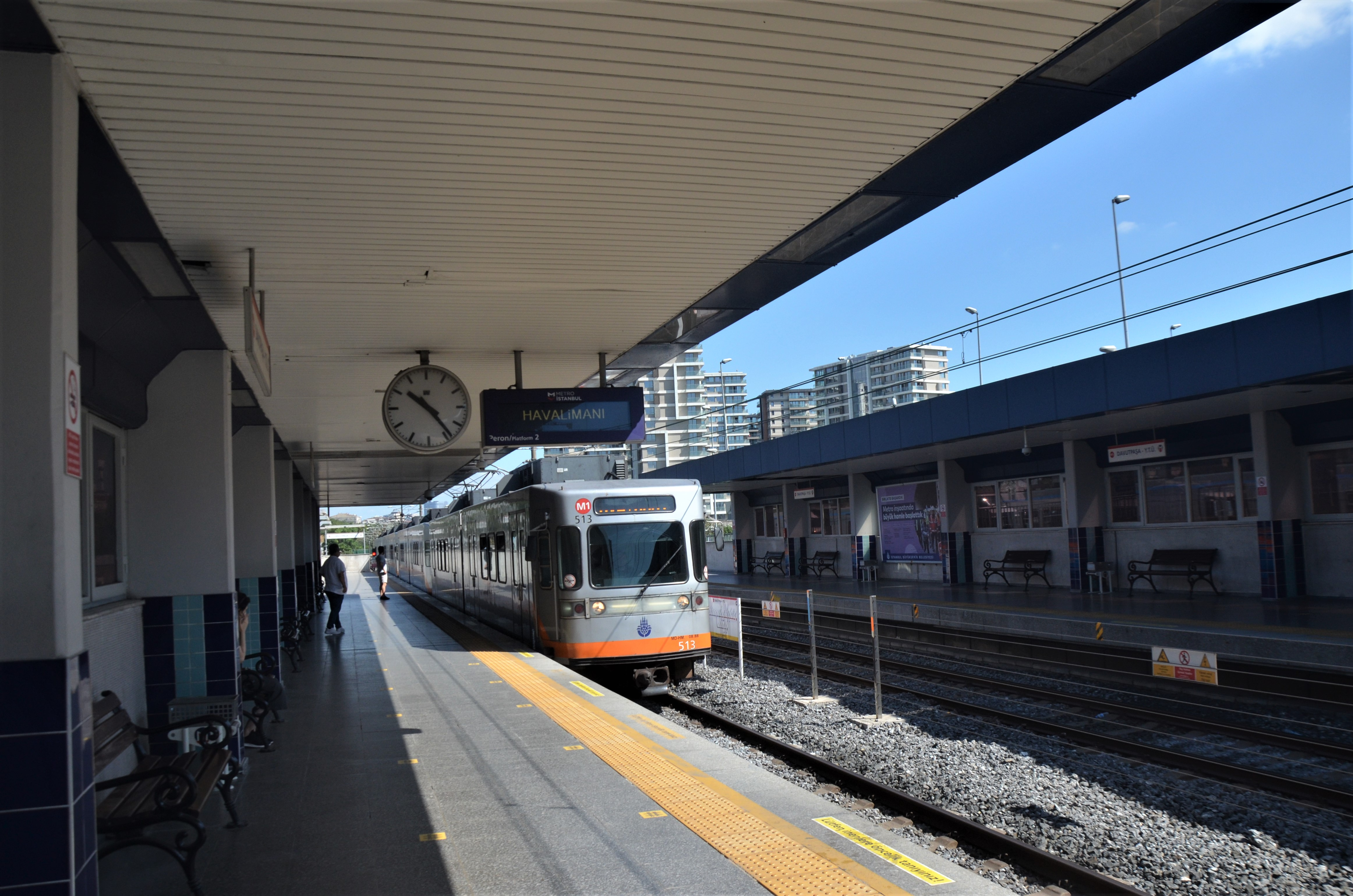
Atatürk Airport-bound Istanbul Metro line M1A train at Davutpaşa–YTÜ station.

== Layout ==
Side platform, doors will open on the right
Track 2	← toward Atatürk Havalimanı (Merter)
Track 1	toward Yenikapı (Terazidere) →
Side platform, doors will open on the right

== Gallery ==
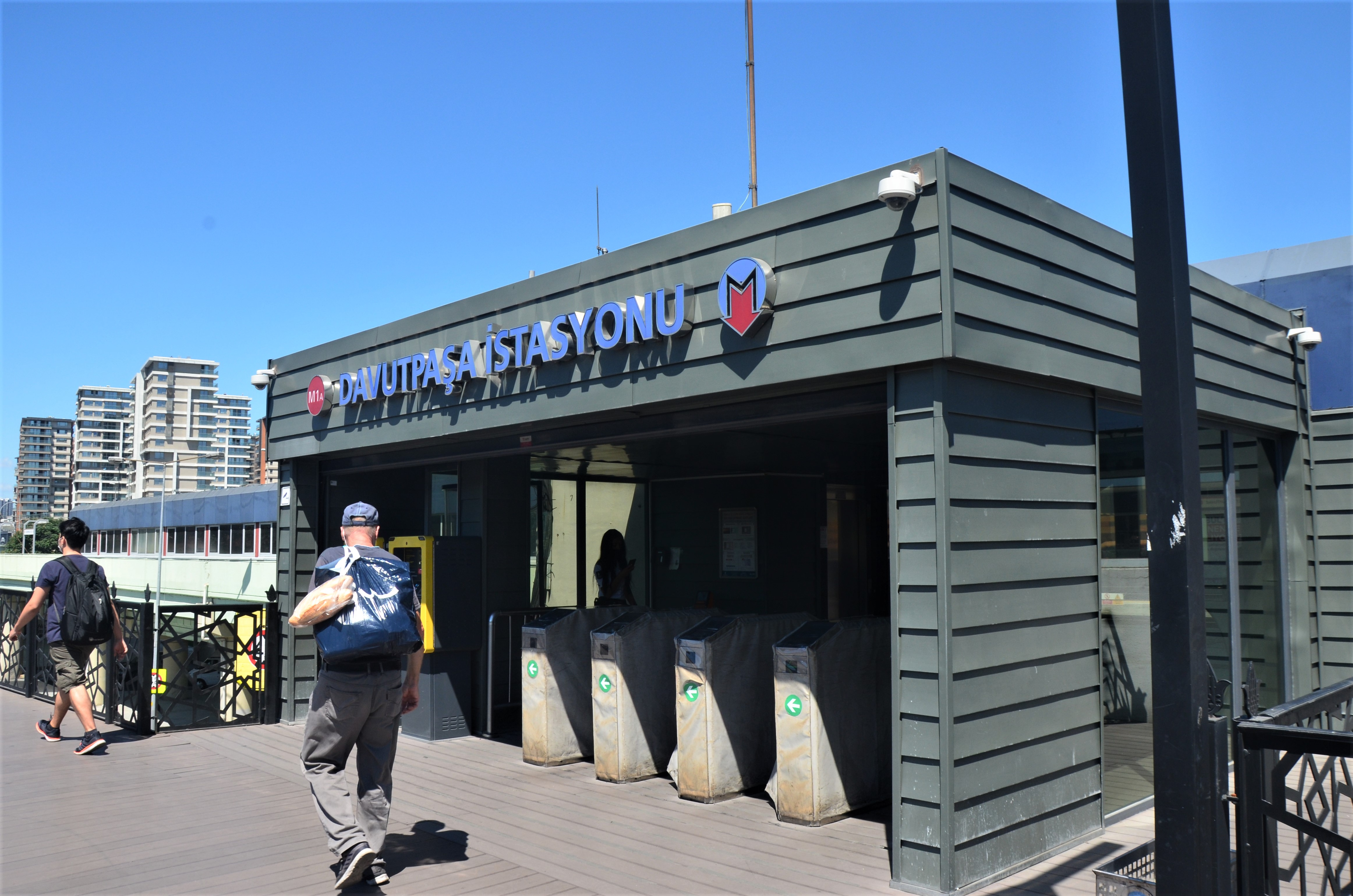
Y.T.Ü. Campus entrance

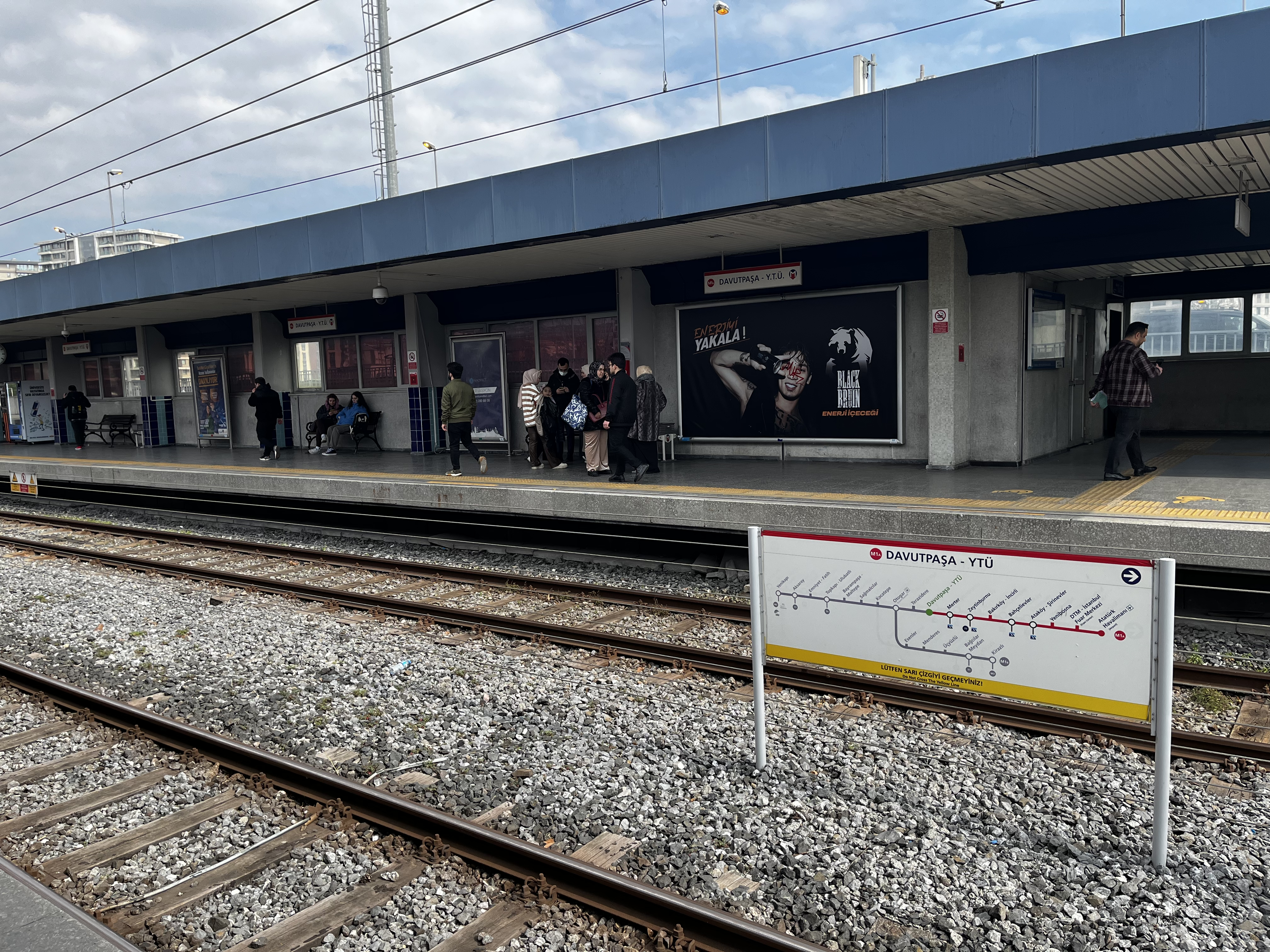
Platform view 1

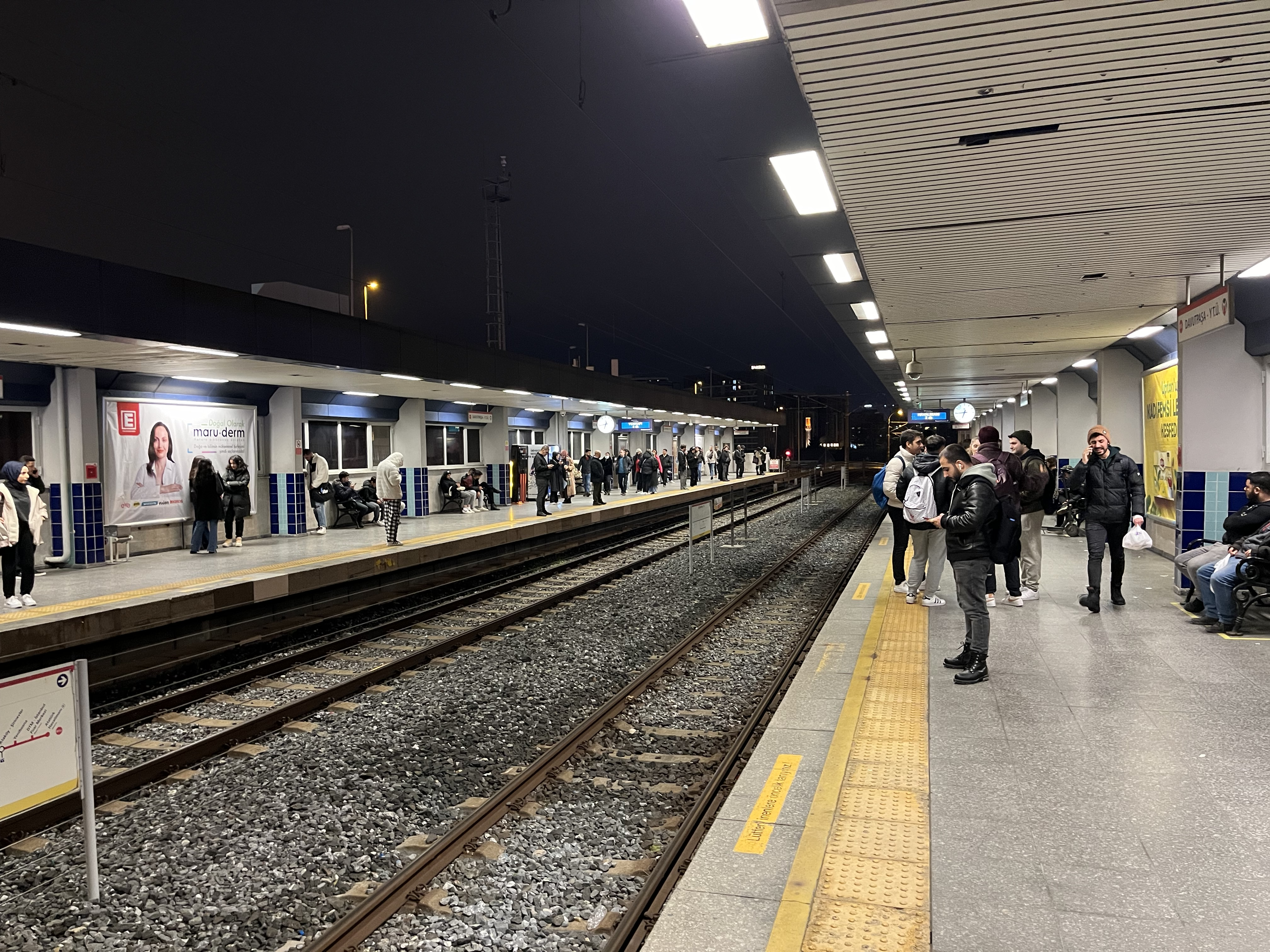
Platform view 2
