= Terazidere station =

Station of the Istanbul Metro

Terazidere
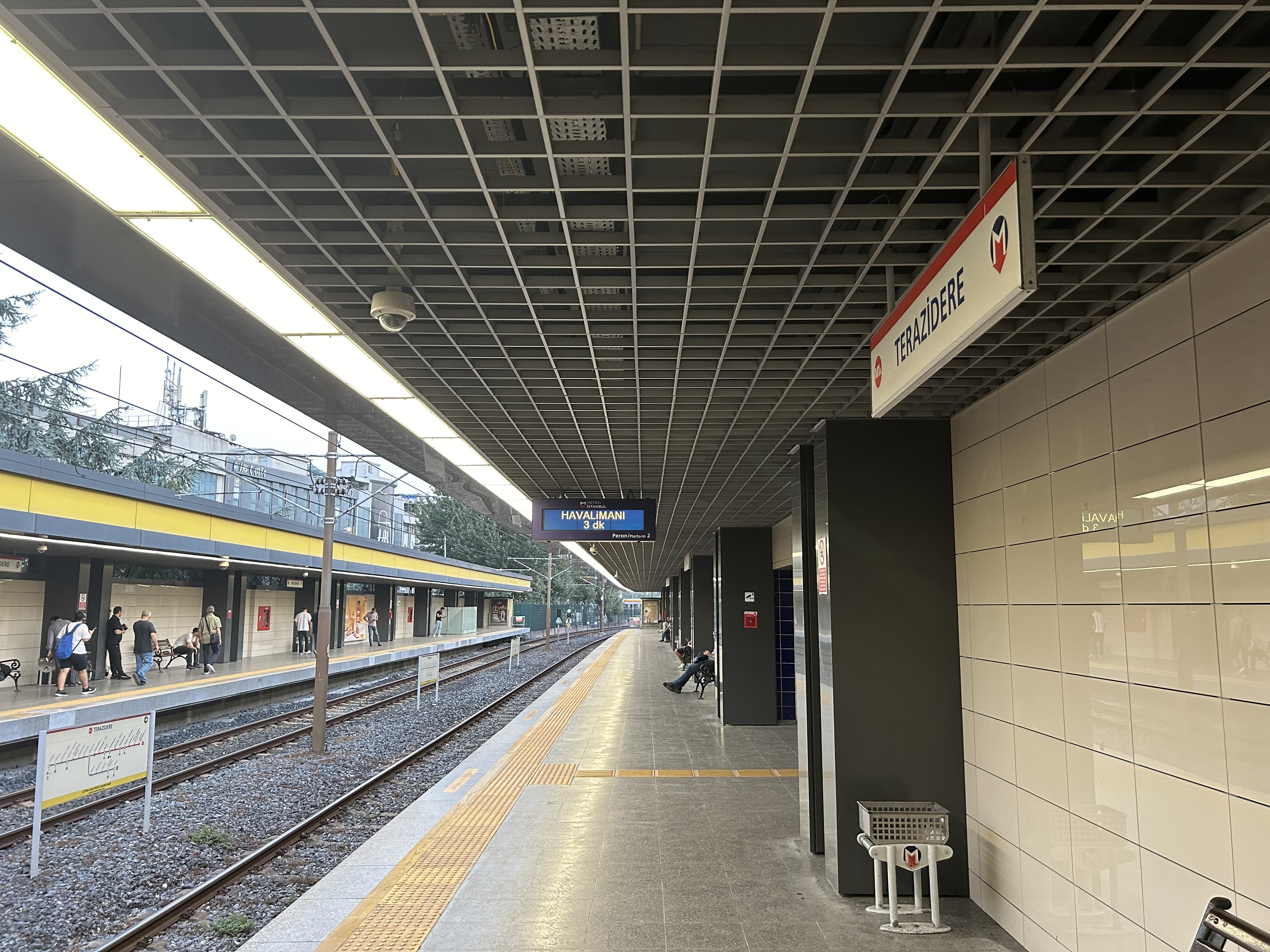
- Platform (towards Atatürk Airport)

General information
- Location: Namık Kemal Neighborhood, Dumlupınar Street, 34220; Esenler, Istanbul; Turkey
- Coordinates: 41°1′50″N 28°53′52″E
- System: Istanbul Metro rapid transit station
- Owner: Istanbul Metropolitan Municipality
- Line: M1A
- Platforms: 2 side platforms
- Tracks: 2
- Connections: Istanbul Minibus: Eyüpsultan-Otogar-Davutpaşa

Construction
- Structure type: At-grade
- Accessible: Yes

History
- Opened: 31 January 1994; 32 years ago
- Electrified: 750 V DC Overhead line

Services
Preceding station	Istanbul Metro	Following station
Davutpaşa–YTÜ towards Atatürk Havalimanı	M1a Line	Otogar towards Yenikapı
Location

Terazidere is a rapid transit station on the M1 line of the Istanbul Metro located in southern Esenler. It was opened on 31 January 1994 as part of the Otogar-Zeytinburnu extension and is one of the five stations of this extension.

== Layout ==
Side platform, doors will open on the right
Track 2	← toward Atatürk Havalimanı Davutpaşa–YTÜ)
Track 1	toward Yenikapı (Otogar) →
Side platform, doors will open on the right
