= Alibeyköy Cep Bus Terminal =

Bus terminal in Istanbul, Turkey

Alibeyköy Cep Bus Terminal Alibeyköy Cep Otogarı
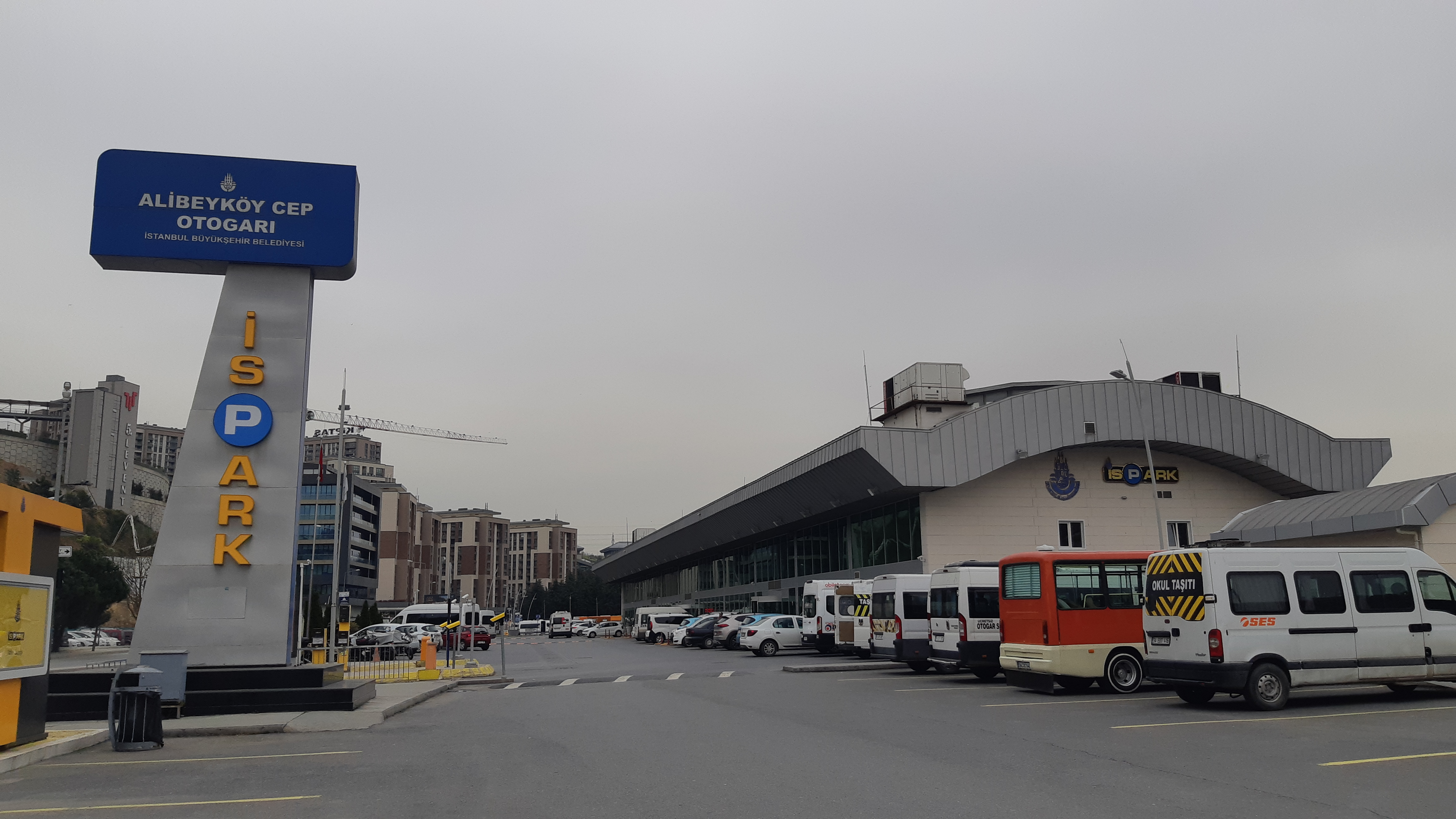

General information
- Other names: İSPARK Alibeyköy Cep Bus Terminal
- Location: Eyüpsultan, Istanbul
- Coordinates: 41.087974°N 28.94402°E
- Operated by: İSPARK
- Platforms: 110
- Bus routes: İETT: 47L, 49GB, 49Z, TM5; Minibus: Güzeltepe-Gaziosmanpaşa, Finanskent-Gaziosmanpaşa, Finanskent-Vialand
- Connections: T5 (Eminönü - Alibeyköy Bus Terminal) Tram Line

Other information
- Website: ispark.istanbul

History
- Opened: 1 January 2014

Passengers
- 110.000 (daily)
Location

Alibeyköy Cep Bus Terminal (Turkish: Alibeyköy Cep Otogarı) is Istanbul's second most used bus terminal, behind Esenler Coach Terminal. The bus terminal was opened in January 2014 and is further away from the city. The terminal is on the European side of Istanbul in the Eyüpsultan district. The terminal had 108 platforms when it was built, but its number was increased to 110 in 2018. On average around 700–800 buses go in and out every day. The management of the bus terminal is done by ISPARK. BELTUR also has a cafe in the terminal.

Alibeyköy Cep Bus Terminal is built as a new generation bus terminal. The bus terminal is inspired by airports. Technological systems utilised in the terminal are designed differently from the known classical intercity bus terminals. Vehicle number plate recognition systems of the terminal are controlled 24 hours a day by ultrasonic sensors.

== Connections ==
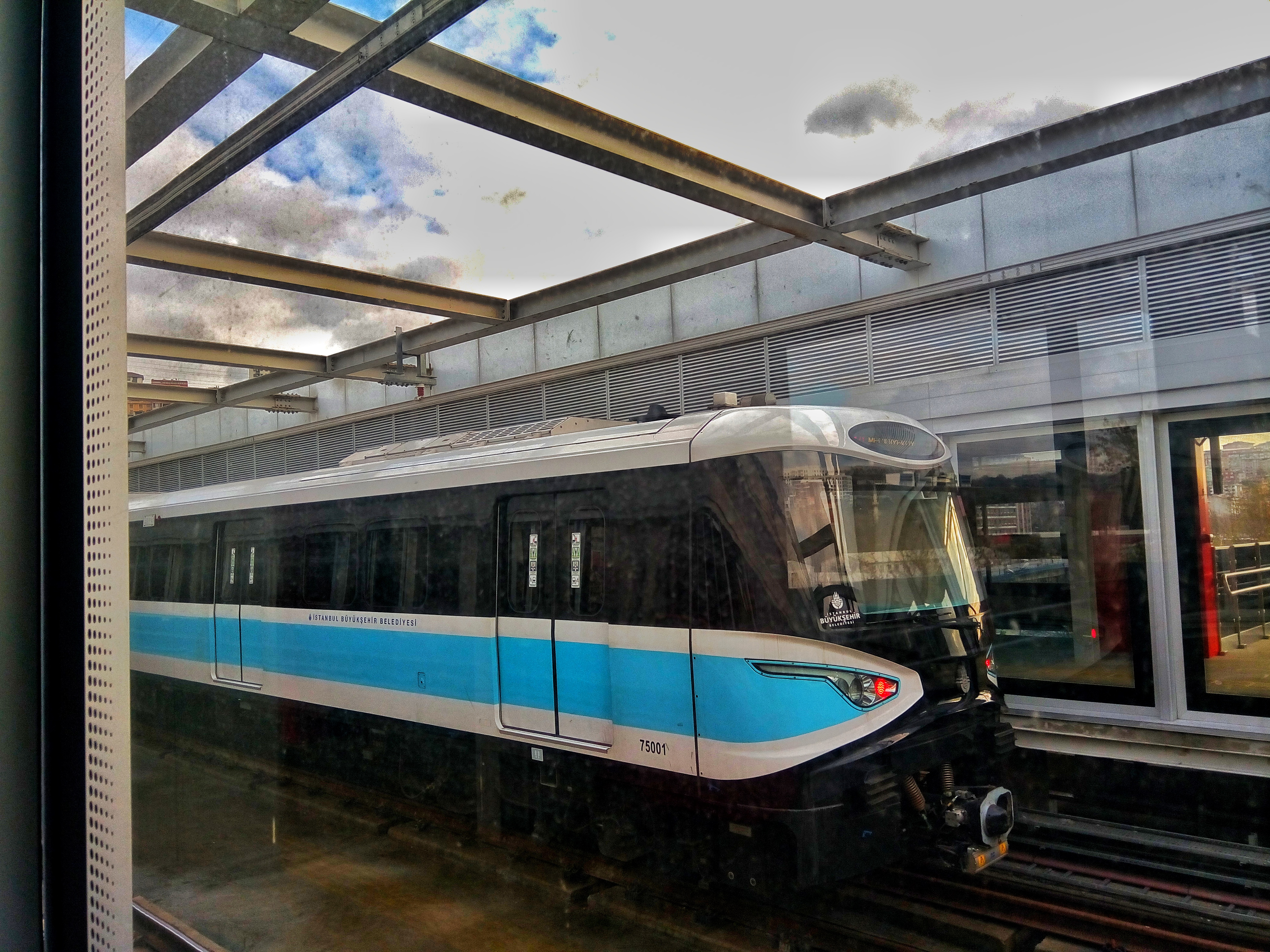
Alibeyköy Tram Station

In 2021, the first section of the Eminönü-Alibeyköy tram line consisting of 12 stations (Cibali-Alibeyköy Bus Terminal) was opened with a ceremony and the T5 line's test drive was live streamed on Ekrem İmamoğlu's YouTube channel.

There is also the Alibeyköy Metro Station that was opened in October 2020 and is 1,7 km away from the bus terminal.

47A, 47L, 48A, 49GB, 49Z bus lines also stop at the station.
