= Merter station =

Station of the Istanbul Metro

Merter
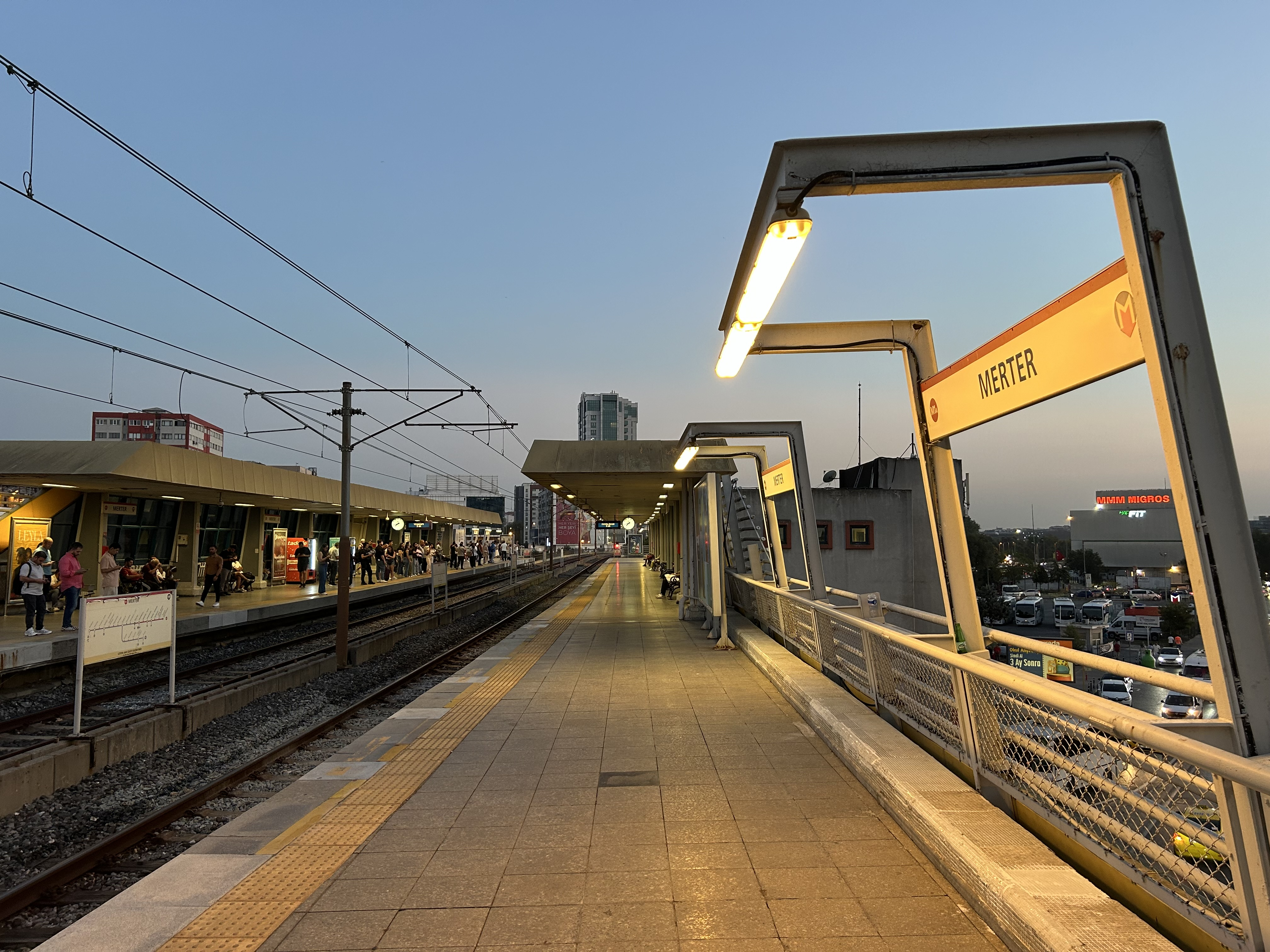
- Platform (towards Atatürk Airport)

General information
- Location: Abdurrahman Nafiz Gürman Neighborhood, D.100 Side Road, 34760; Güngören, Istanbul; Turkey
- Coordinates: 41°0′27″N 28°53′46″E
- System: Istanbul Metro rapid transit station
- Owner: Istanbul Metropolitan Municipality
- Line: M1A
- Platforms: 2 side platforms
- Tracks: 2
- Connections: Metrobus: 34, 34C, 34G, 34AS, 34BZ at Merter İETT Bus: 31, 31E, 50B, 71T, 72T, 73, 73F, 76D, 79Ş, 82, 85T, 89, 89B, 89K, 92, 92T, 97, 97A, 97BT, 97T, H-9

Construction
- Structure type: At-grade
- Accessible: Yes

History
- Opened: 31 January 1994; 32 years ago
- Electrified: 750 V DC Overhead line

Services
| Preceding station | Istanbul Metro | Following station |
|---|---|---|
| Zeytinburnu towards Atatürk Havalimanı | M1a Line | Davutpaşa–YTÜ towards Yenikapı |
Location

Merter is a rapid transit station on the M1 line of the Istanbul Metro located in southern Güngören. It was opened on 31 January 1994 as part of the Otogar-Zeytinburnu extension and is one of the five stations of this extension.

== Layout ==
| Side platform, doors will open on the right |
| Track 2 | ← toward Atatürk Havalimanı (Zeytinburnu) |
| Track 1 | toward Yenikapı (Davutpaşa–YTÜ) → |
Side platform, doors will open on the right
