= Esenler Coach Terminal =

Largest bus terminal in Istanbul, Turkey

Esenler Coach Terminal Büyük İstanbul Otogarı, Esenler Otogarı, Esenler Terminali
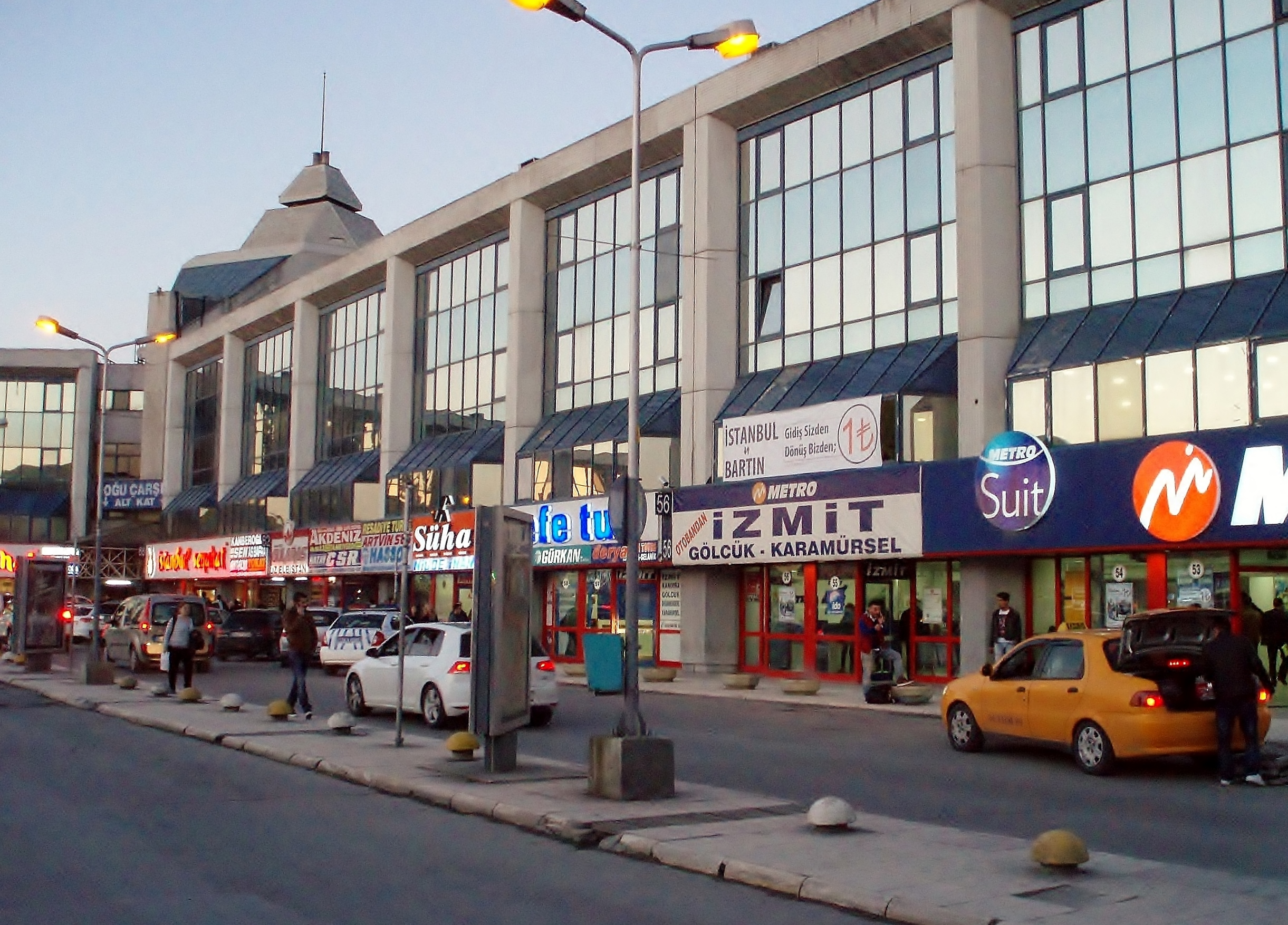
- Esenler Bus Station in Istanbul

General information
- Location: Bayrampaşa, Istanbul
- Coordinates: 41.03987°N 28.89413°E
- Owner: Istanbul Municipality
- Platforms: 324

Construction
- Platform levels: 4

History
- Opened: 1994
- Rebuilt: 2019

Passengers
- daily: 600,000+

Services
Intercity coaches, İETT city buses
Location
- Location within Istanbul Location within Turkey

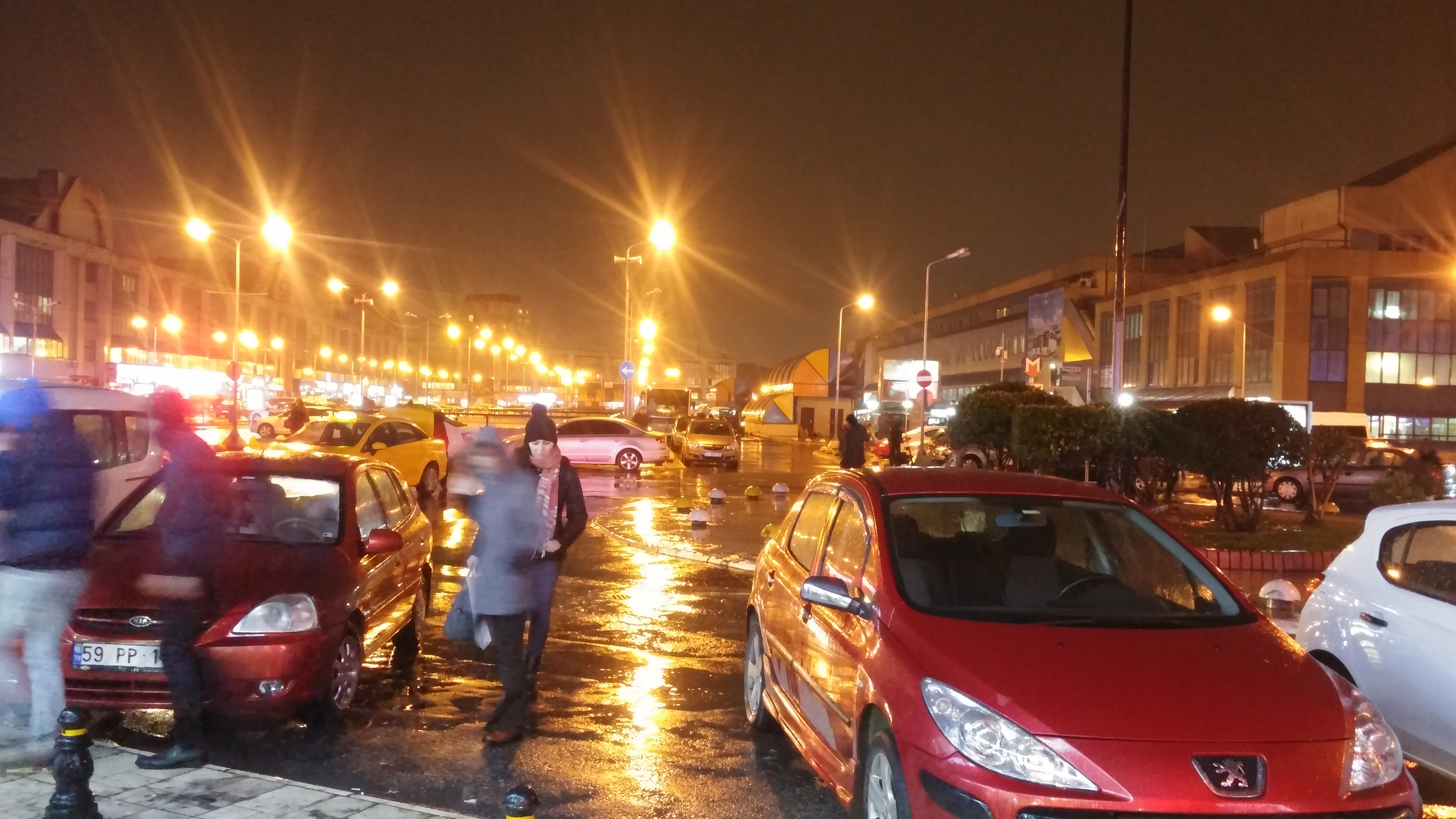
The terminal under rain

Esenler Coach Terminal, Esenler Terminal, Grand Istanbul Coach Terminal (Turkish: Esenler Otogarı, Esenler Terminali, Büyük İstanbul Otogarı) is the central and largest bus terminus for intercity bus service in Istanbul, Turkey. Since intercity buses are one of the most common modes of travel within Türkiye, the terminus holds an important place for people. Although the terminus is located in Bayrampaşa district, it is named after Esenler district, which is closer.

The multi-story terminal houses 450-500 permanent parking lots for buses and over 1,000 temporary ones. Average total traffic per day is about 15,000 buses. It also has a capacity of 600,000 passengers a day, with around 6000 people employed within the terminal. It was renovated in 2019. It now includes cultural spots like a mini library, a music studio, a theatre.

Around one million passengers pass through it every day.

== History ==
=== 1994-1999 ===
In 1980, considerations started to build a new terminus on the European side of Istanbul, since the Topkapı bus terminus was becoming increasingly crowded. In 1987, the construction of the new terminus started. In 1994, it entered service. The structure cost $140 million.

=== 2000s–present ===
In 2021, the Greater Istanbul Bus Terminal was transferred to İSPARK, a subsidiary of the metropolitan municipality. With the change of the operator of the bus station, a large-scale renovation work was started.

== Location ==
The terminus is situated on the European side of İstanbul, in Bayrampaşa district. It occupies 242,000 m^{2} (2,600,000 sq ft), which makes it the largest bus terminus in southeastern Europe and in Turkey. It is the third largest in the world. The terminus has 324 platforms.

== Services ==
There are bus services from Esenler Bus Station to all parts of Turkey. Bus companies operating in the bus station also have free shuttles throughout Istanbul. Coaches arrive and depart from almost all Turkish cities. There are also coaches that service neighbouring countries and the rest of Europe.

== Connections ==
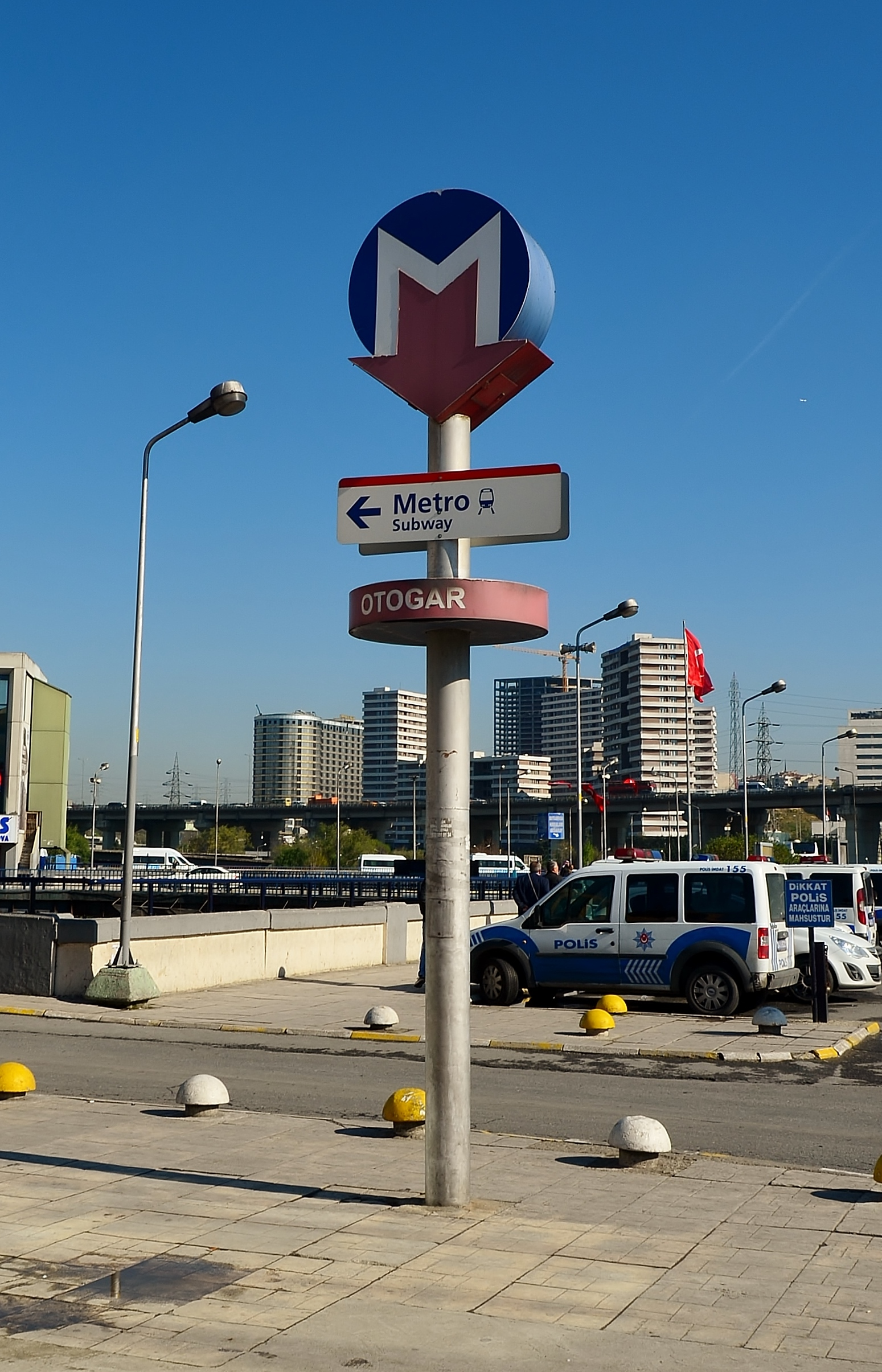
Istanbul Metro at the Esenler Terminal

- Istanbul Metro line M1 (Yenikapı-Istanbul Atatürk Airport-Kirazlı) at Otogar metro station
- Taxis
- City buses
- Private buses
- Most bus companies have shuttle service by their own minibuses (Turkish: Servis) which transport passengers to other parts of Istanbul.

== Criticism ==
Until the renovation, the bus terminal was criticized for its chaotic and ugly architecture. It had constant bus congestion. The security of the terminus was also a constant worry.
