= İsbike =

Public bicycle service in Istanbul

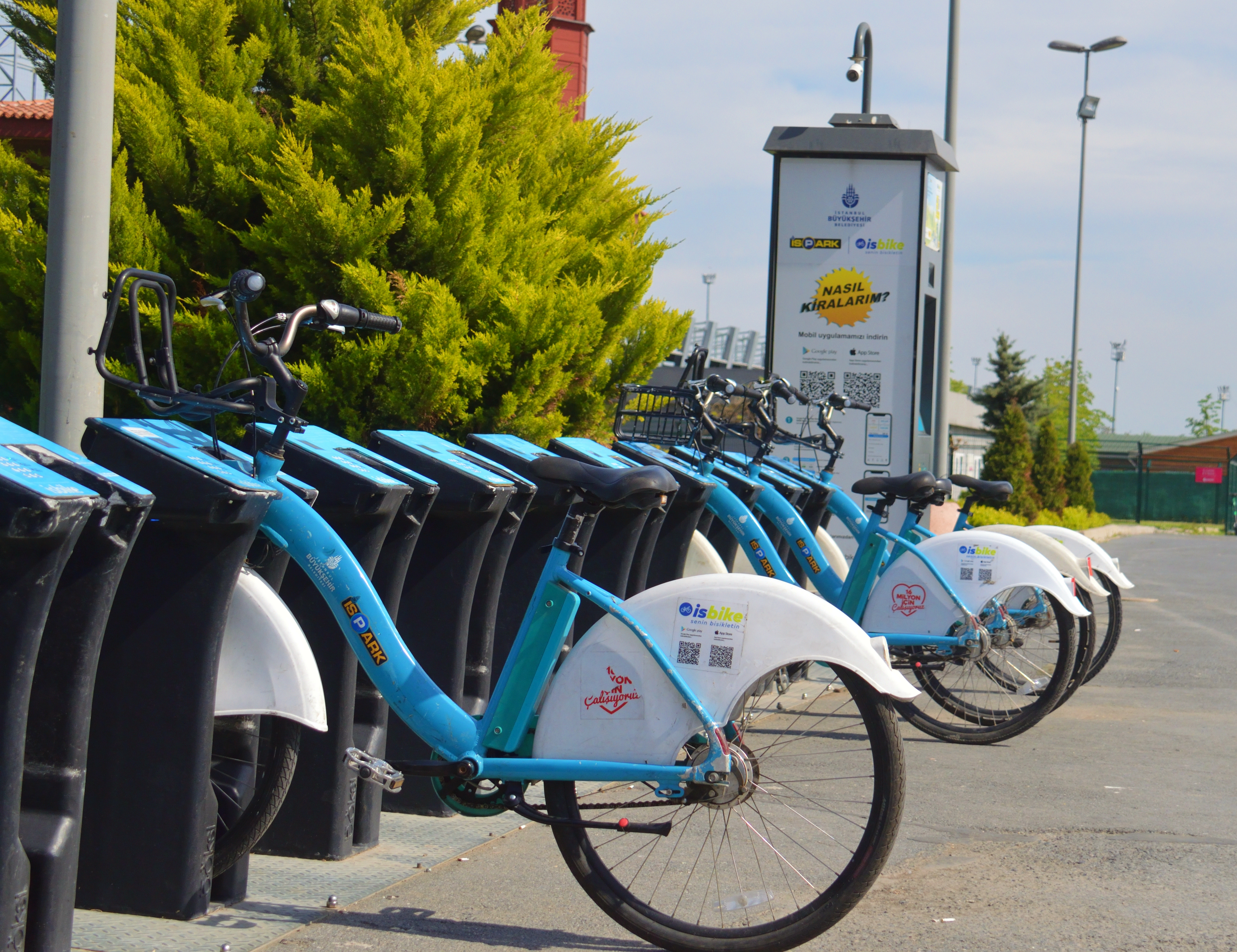

Overview
- Owner: İSPARK
- Locale: Istanbul, Turkey
- Transit type: Bicycle sharing system
- Number of stations: 300
- Website: https://www.isbike.istanbul

Operation
- Began operation: 2012
- Number of vehicles: 3000

İsbike (styled as isbike) was a public bicycle sharing system serving Istanbul, the largest city in Turkey.

Launched in 2012, it provided 300 stations and 3000 bikes on both sides of the city.

In 2022, isbike founded a bicycling school, aimed to provide bicycle training to approximately 10 thousand people.

The isbike system has been unavailable since at least late 2023, and some bicycles in storage have reportedly been scrapped.

== System components ==
The system uses Baksi smart biking system. The users can either get membership or use their credit cards to access the bikes.

=== Rates ===
All trips are charged, whether or not the user is a member.

== Maintenance ==
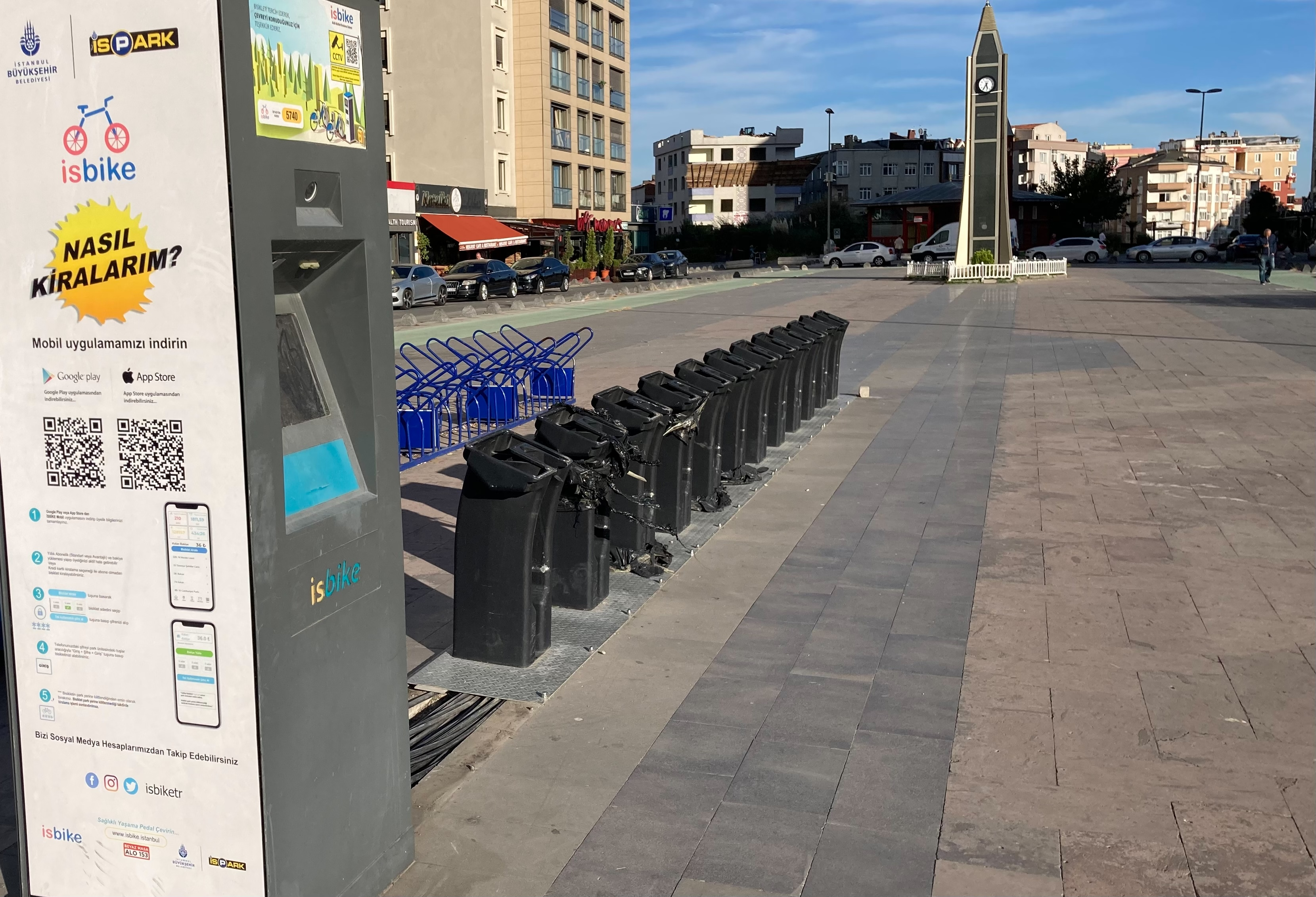
Out of action docking station in September 2022

isbike was included in the 2022 budget due to votes by city residents. Due to maintenance bikes were not available in January 2022, but later that year there were complaints about empty and closed stations, for example in Zeytinburnu.

== See also ==
- Bicycle sharing system
- List of bicycle sharing systems
- Utility cycling - Short-term hire schemes
