= İSPARK =

Company in Istanbul, Turkey

İSPARK İstanbul Otopark İşletmeleri Tic. AŞ
- Company type: Anonim Şirket
- Founded: 2005
- Products: İsbike; Heliport; Alibeyköy Cep Bus Terminal; İstmarin
- Parent: Istanbul Metropolitan Municipality
- Website: www.ispark.istanbul

İstanbul Otopark İşletmeleri Tic. AŞ (Istanbul Parking Lot Operations Trade S.A), or simply İSPARK, is a company that operates parking lots in Istanbul. Managed by the Istanbul Metropolitan Municipality, the company provides service in 606 parking lots and also is a member of the European Parking Association.

In 2012, İspark carried out the bicycle parking project İsbike to increase environmental consciousness in Istanbul. In 2014, the company built boat parks which in İstinye and Tarabya Bays, a year later the company announced that they were planning to build boat parks in Bebek, Beykoz, Kuruçeşme and Paşabahçe, but these plans were abandoned. The company also owns the Alibeyköy Bus Terminal in Istanbul.

== Projects ==
=== iTaksi ===
iTaksi is a ridesharing app (e-taxi app) that was founded in 2016 by the Istanbul Metropolitan Municipality. The app has its own display for taxi drivers to see the map, this display also works as a POS screen for contactless credit cards and Istanbulkarts.

=== İsbike ===
İsbike (styled as isbike) is a public bicycle sharing system serving Istanbul, the largest city in Turkey.

Launched in 2012, it serves with 300 stations and 3000 bikes on both sides of the city.

In 2022, isbike founded a bicycling school, aimed to provide bicycle training to approximately 10 thousand people.
