= Zeytinburnu metro station =

Station of the Istanbul Metro

Zeytinburnu
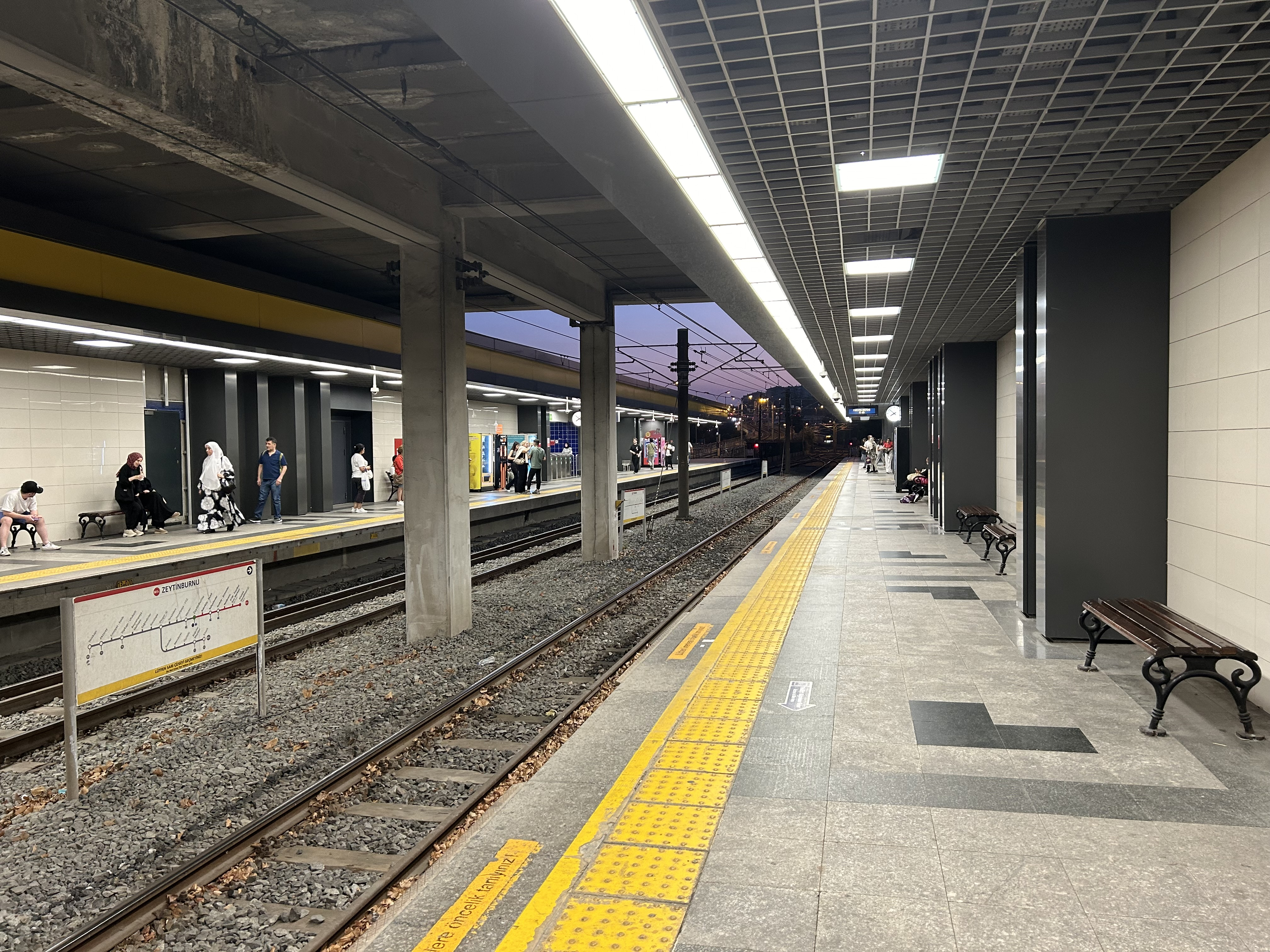
- Platform (towards Atatürk Airport)

General information
- Location: Osmaniye Neighborhood, E-5 Çırpıcı Side Road, 34146; Bakırköy, Istanbul; Turkey
- Coordinates: 41°0′8″N 28°53′22″E
- System: Istanbul Metro rapid transit station
- Owner: Istanbul Metropolitan Municipality
- Line: M1A
- Platforms: 2 side platforms
- Tracks: 2
- Connections: Istanbul Tram: T1 at Zeytinburnu; Metrobus: 34, 34C, 34G, 34AS, 34BZ at Zeytinburnu İETT Bus: 31, 31E, 50B, 71T, 72T, 73, 73F, 76D, 78ZB, 79G, 79Ş, 82, 89, 89A, 89B, 89K, 89M, 89S, 92, 93, 93M, 93T, 97, 97A, 97B, 97BT, 97KZ, 97T, 145, H-9, MK97, MR10; Istanbul Minibus: Merter-Yenimahalle, Topkapı-Merter, Merter-Cevizlibağ

Construction
- Structure type: At-grade
- Accessible: Yes

History
- Opened: 31 January 1994; 32 years ago
- Electrified: 750 V DC Overhead line

Services
Preceding station	Istanbul Metro	Following station
Bakırköy–İncirli towards Atatürk Havalimanı	M1a Line	Merter towards Yenikapı
Location

Zeytinburnu is a rapid transit station on the M1 line of the Istanbul Metro. Even though it is named Zeytinburnu, the station is not located within Zeytinburnu district borders but within Bakırköy district borders close to Zeytinburnu. It was opened on 31 January 1994 as part of the Otogar-Zeytinburnu extension and is one of the five stations of this extension.

== Layout ==
Side platform, doors will open on the right
Track 2	← toward Atatürk Havalimanı (Bakırköy–İncirli)
Track 1	toward Yenikapı (Merter) →
Side platform, doors will open on the right

== Gallery ==
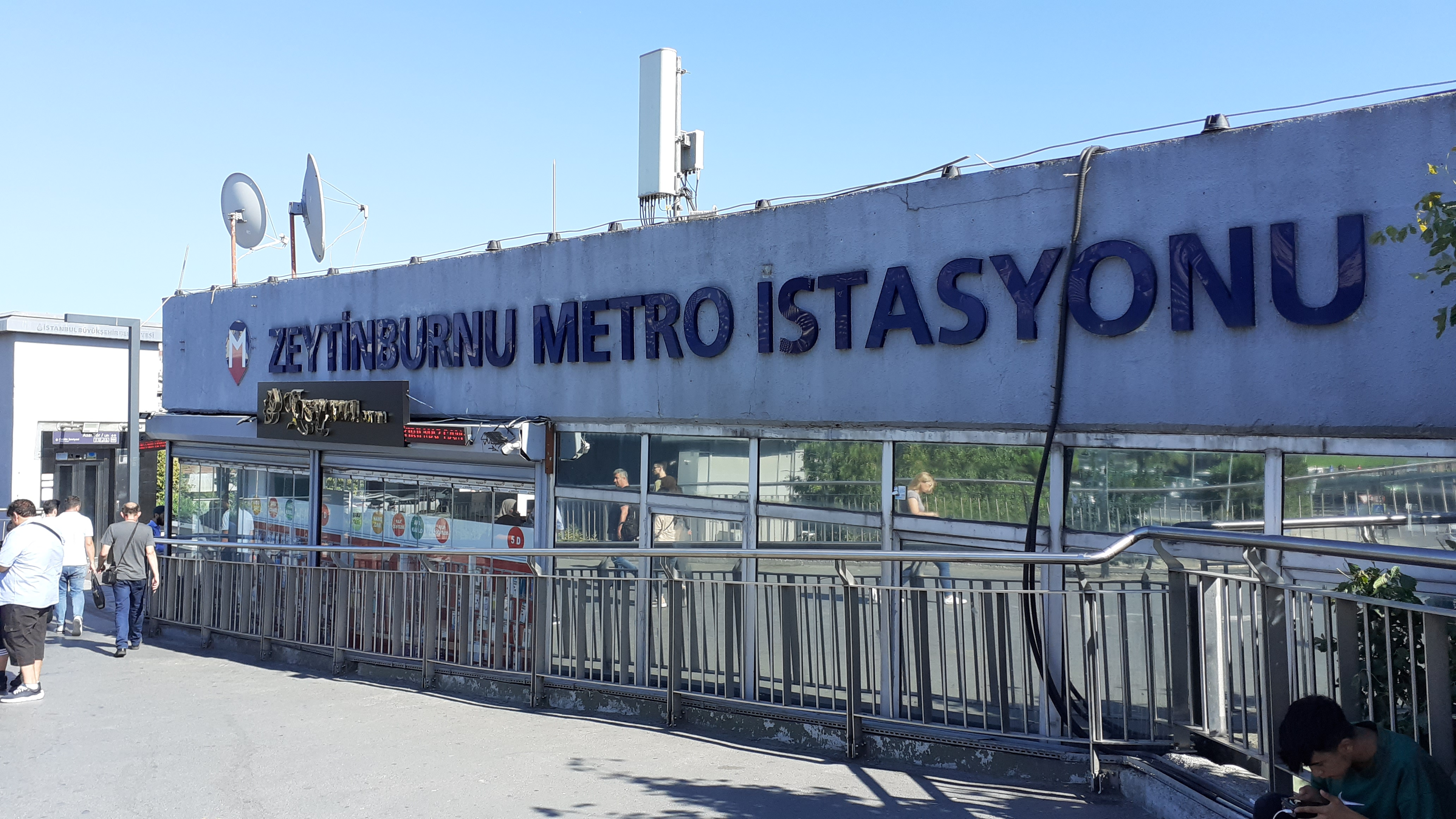
Signage

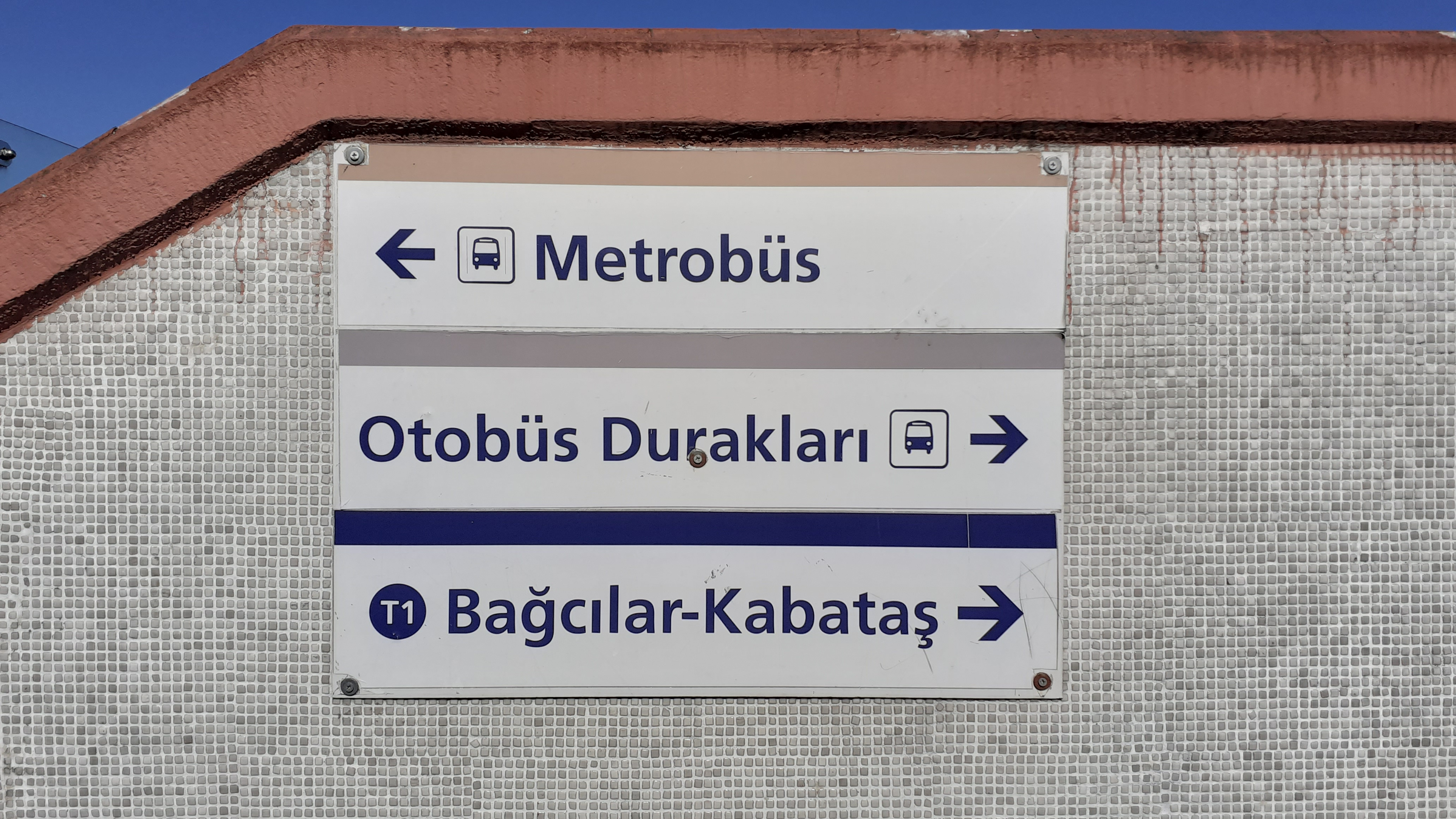
Transfer directions

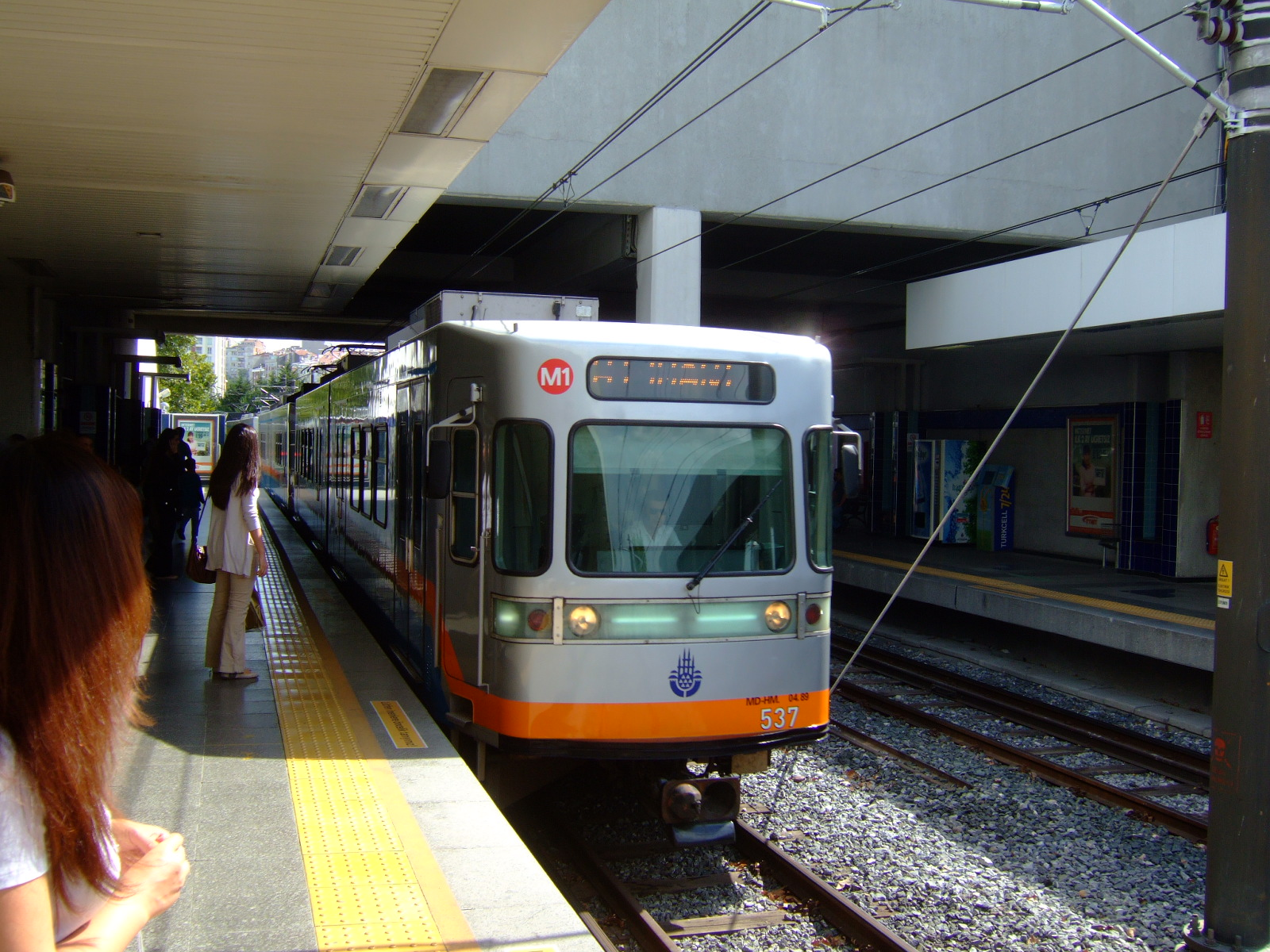
Platform view 1

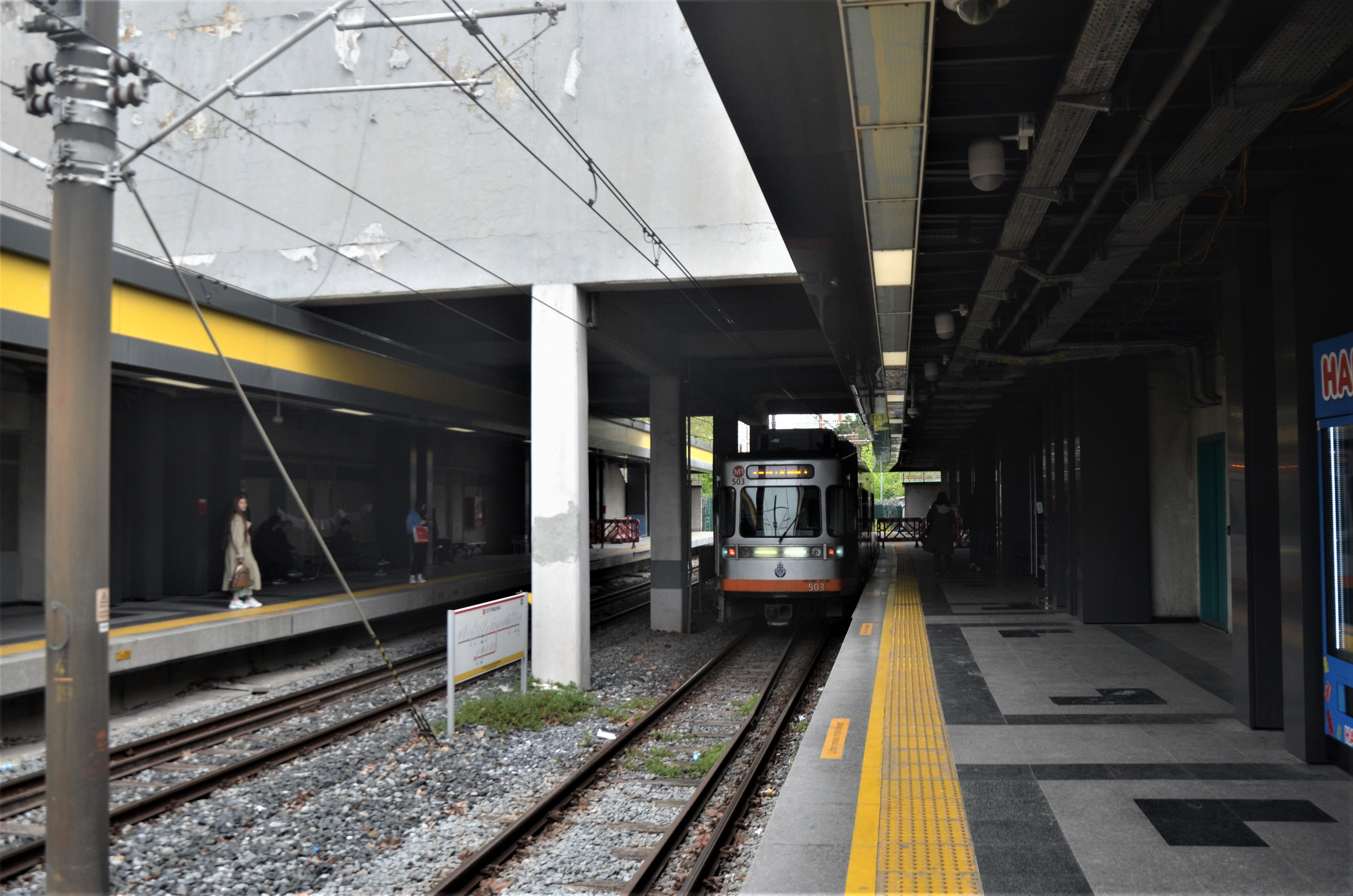
Platform view 2
