= Otogar station =

Station of the Istanbul Metro

Otogar
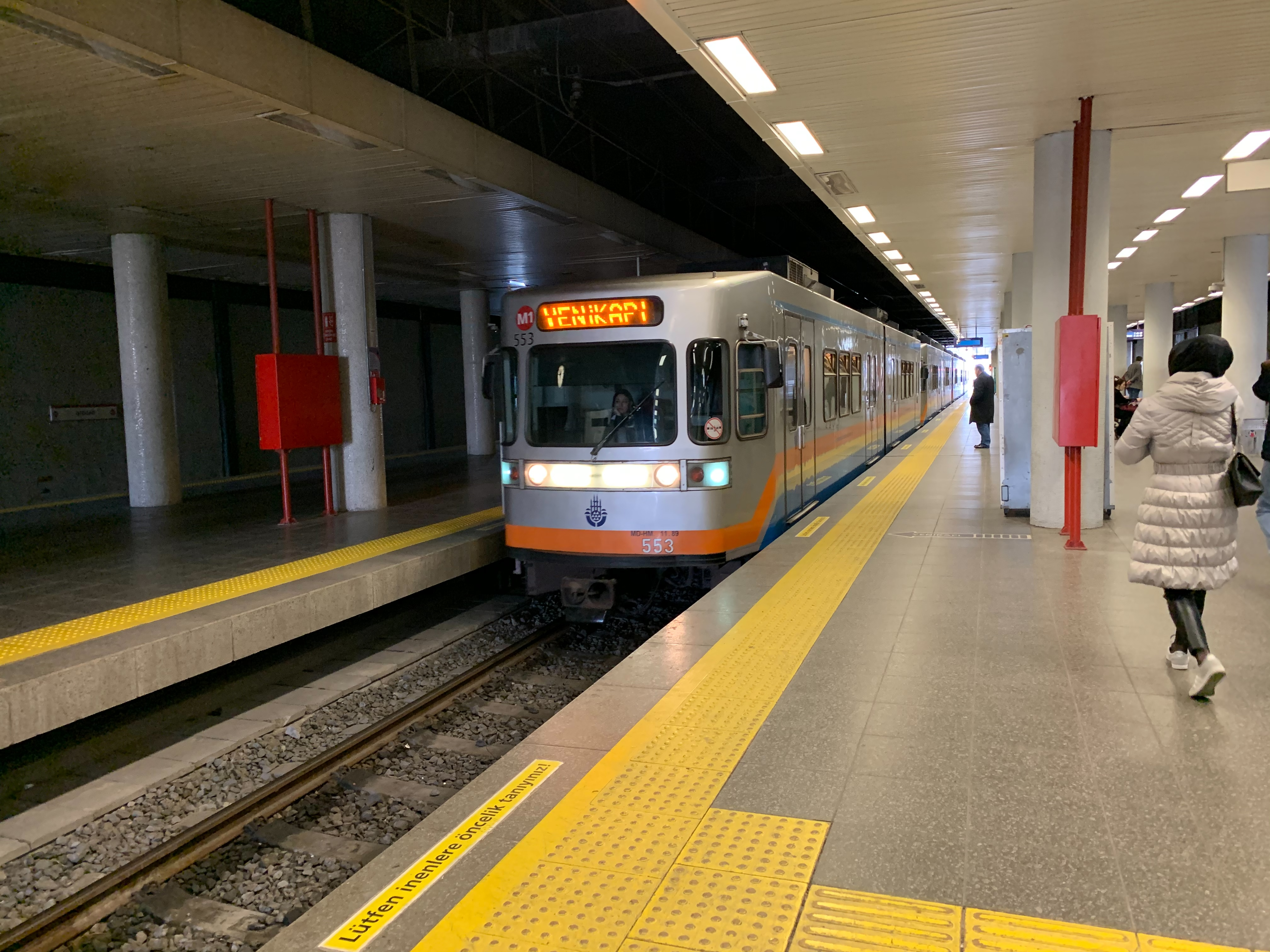
- Otogar Station

General information
- Coordinates: 41.0389°N 28.8944°E
- System: Istanbul Metro rapid transit station
- Owner: Istanbul Metropolitan Municipality
- Lines: M1A; M1B
- Platforms: 2 island platform
- Tracks: 3
- Connections: İETT Bus: 50R, 76O, 303B, İST-3; Istanbul Minibus: Gaziosmanpaşa-Otogar, Otogar-Edirnekapı, Topkapı-Otocenter, Topkapı-Otogar - İstoç, Otogar-Yunus Emre Mahallesi, Bakırköy-Otogar, Eyüpsultan-Otogar-Davutpaşa, Bahçelievler Metro-Oto Sanayi, Deprem Konutları-Otogar, İkitelli Organize Sanayi-Otogar, Kayaşehir-Otogar

Construction
- Structure type: Underground
- Accessible: Yes

History
- Opened: 31 January 1994; 32 years ago
- Electrified: 750 V DC Overhead line

Services
Preceding station	Istanbul Metro	Following station
Terazidere towards Atatürk Havalimanı	M1a Line	Kocatepe towards Yenikapı
Esenler towards Kirazlı	M1b Line	Kocatepe towards Yenikapı
Location

Otogar is a rapid transit station on the M1 line of the Istanbul Metro. It is located in southwestern Bayrampaşa in the center of the Esenler Bus Terminal.

Otogar was opened on 31 January 1994 as part of the M1's extension to Zeytinburnu. The station has three tracks with two island platforms and is one of only five stations in the metro system to have such a layout, the others being Yenikapı, Bostancı, Sanayi and Olimpiyat. West of Otogar the M1 splits into M1A and M1B service. M1A continues southwest on the original line to Istanbul Atatürk Airport, while the M1B branches off and heads west to Kirazlı, where connection to the M3 is available. Otogar is one of the busiest stations in Istanbul as it lies in the center of the main intercity and regional bus terminal of the city. Buses to many cities in Turkey as well as Europe depart from the Esenler terminal. Otogar station is referred to in English as Coach Station on maps and signs.

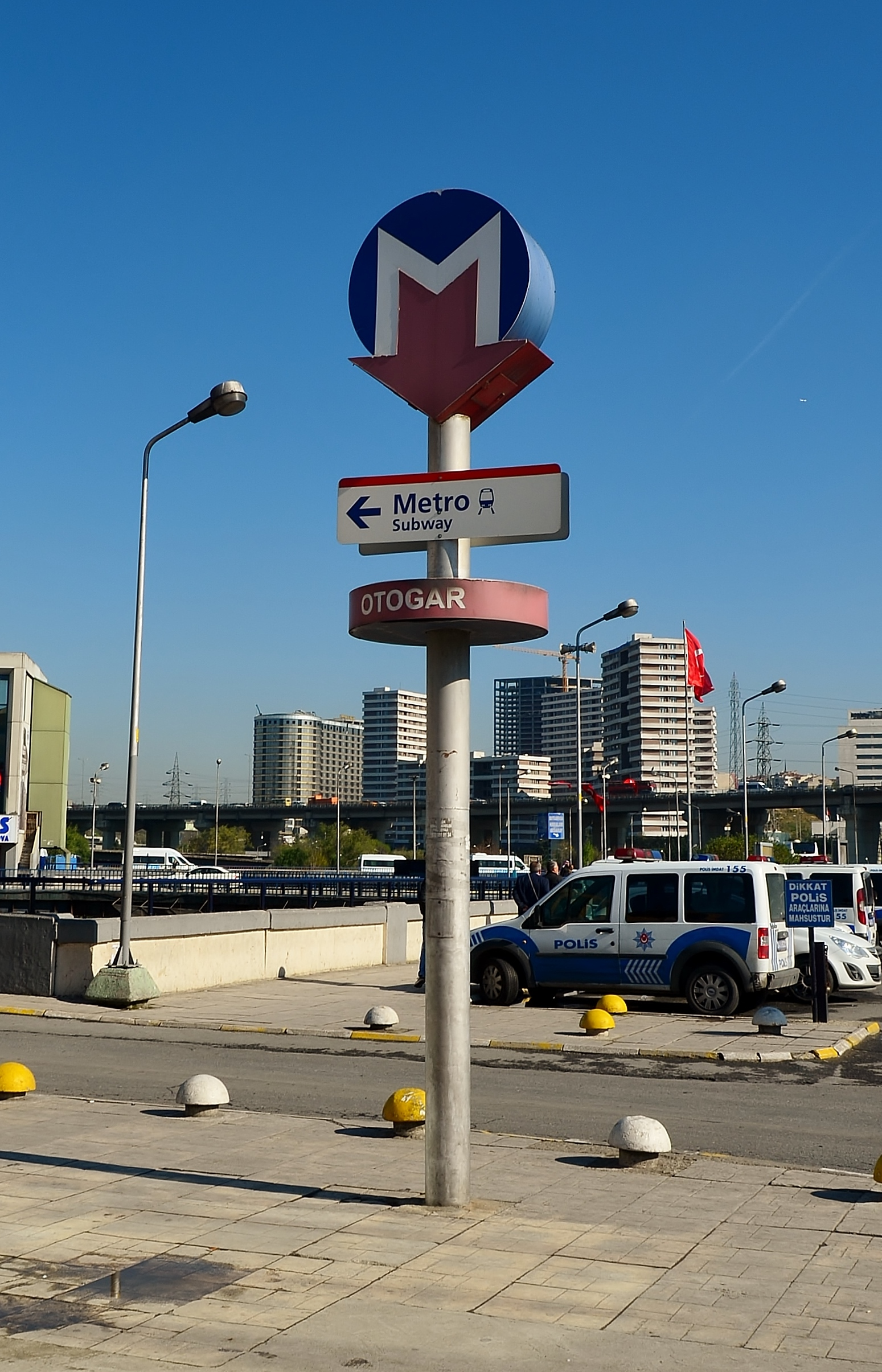
Metro sign at Otogar station

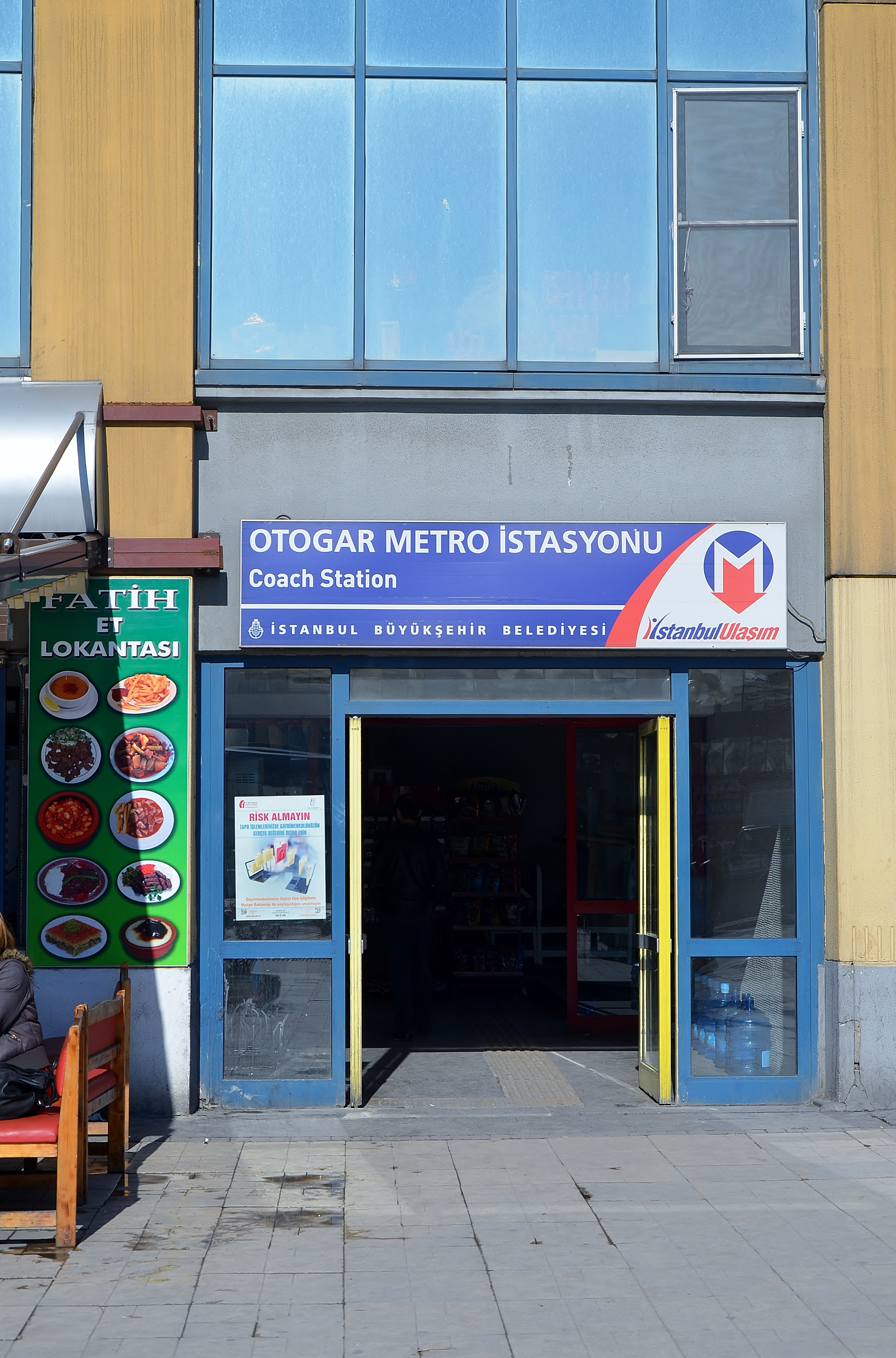
Entrance to Otogar metro station

== Layout ==
Track 2	← toward Atatürk Havalimanı (Terazidere) ← toward Kirazlı (Esenler)
Island platform, doors will open on the left
Track 3	toward Yenikapı → toward Yenikapı →
Island platform, currently unused
Track 1	No passenger service
