= İkitelli Sanayi station =

Station of the Istanbul Metro

İkitelli Sanayi (M3) İkitelli Sanayi (M9)
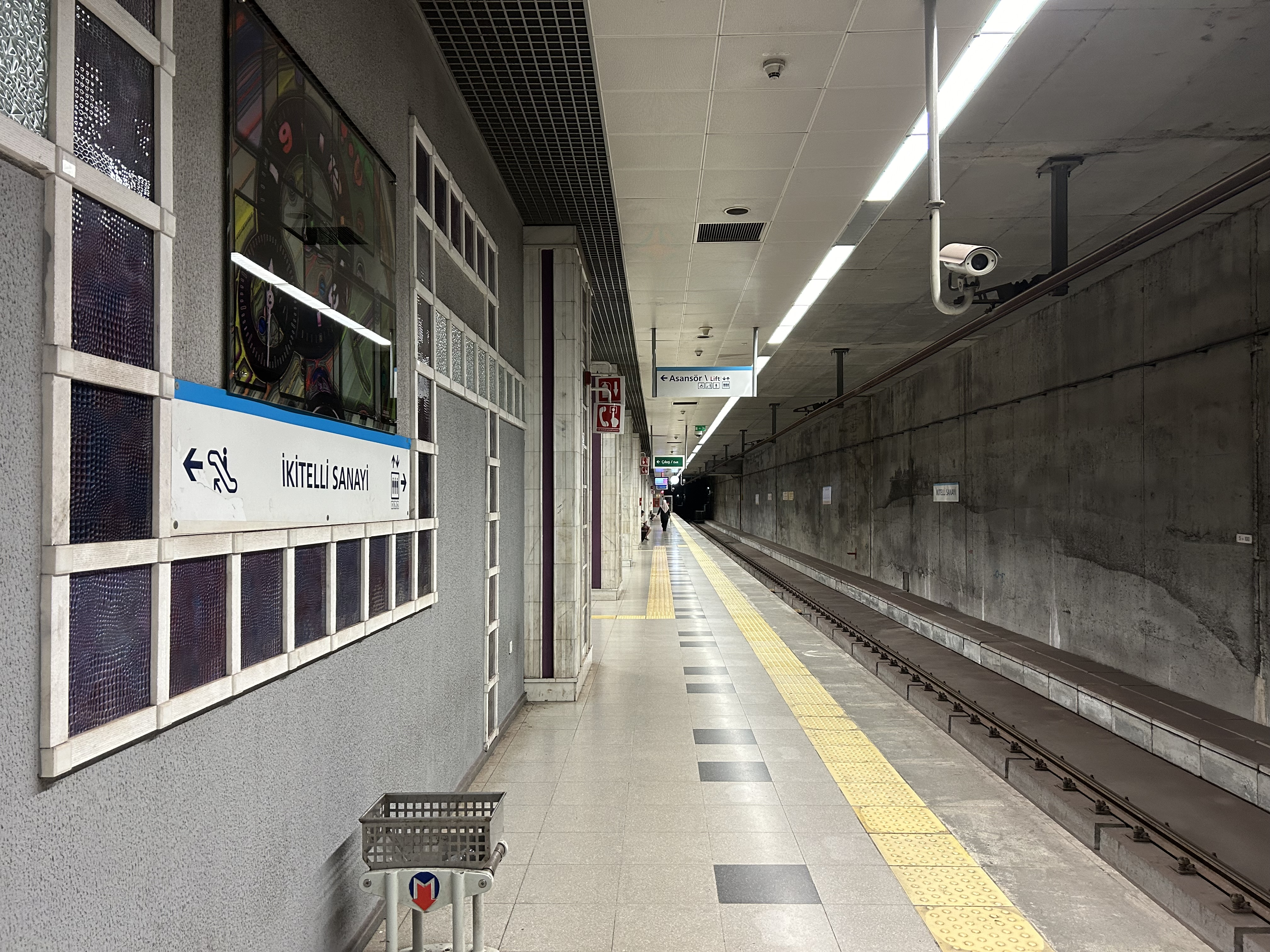
- M3 platform

General information
- Location: Ziya Gökalp Neighborhood, Bedrettin Dalan Boulevard, 34490; Başakşehir, Istanbul; Turkey
- Coordinates: 41°4′16″N 28°48′12″E
- System: Istanbul Metro rapid transit station
- Owner: Istanbul Metropolitan Municipality
- Line: M3 M9
- Platforms: M3: 1 island platform M9: 1 island platform
- Tracks: M3: 2 M9: 2
- Connections: İETT Bus: 31Y, 82S, MK31; Istanbul Minibus: Şirinevler-Kayaşehir

Construction
- Structure type: Underground
- Parking: No
- Cycle facilities: Yes
- Accessible: Yes

History
- Opened: 14 June 2013 (13 years ago)
- Electrified: 1,500 V DC Overhead line

Services
Preceding station	Istanbul Metro	Following station
Turgut Özal towards Kayaşehir Merkez	M3 Line	İSTOÇ towards Bakırköy Sahil
Ziya Gökalp Mahallesi towards Olimpiyat	M9 Line	MASKO towards Ataköy
Location

İkitelli Sanayi is an underground rapid transit interchange station on the M3 and M9 lines of the Istanbul Metro. It is located in southern Başakşehir under Bedrettin Dalan Boulevard. It has an island platform serviced by two tracks. It opened on 14 June 2013 and became an interchange station with the M9 on 29 May 2021.

== Layout ==
Northbound	← toward Kayaşehir Merkez (Turgut Özal)
Island platform, doors will open on the left
Southbound	toward Bakırköy Sahil (İSTOÇ) →
Northbound	← toward Olimpiyat (Ziya Gökalp Mahallesi)
Island platform, doors will open on the left
Southbound	toward Ataköy (MASKO) →

== Operation information ==
The M3 line operates between 06:00 and 00:00 and train frequency is 7 minutes at peak hours and 10 minutes at all other times. The M9 line operates between 06:00 and 00:00 and train frequency is 9 minutes. Both lines have no night service.

== Gallery ==
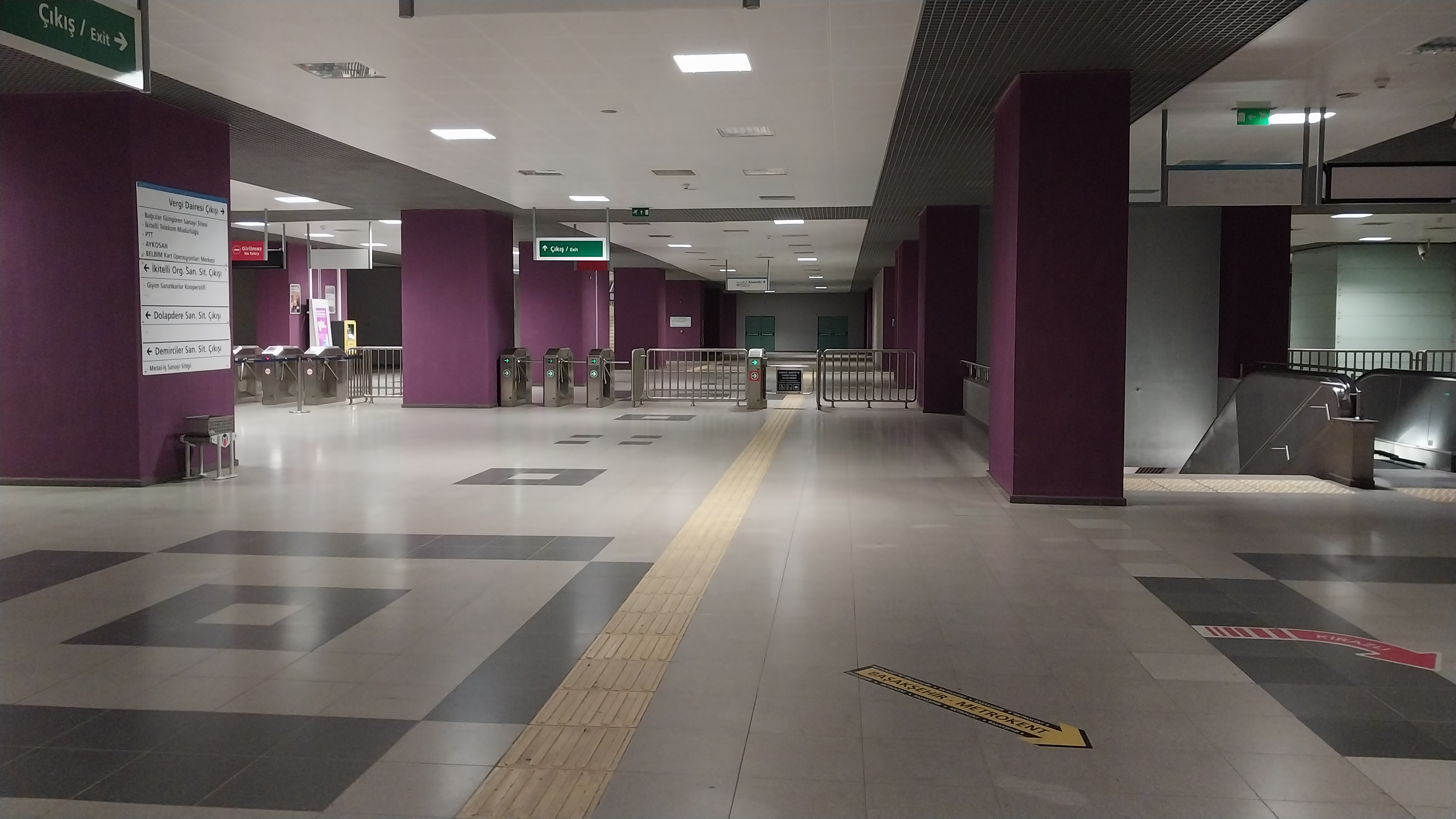
Ticket hall

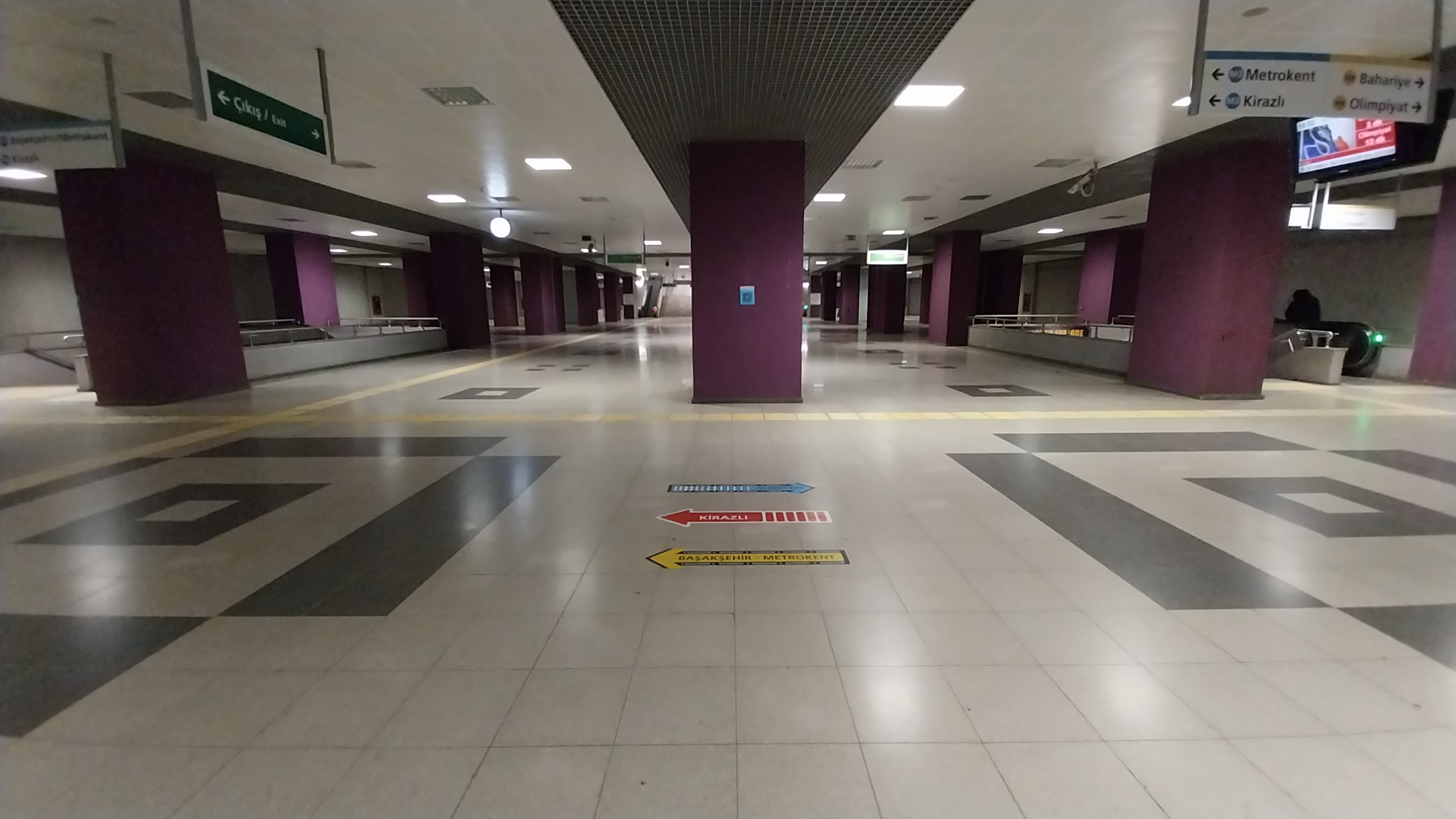
Transfer level

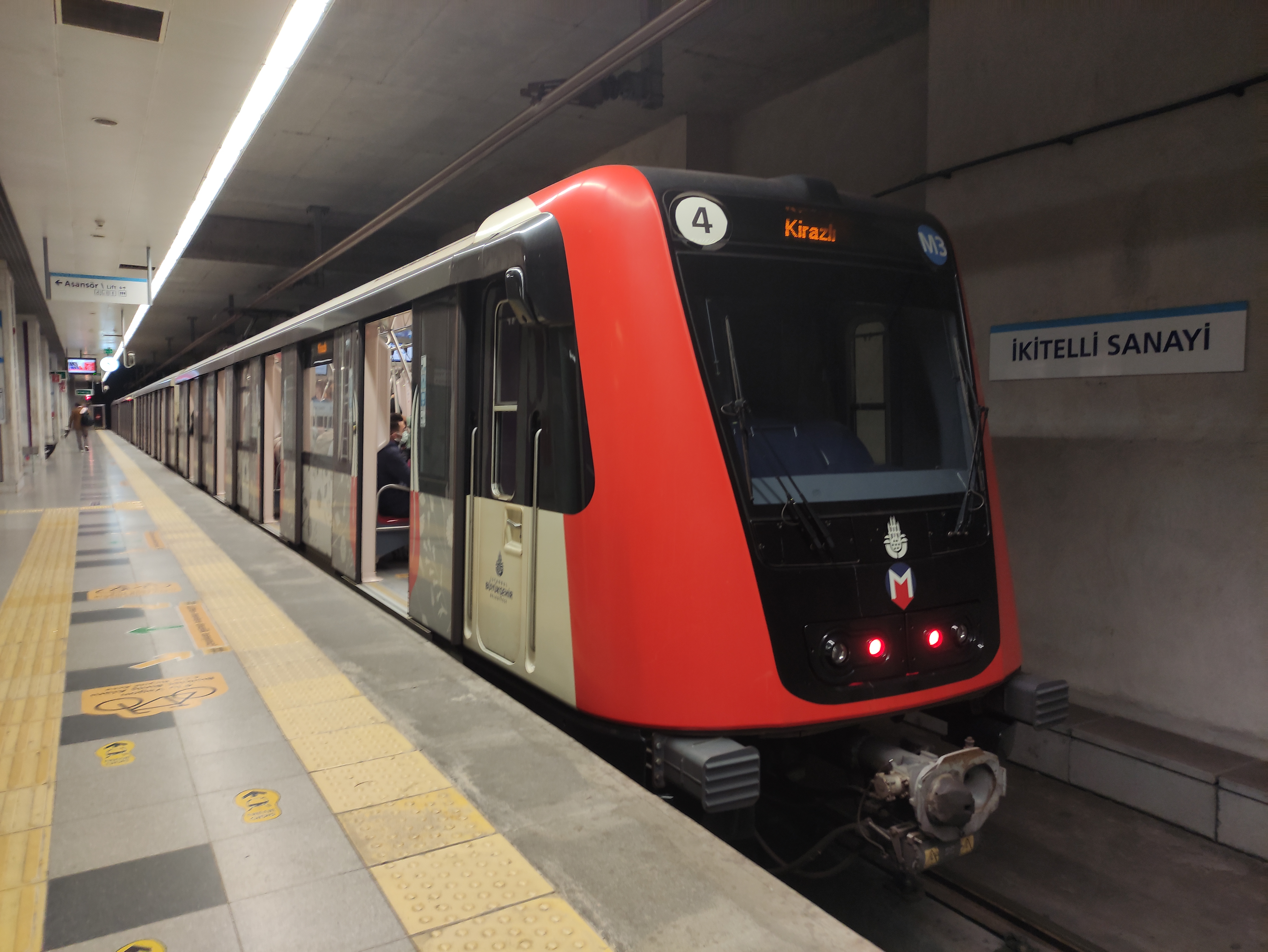
Train at the platform

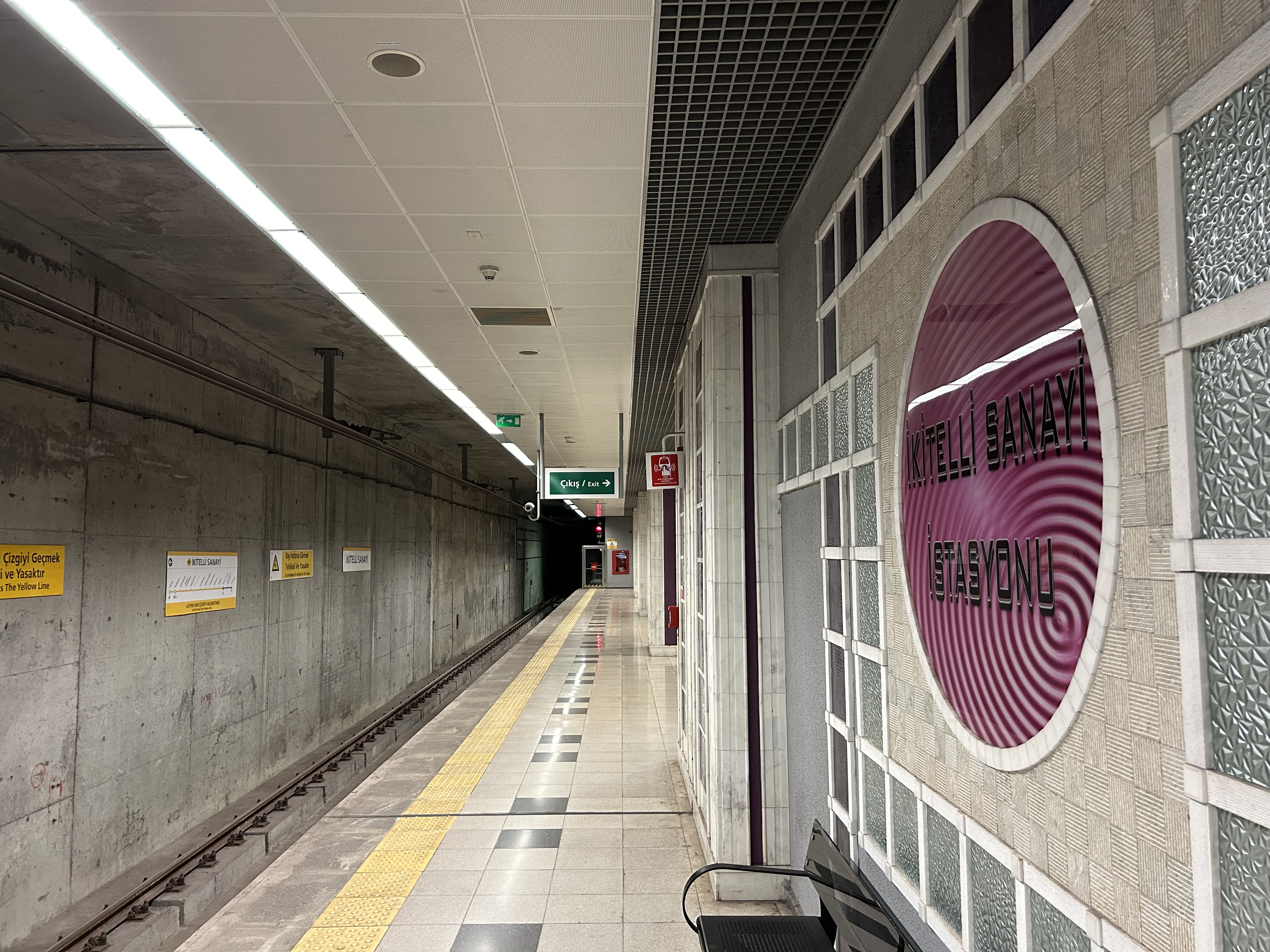
M9 platform

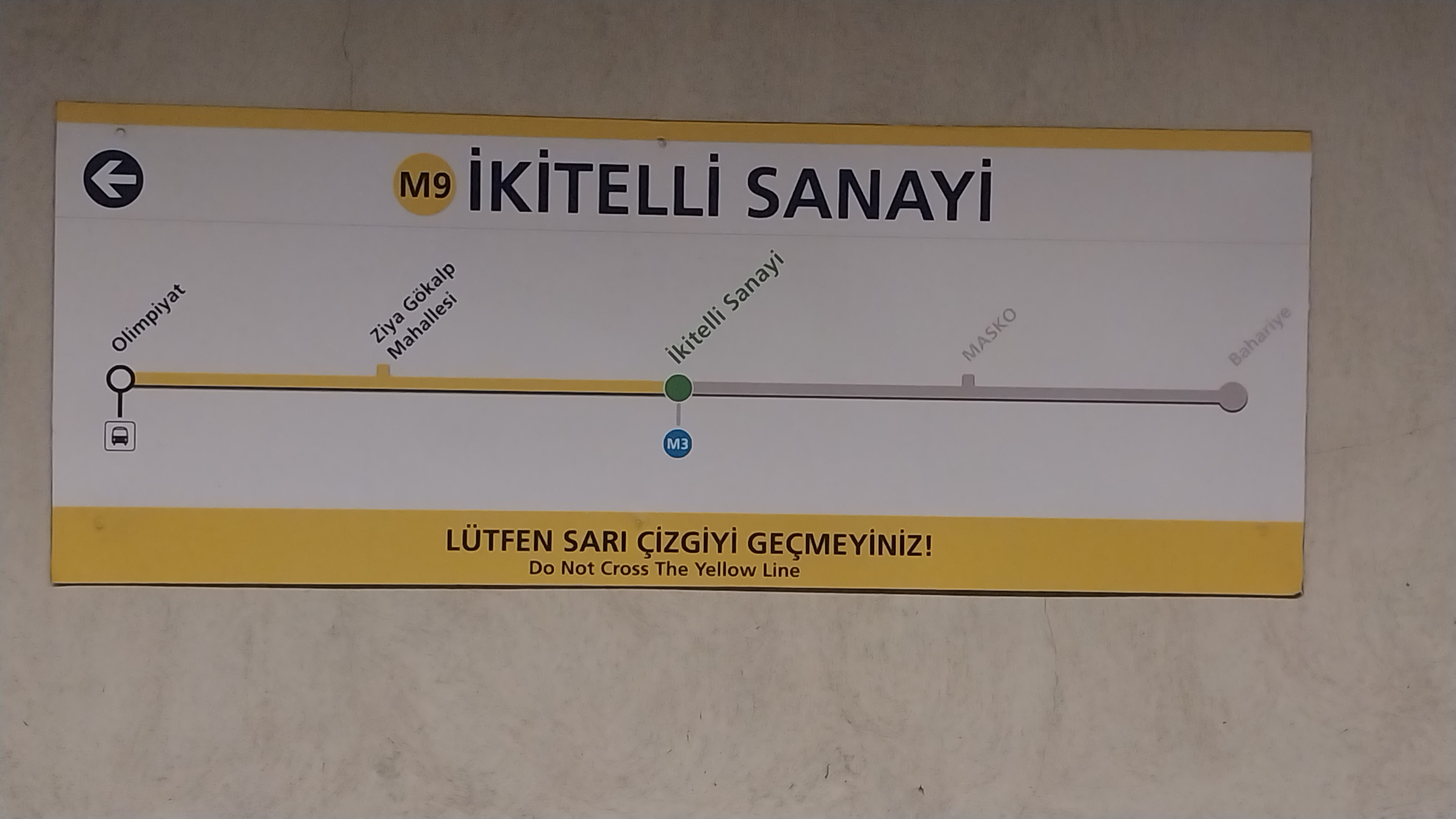
M9 route map
