= İSTOÇ station =

Station of the Istanbul Metro

İSTOÇ
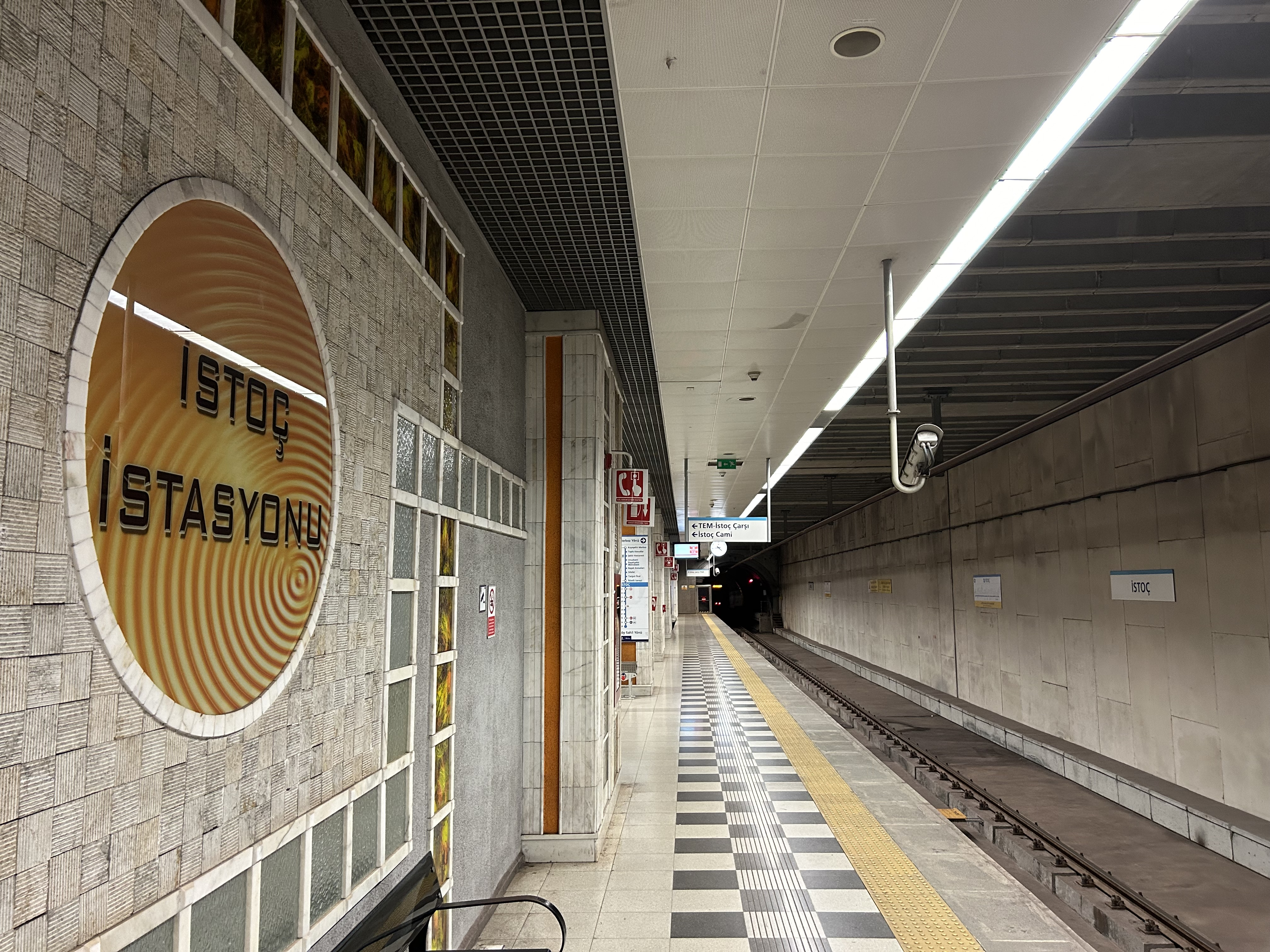
- Platform

General information
- Location: Mahmutbey Neighborhood, 2423. Sokak, 34218, İSTOÇ; Bağcılar, Istanbul; Turkey
- Coordinates: 41°3′55″N 28°49′33″E
- System: Istanbul Metro rapid transit station
- Owner: Istanbul Metropolitan Municipality
- Line: M3
- Platforms: 1 island platform
- Tracks: 2
- Connections: İETT Bus: 31Y, 76O, 78, 146A, 146B, 146K, 146M; Istanbul Minibus: Bakırköy-İstoç, Topkapı-Otogar-İstoç, Bakırköy Metro-İstoç, Sefaköy-İstoç, Eyüpsultan-İstoç, Topkapı-Bağcılar-İstoç, İstoç-Bağcılar Devlet Hastanesi, Güzeltepe-İstoç, Bakırköy-İkitelli, Topkapı-Kayaşehir, Topkapı-Deprem Konutları, İkitelli Organize Sanayi-Deprem Konutları

Construction
- Structure type: Underground
- Parking: No
- Cycle facilities: Yes
- Accessible: Yes

History
- Opened: 14 June 2013; 13 years ago
- Electrified: 1,500 V DC Overhead line

Services
Preceding station	Istanbul Metro	Following station
İkitelli Sanayi towards Kayaşehir Merkez	M3 Line	Mahmutbey towards Bakırköy Sahil
Location

İSTOÇ is an underground rapid transit station on the M3 line of the Istanbul Metro. It is located in the northwestern tip of Bağcılar under the Istanbul Wholesalers Market (Turkish: İstanbul Toptancılar Çarşısı, shortened as İSTOÇ). Opened on 14 June 2013 it has an island platform serviced by two tracks.

== Layout ==
Northbound	← toward Kayaşehir Merkez (İkitelli Sanayi)
Island platform, doors will open on the left
Southbound	toward Bakırköy Sahil (Mahmutbey) →

== Operation information ==
The line operates between 06:00 and 00:00 and train frequency is 7 minutes at peak hours and 10 minutes at all other times. The line has no night service.

== Gallery ==
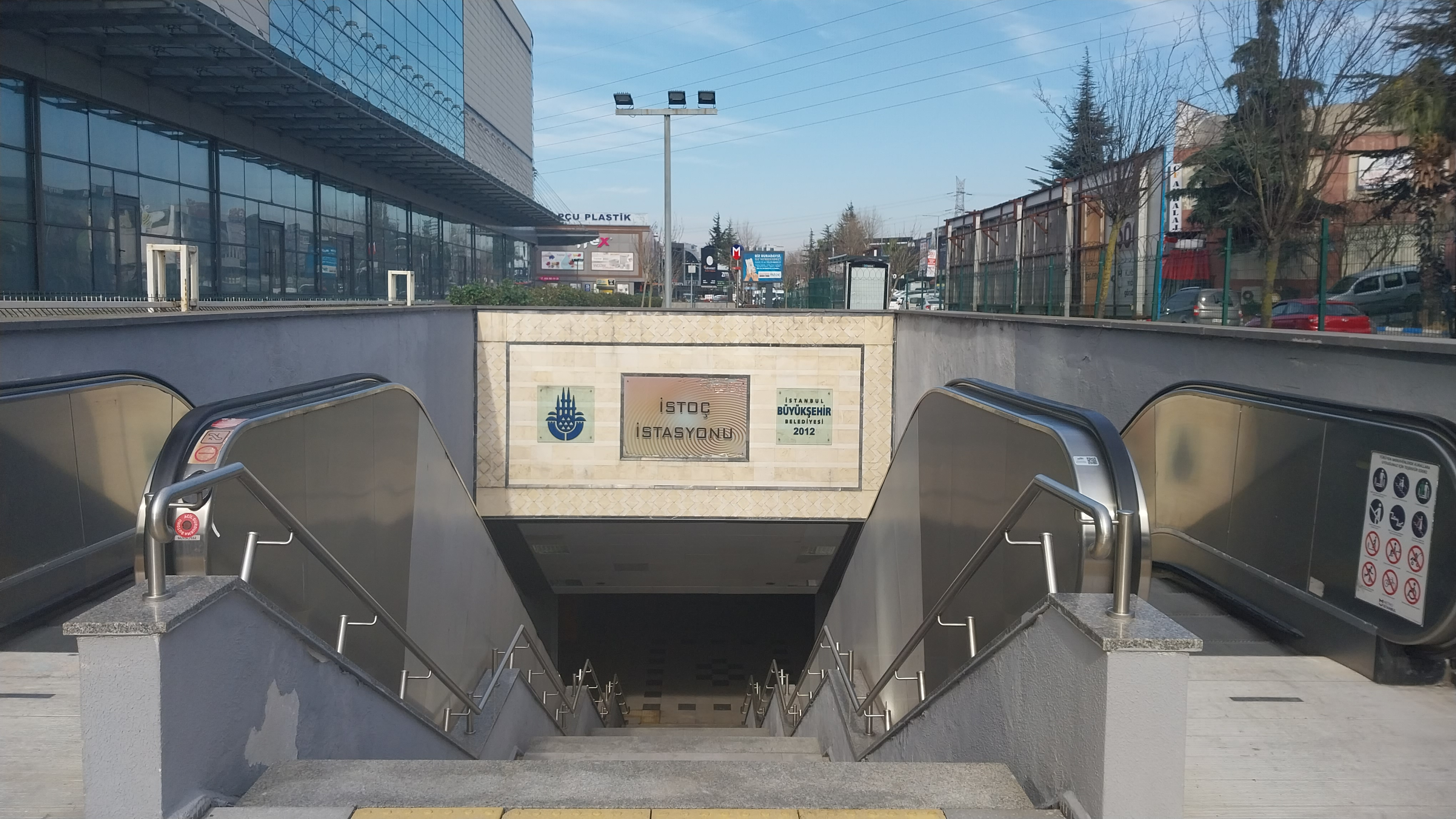
Entrance

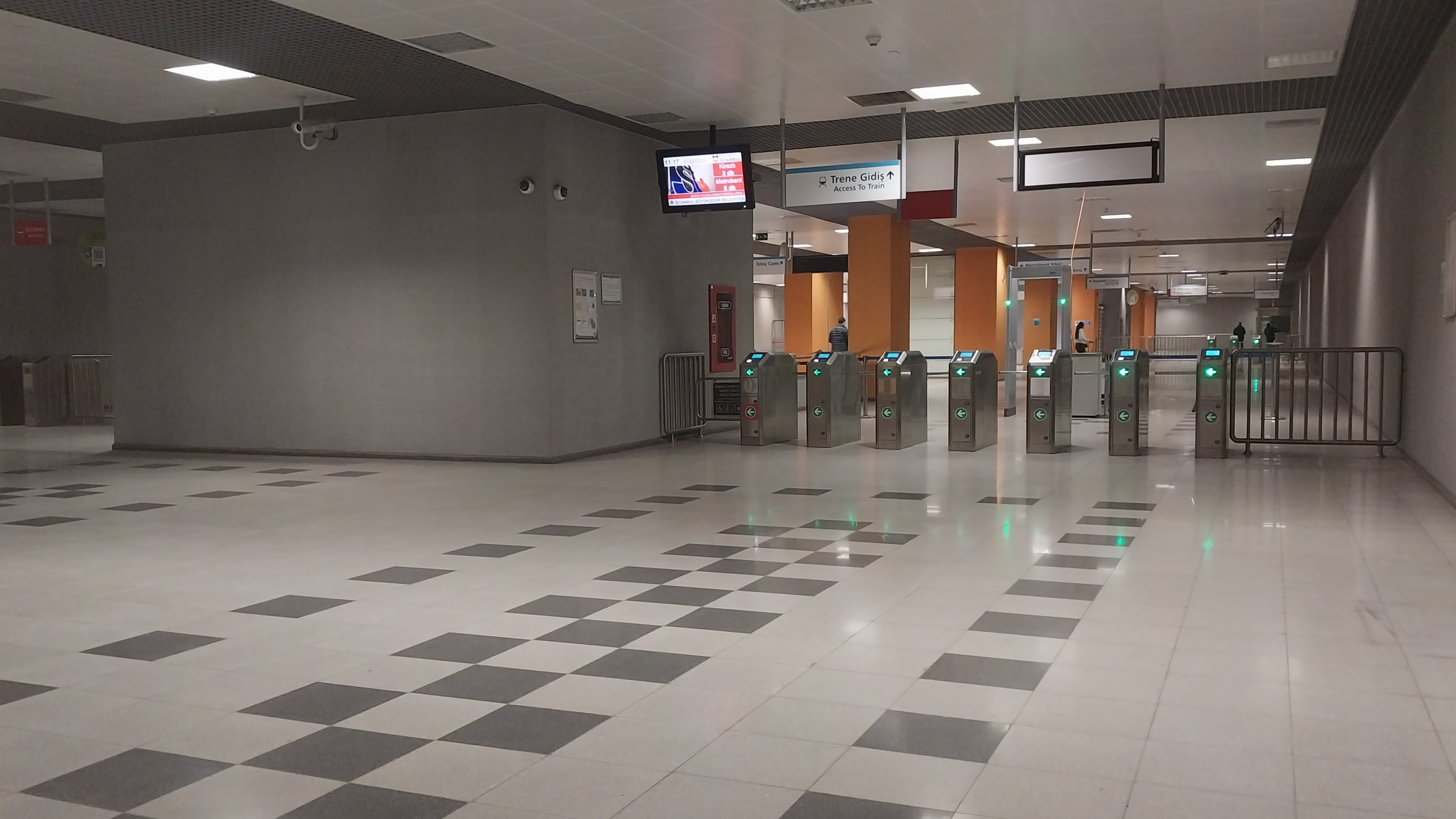
Ticket hall

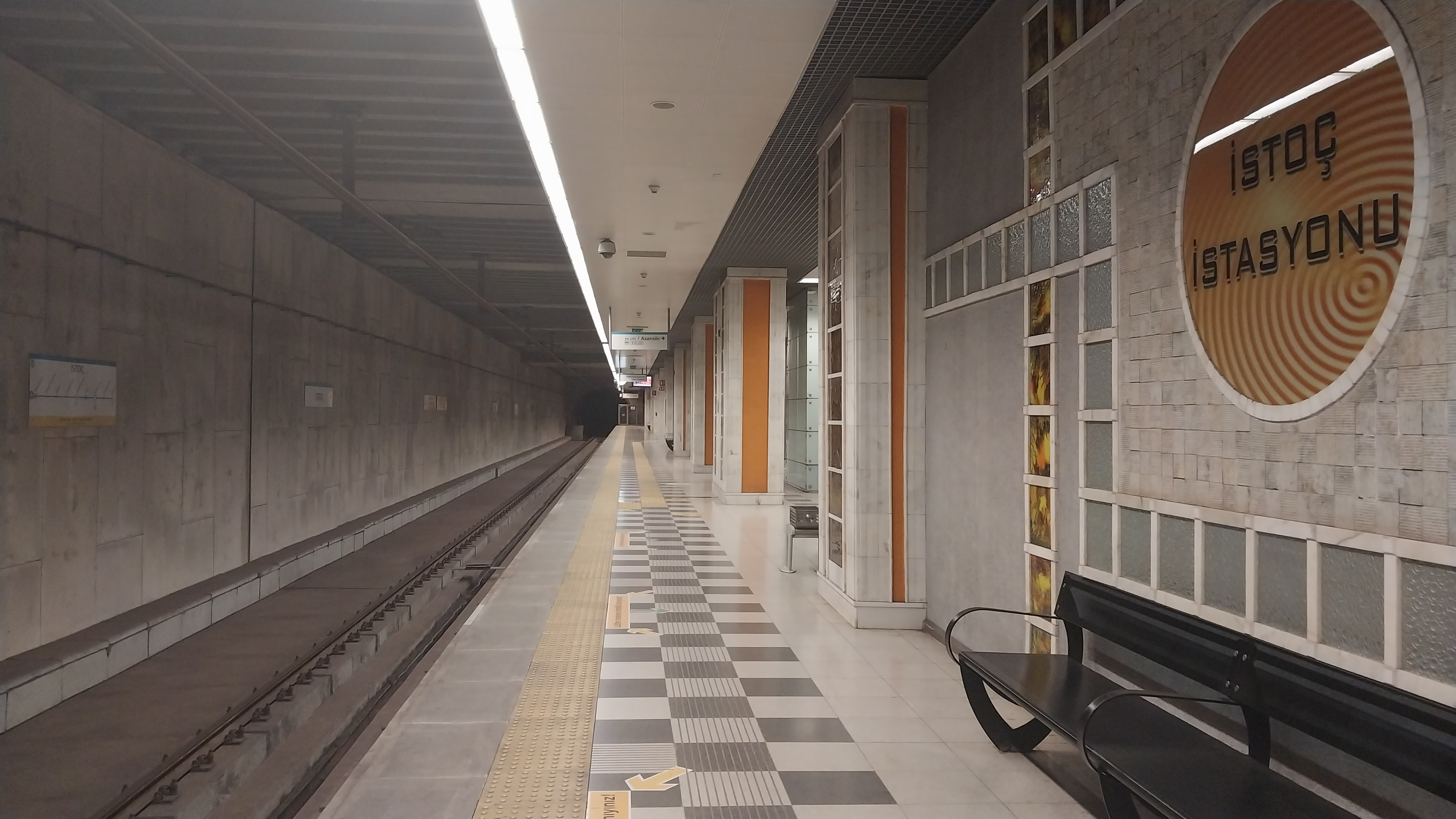
Platform
