= MASKO station =

Station of the Istanbul Metro

MASKO
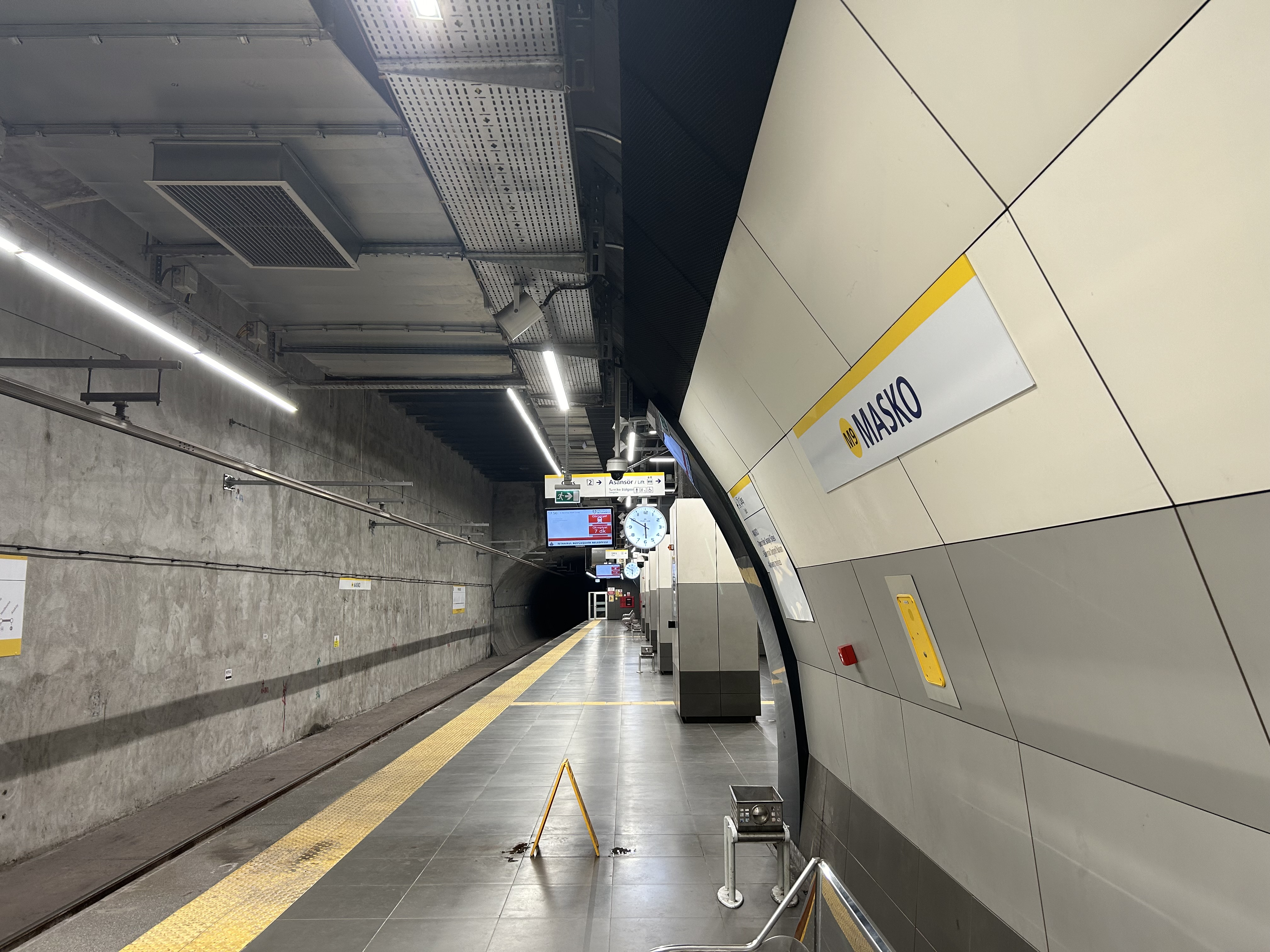
- Platform

General information
- Location: Ziya Gökalp Neighborhood, Süleyman Demirel Boulevard, 34490; Başakşehir, Istanbul; Turkey
- Coordinates: 41°3′51″N 28°48′15″E
- System: Istanbul Metro rapid transit station
- Owner: Istanbul Metropolitan Municipality
- Operator: Istanbul Metro
- Line: M9
- Platforms: 1 Island platform
- Tracks: 2
- Connections: İETT Bus: 76A, 76O, 78B, 78G, 82S, 89F, 98H, 142E, 144M, 146A, 146K, 146M, 146T, H-3, MK31; Istanbul Minibus: Sefaköy-İstoç, Topkapı-İkitelli Organize Sanayi, Yüzyıl-Tahtakale, Otogar-İkitelli Organize Sanayi, Şirinevler-Kayaşehir

Construction
- Structure type: Underground
- Parking: No
- Cycle facilities: Yes
- Accessible: Yes

History
- Opened: 29 May 2021 (5 years ago)
- Electrified: 1,500 V DC Overhead line

Services
Preceding station	Istanbul Metro	Following station
İkitelli Sanayi towards Olimpiyat	M9 Line	Bahariye towards Ataköy
Location

MASKO is an underground station on the M9 line of the Istanbul Metro. It is located on Süleyman Demirel Boulevard in the Ziya Gökalp neighborhood of Başakşehir. It was opened on 29 May 2021.

== Station layout ==
Platform level	Northbound	← toward Olimpiyat (İkitelli Sanayi)
Platform level	Island platform, doors will open on the left
Platform level	Southbound	toward Ataköy (Bahariye) →

== Operation information ==
The line operates between 06:00 and 00:00 and train frequency is 9 minutes. The line has no night service.

== Gallery ==
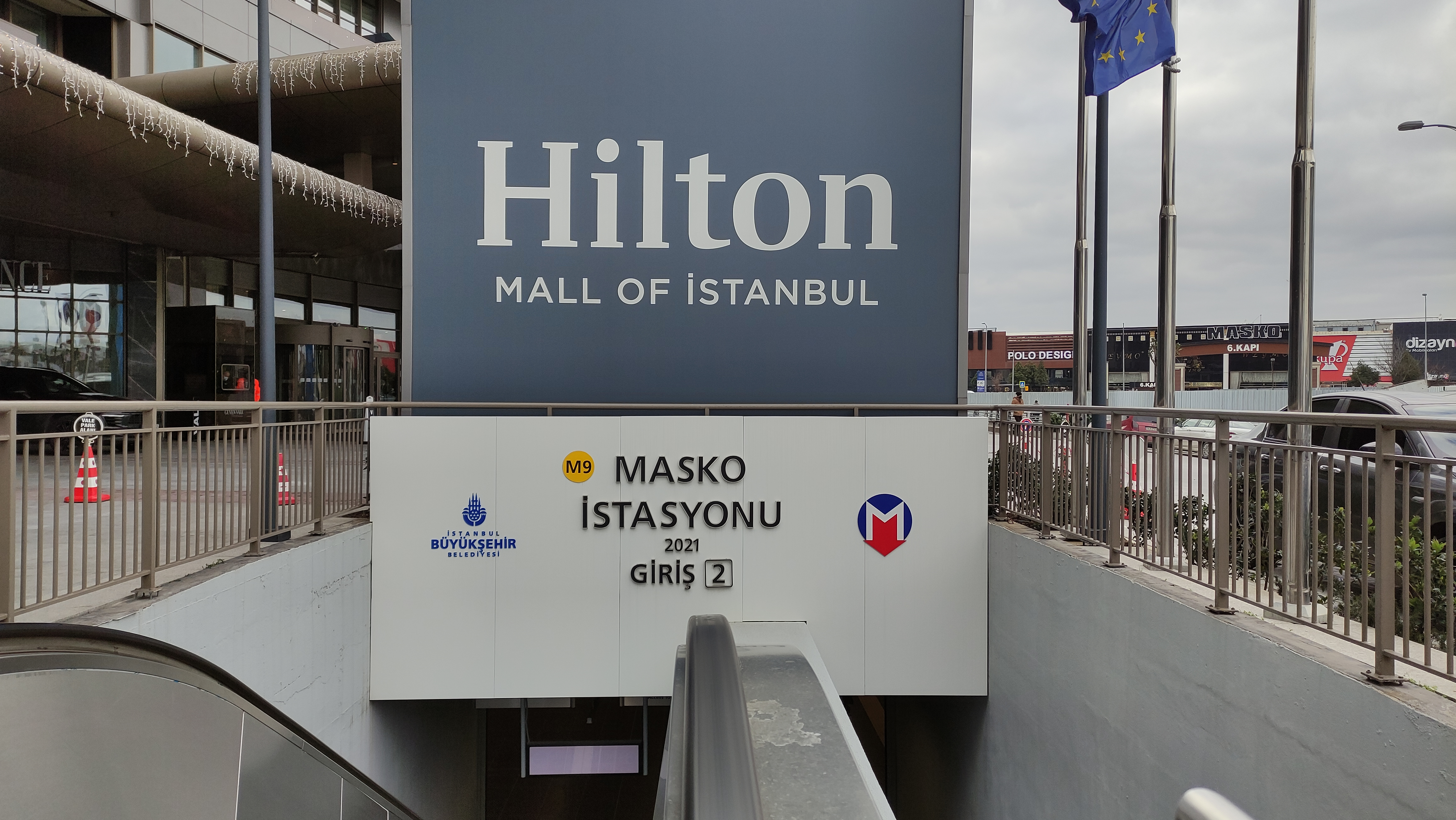
Entrance 2

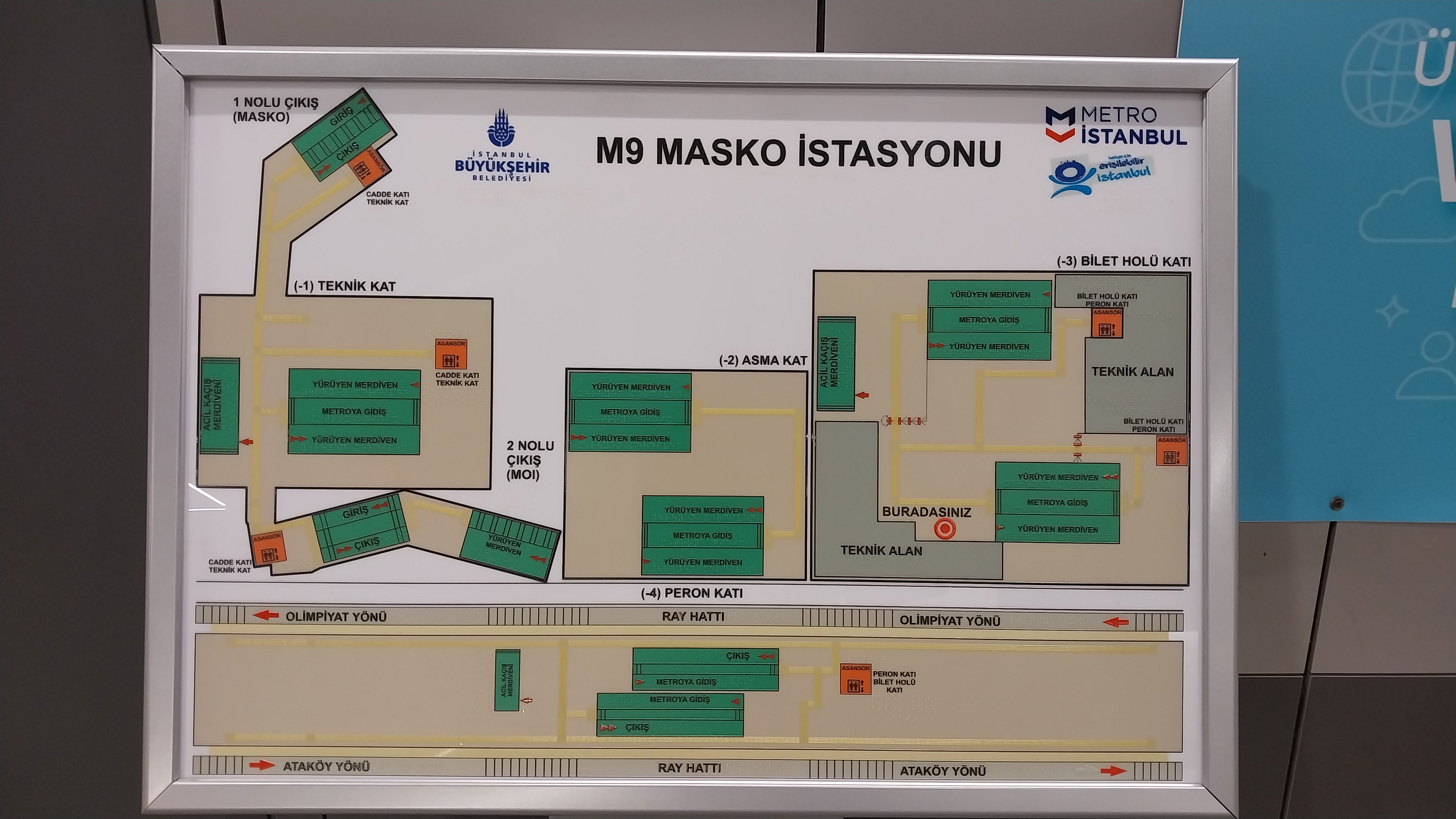
Station diagram

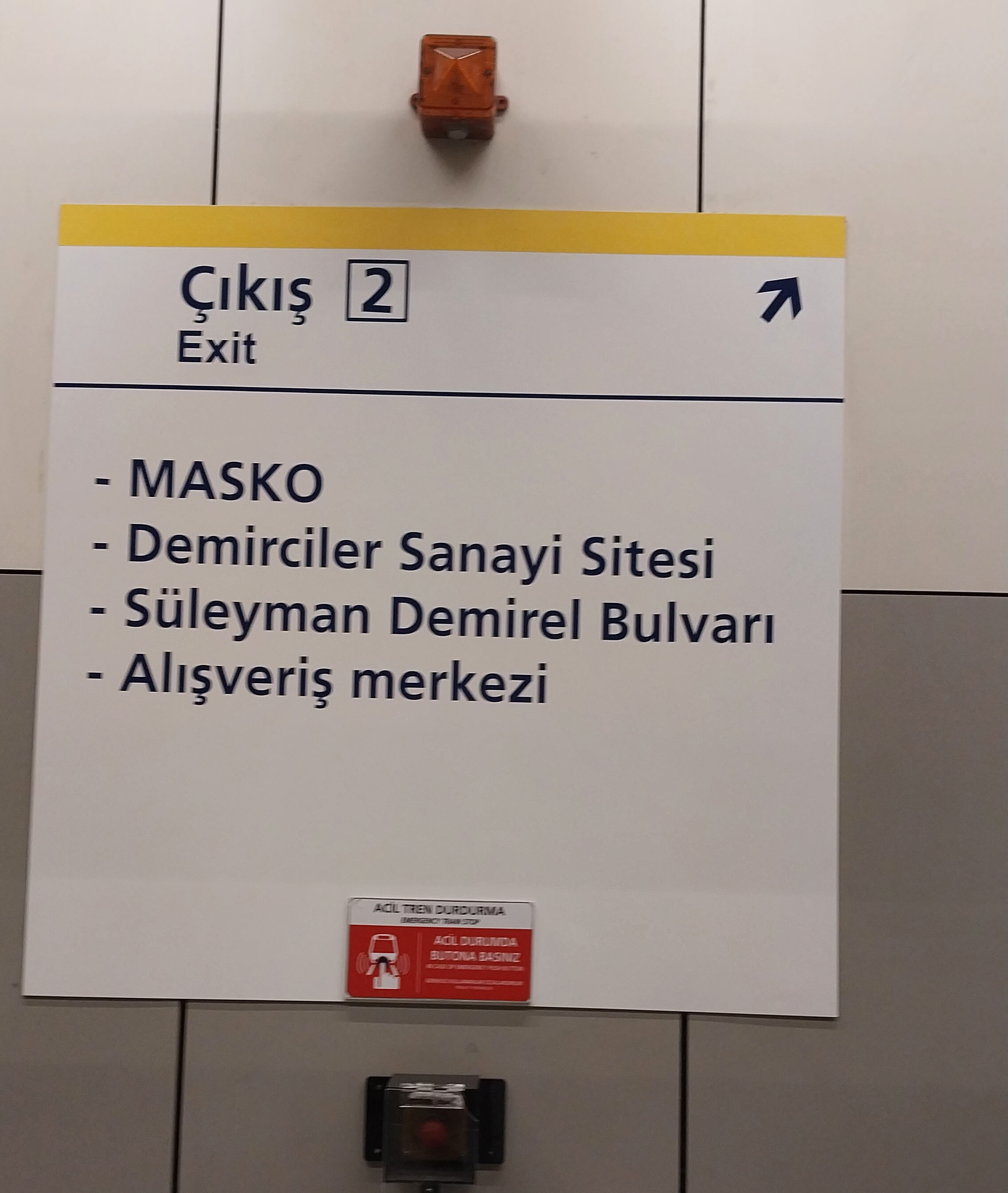
Exit sign

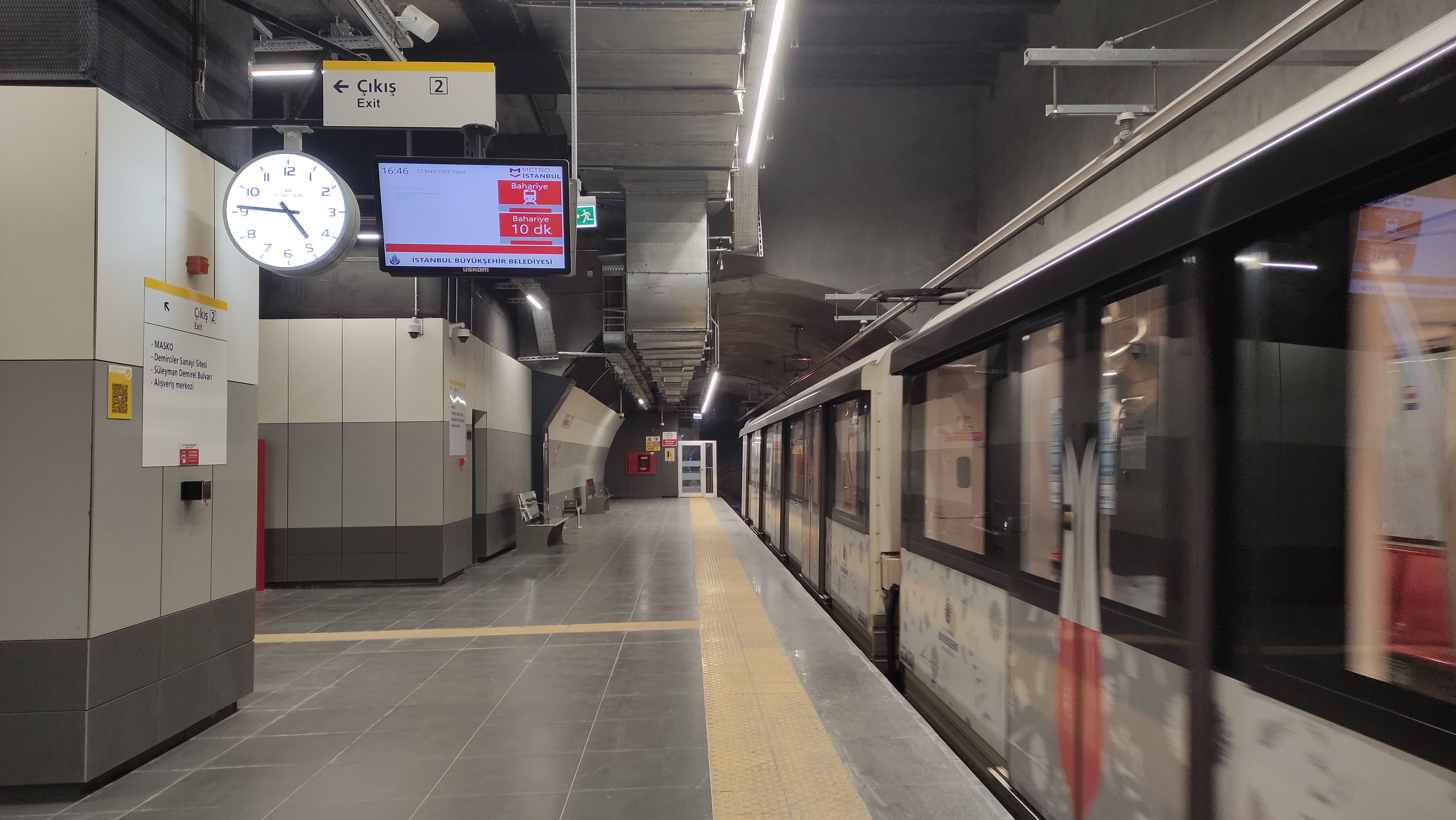
Train at the platform

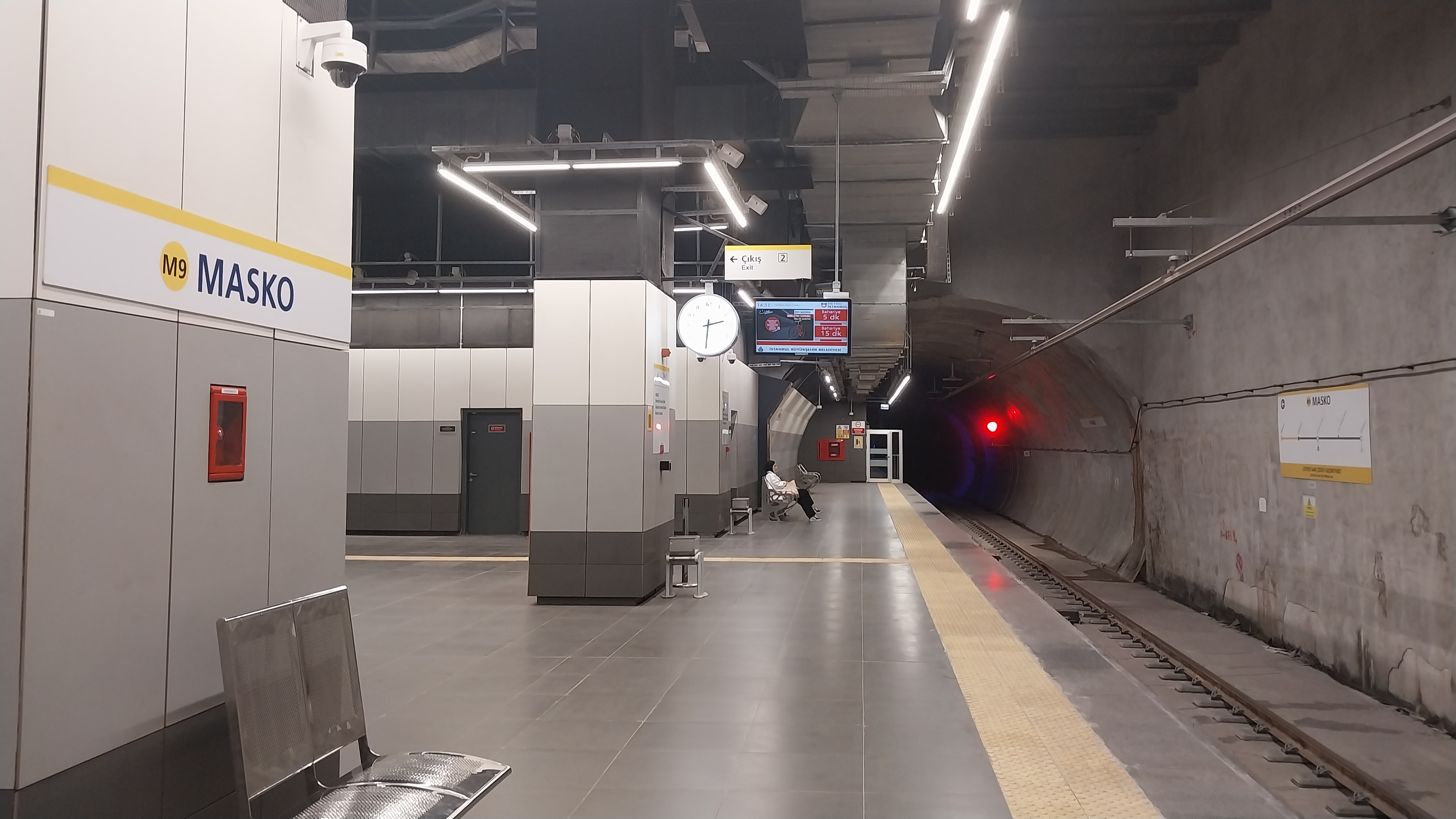
Platform
