= Istanbul Central Business District =

Central Business District of Istanbul, Turkey

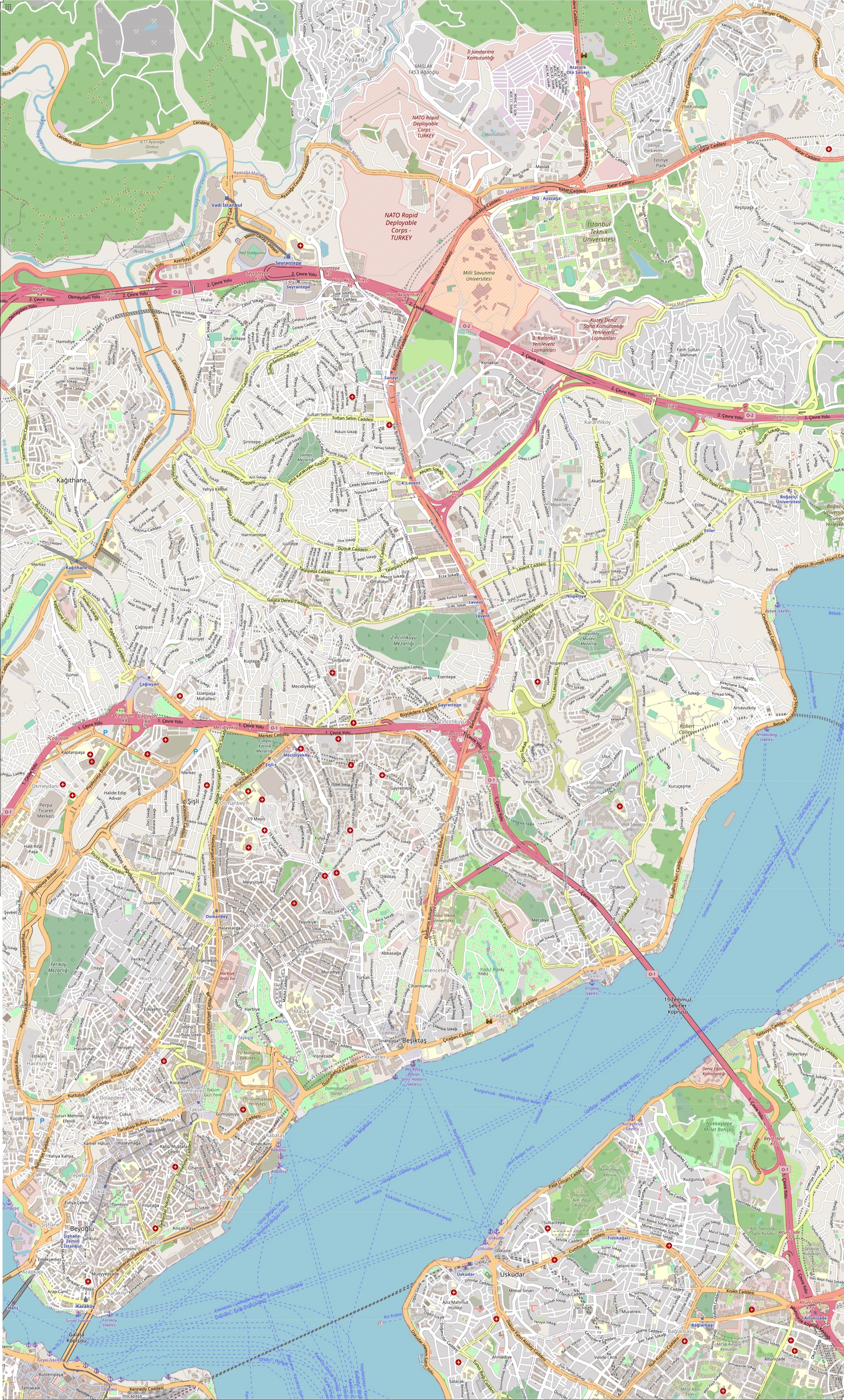
Istanbul CBD, Beyoğlu and Golden Horn, key business and shopping centers, universities, and selected metro stations and landmarks. Bold text=neighborhood, ⛴️=ferry pier, Fu=funicular station, M=metro station, T= tram stop, 🔧=under construction

Istanbul's Central Business District is a 7-km-long north–south corridor of modern areas mostly along Barbaros Boulevard and Büyükdere Avenue. As of late 2021, 33% of the Class A office space in the metropolitan area was located in the CBD, of which about 790,000 sqm in Maslak, 690,000 sqm in Levent, 500,000 sqm in Zincirlikuyu/Esentepe/Gayrettepe and 100,000 sqm in Etiler.

The Istanbul Metro's Line 2 serves the CBD's main north-south corridor, with Line 6 and Line 7 providing east-west service. In addition, Line 7 is to be extended southward from Şişli—Mecidiyeköy station to Beşiktaş ferry station.

The historic city center is in Fatih and contains historic sites, the Grand Bazaar and adjacent wholesale/retail districts, but is not a modern "central business district" in that it does not have modern retail formats, dense residential and hotel towers, etc.

These can be found in the following edge cities with concentrations of office space, shopping malls, residential towers, entertainment and educational facilities, hospitals, etc.

From south to north, they are:

Symbols	hospital metro line military base	museum/monument office/ residential tower pier	planned or under construction shopping mall/area	stadium university	N neighborhood D district

WEST						EAST
N O R T H						İstinye Park; N Maslak, D Sarıyer
N O R T H	Skyland	Vadistanbul; Vadistanbul; Radisson Collection; Rams Park; Galatasaray FC; N Ayazağa D Sarıyer	Seyrantepe	3rd Corps/NATO; Sanayi	National Defense	İtü Ayazağa; Hilton Maslak; Istanbul Technical
	Kağıthane; Merkez Kağıthane; AXİS AVM			4. Levent; Sheraton Levent; Istanbul Sapphire; N Emniyet evleri D Kağıthane (W side); N Konaklar D Beşiktaş (E side)	Le Meridien Etiler	Etiler; Boğaziçi Üniv. Boğaziçi
	Çağlayan			Kanyon; Özdilek Park; Wyndham Grand; Levent; Hyatt Centric; Metrocity; N Esentepe D Şişli (W side); N Levent D Beşiktaş (E side)	Nispetiye; Four Seasons Res. Akmerkez; N Nispetiye D Beşiktaş	
	Taşçioğlu	Trump Towers; Şişli Mecidiyeköy; İstanbul Cevahir; Marriott Hotels; Radisson Blu; N Mecidiyeköy D Şişli	Astoria; Fairmount; Kempinski Res. Profilo	Gayrettepe; Gayrettepe; Zorlu Center; Mövenpick; Raffles; N Esentepe, Levazım, Balmumcu D Beşiktaş		
	N Bomonti	N Fulya	N Otim	Fulya		
		Osmanbey; Westin	N Nişantaşı; American Hospital; St. Regis; Park Hyatt	Yıldız Technical; Yıldız; Conrad; N Yıldız D Beşiktaş		Mandarin Oriental
			Congress Center; Hilton; Grand Hyatt; Intercontinental; Divan; N Harbiye D Şişli	N Maçka D Şişli		
S O U T H			Intercontinental; Marmara; Taksim Gezi Park; Taksim Square; Taksim	Four Seasons; Beşiktaş; Shangri-La; Swissotel; Dolmabahce Palace	Çırağan Palace; Kempinski; N Yıldız D Beşiktaş	
S O U T H			İstiklal Avenue	Kabataş		
S O U T H		Şişhane; Beyoğlu (Tünel); Galata Tower; N Berketzade; D Beyoğlu (Pera)	Fındıklı; Galataport; Modern Art; Tophane			
S O U T H		Karaköy (Tünel); Karaköy Pier	Peninsula Hotel; Novotel; JW Marriott			

== Gallery ==
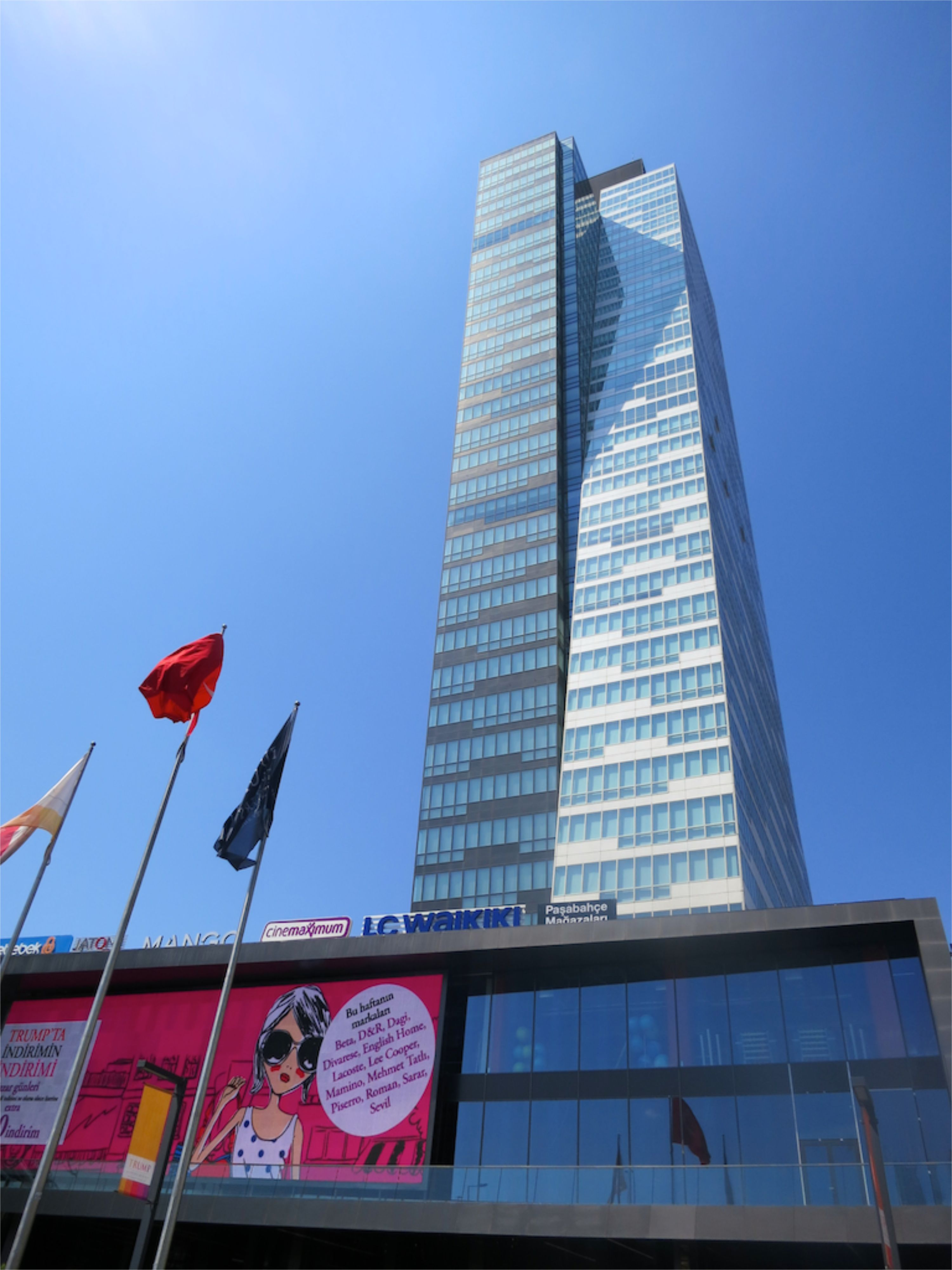
Trump Towers Istanbul, Mecidiyeköy

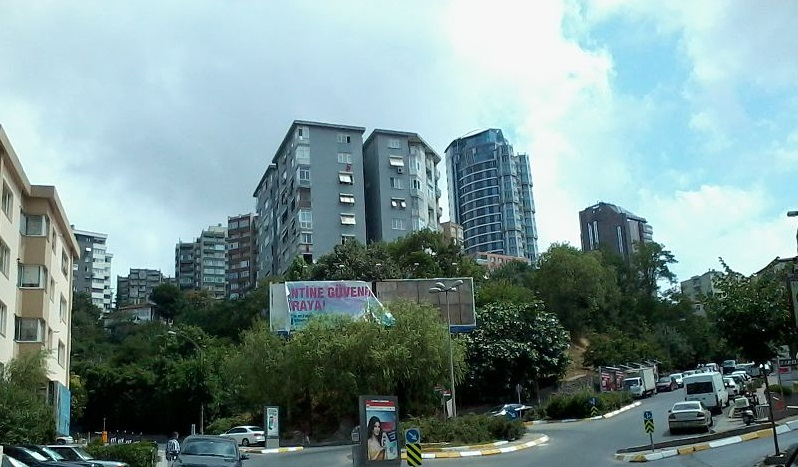
Gayreteppe streetscape

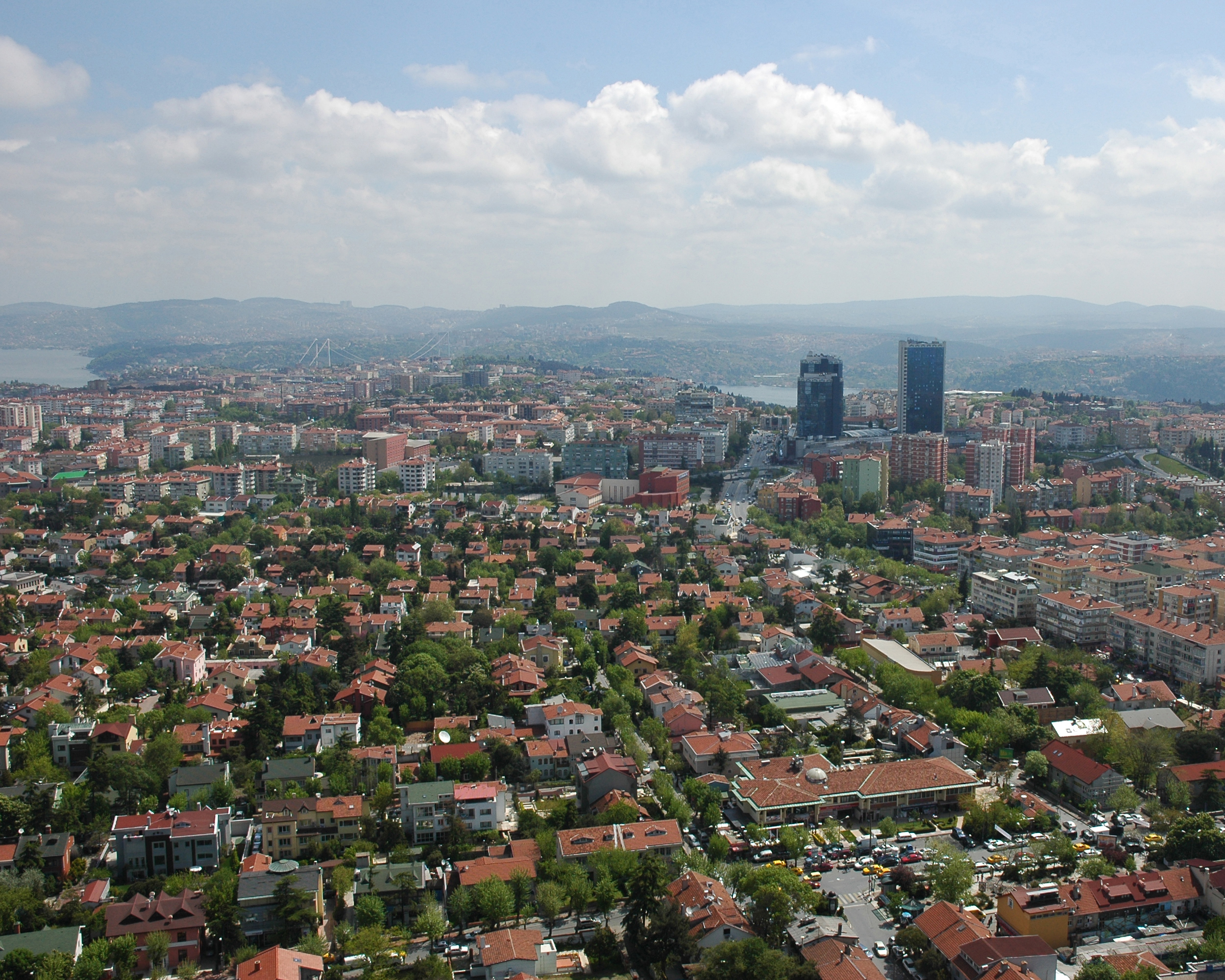
Etiler seen from Metrocity

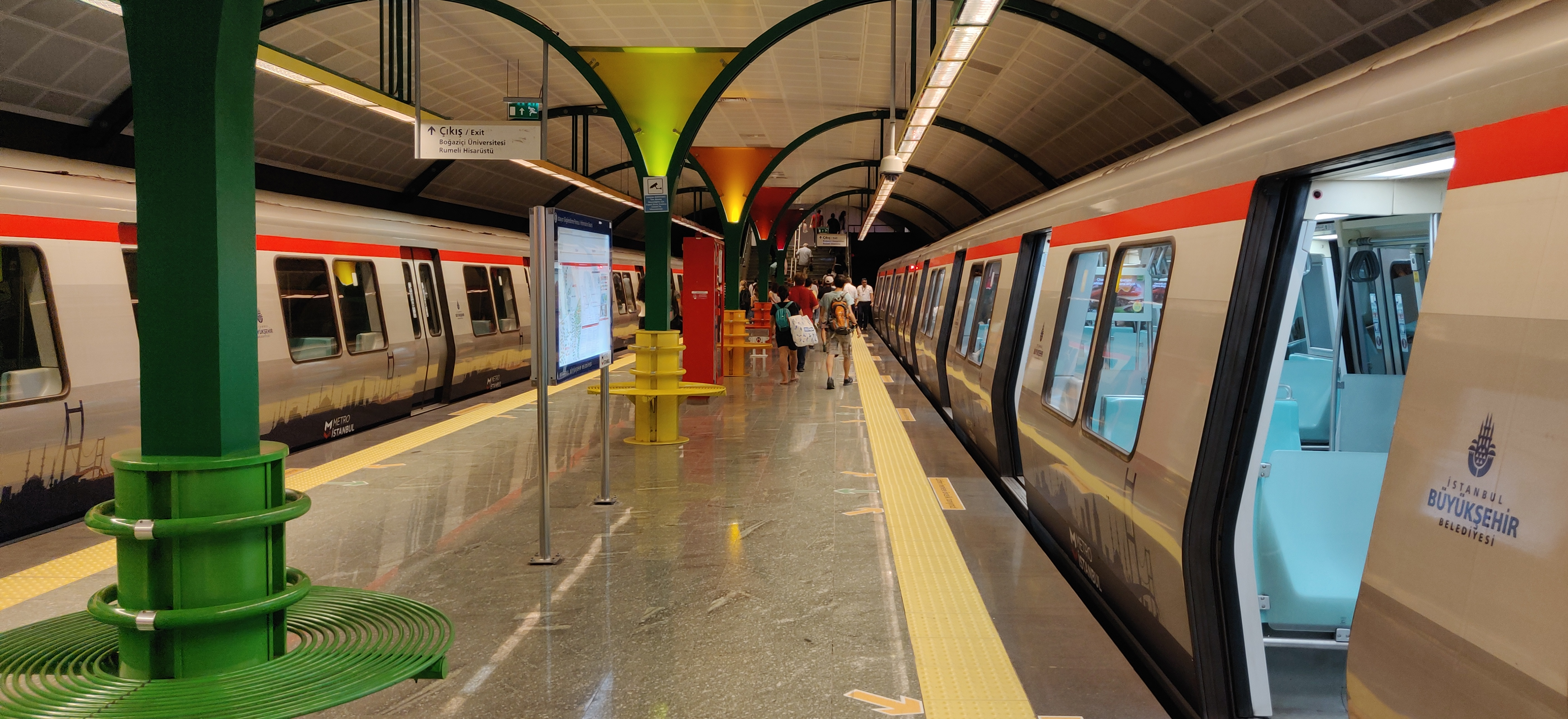
New Boğaziçi University metro station

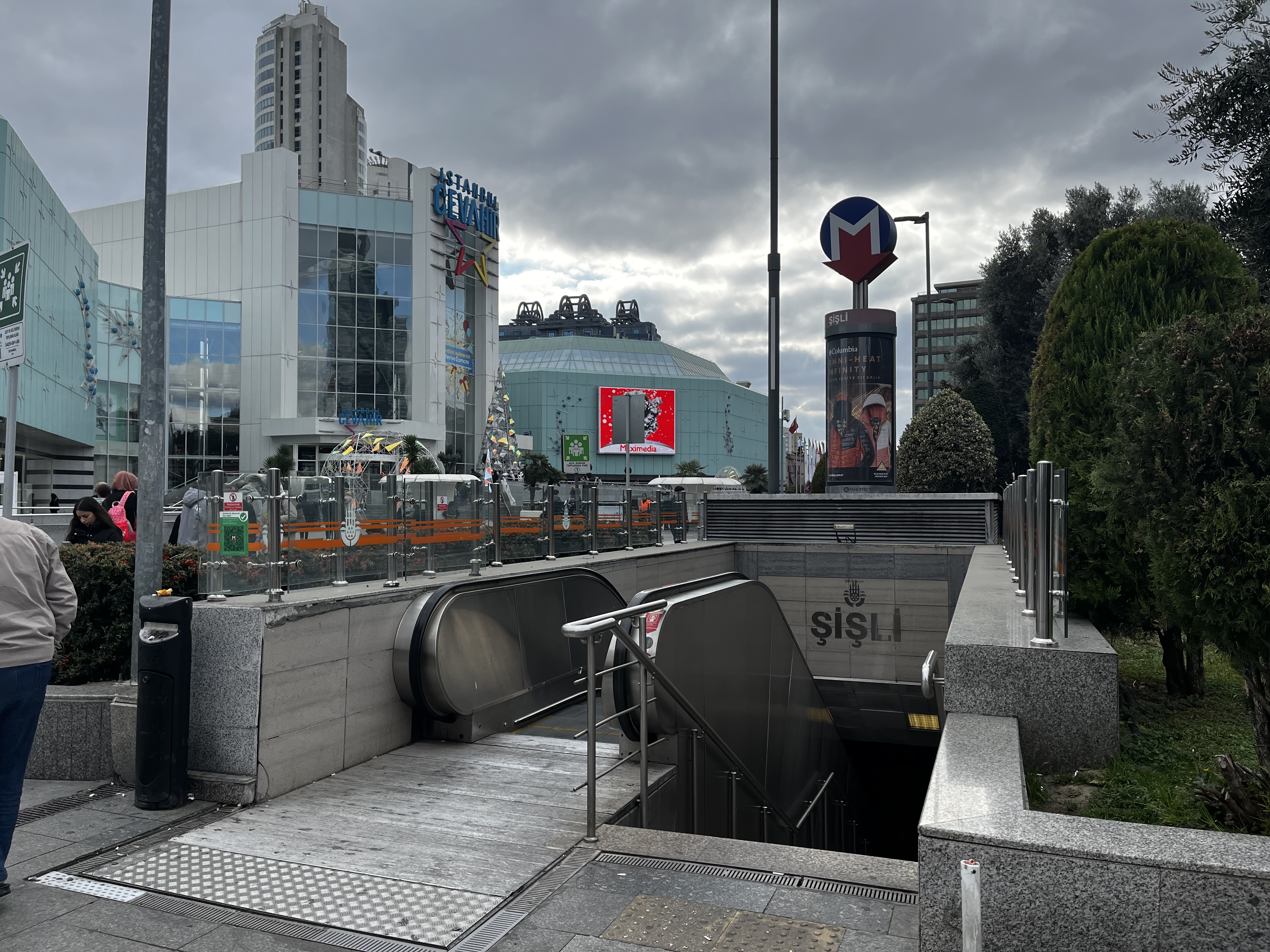
Above Şişli station

Cevahir mall

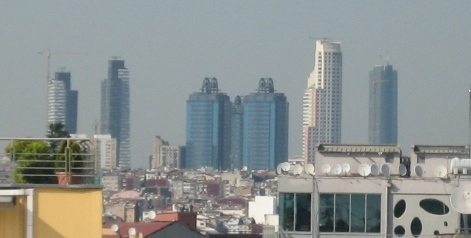
Bomonti skyline

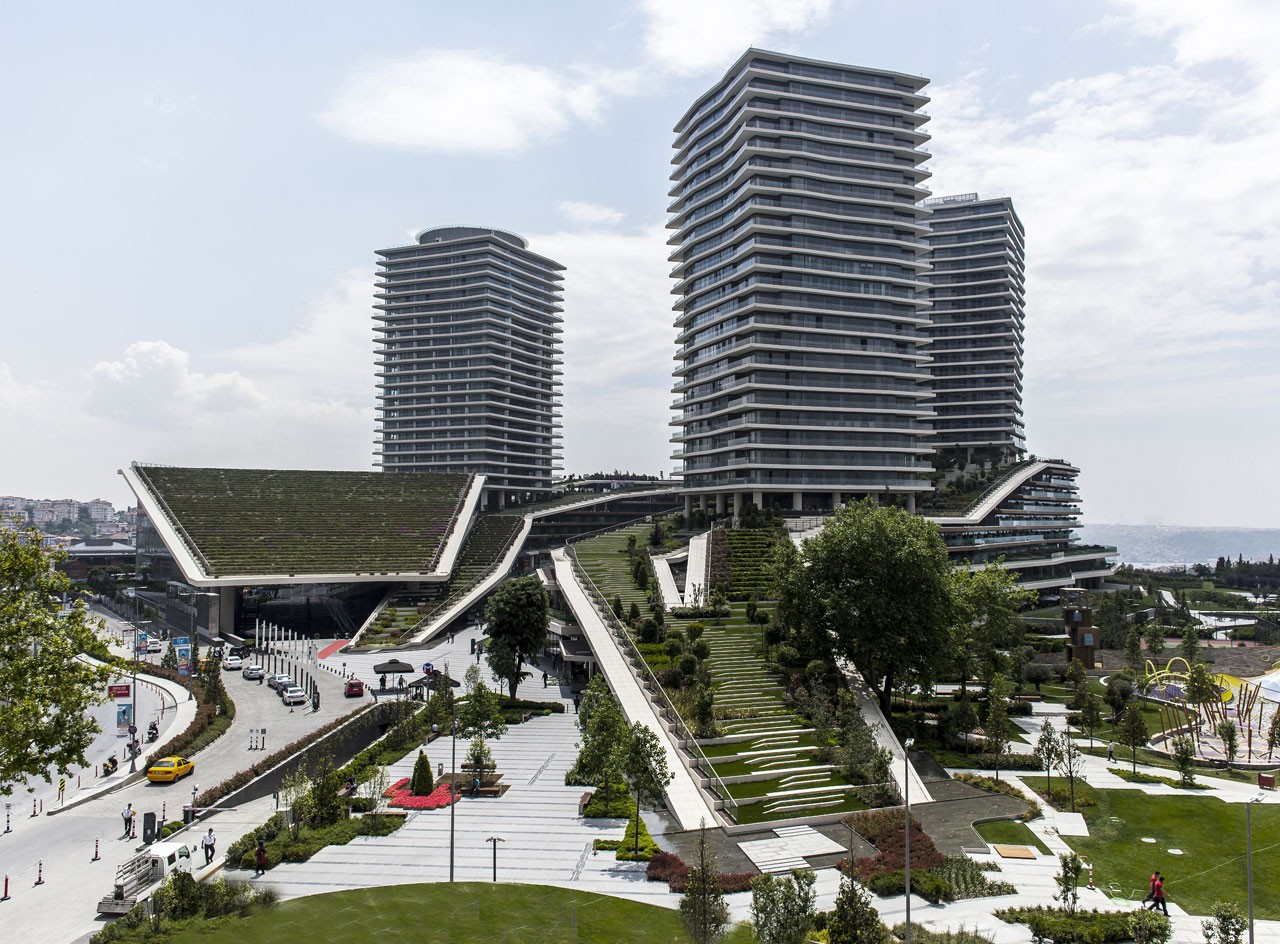
Zorlu Center complex

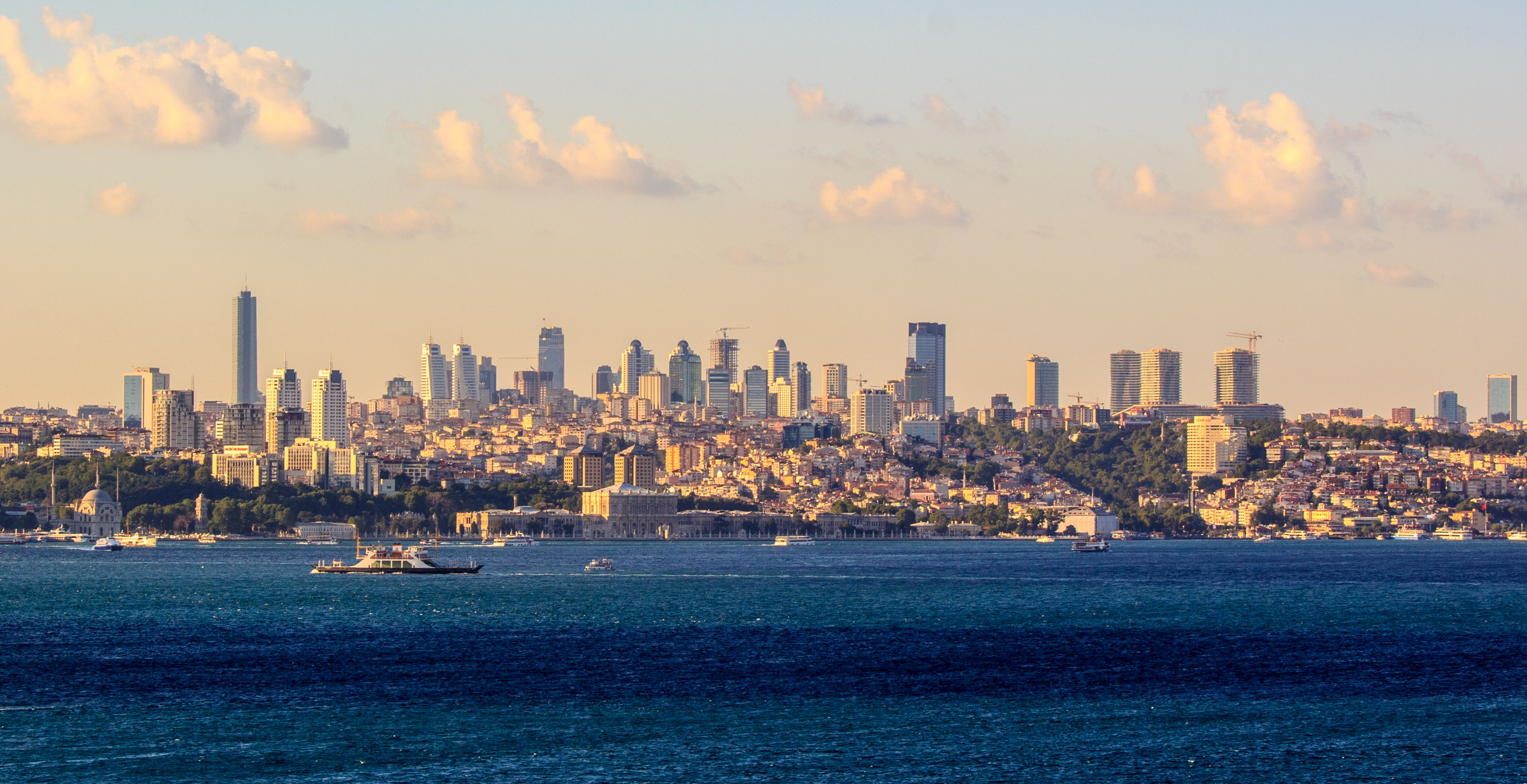
Levent skyline seen from the Bosphorus

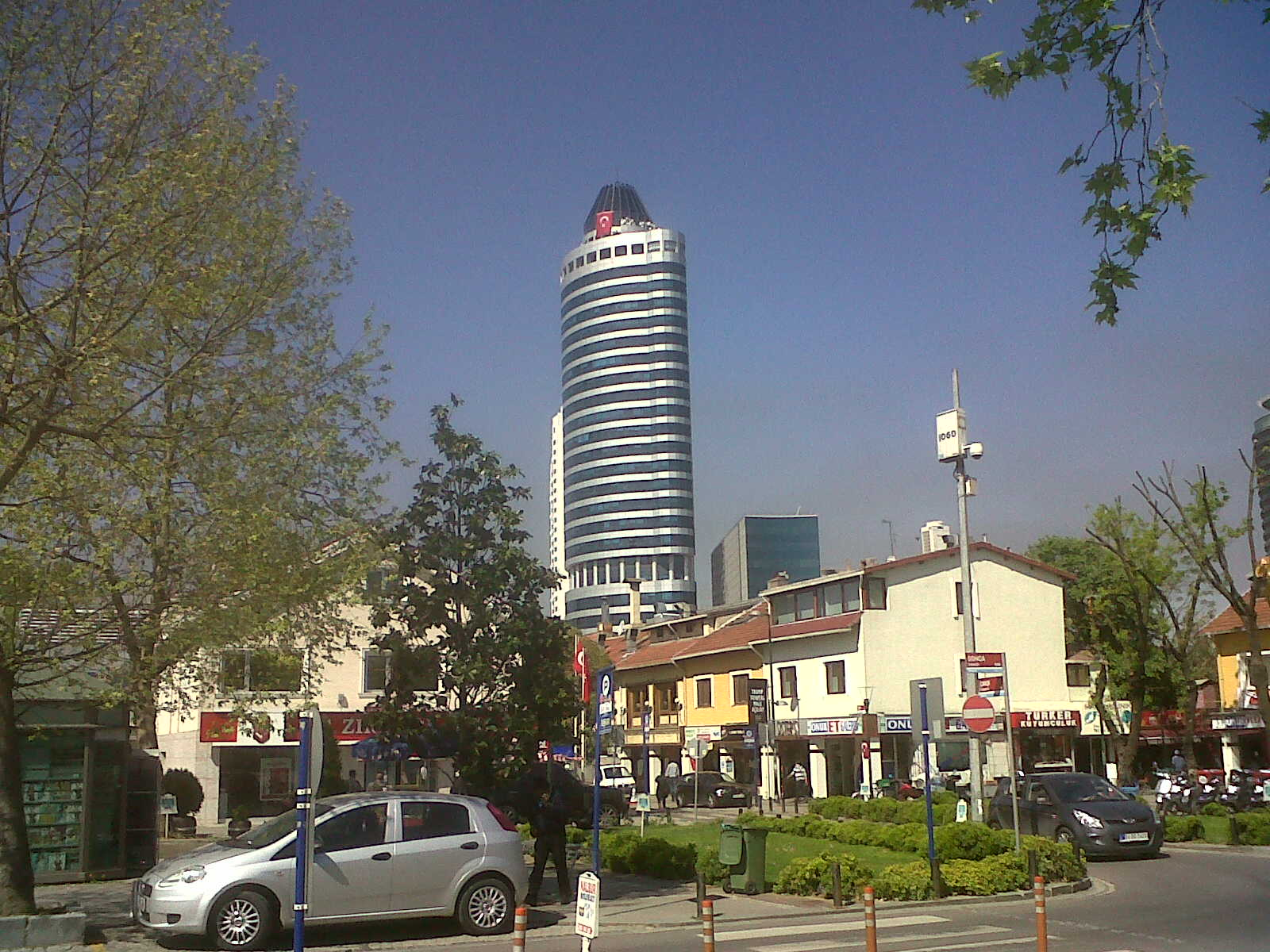
Metrocity tower

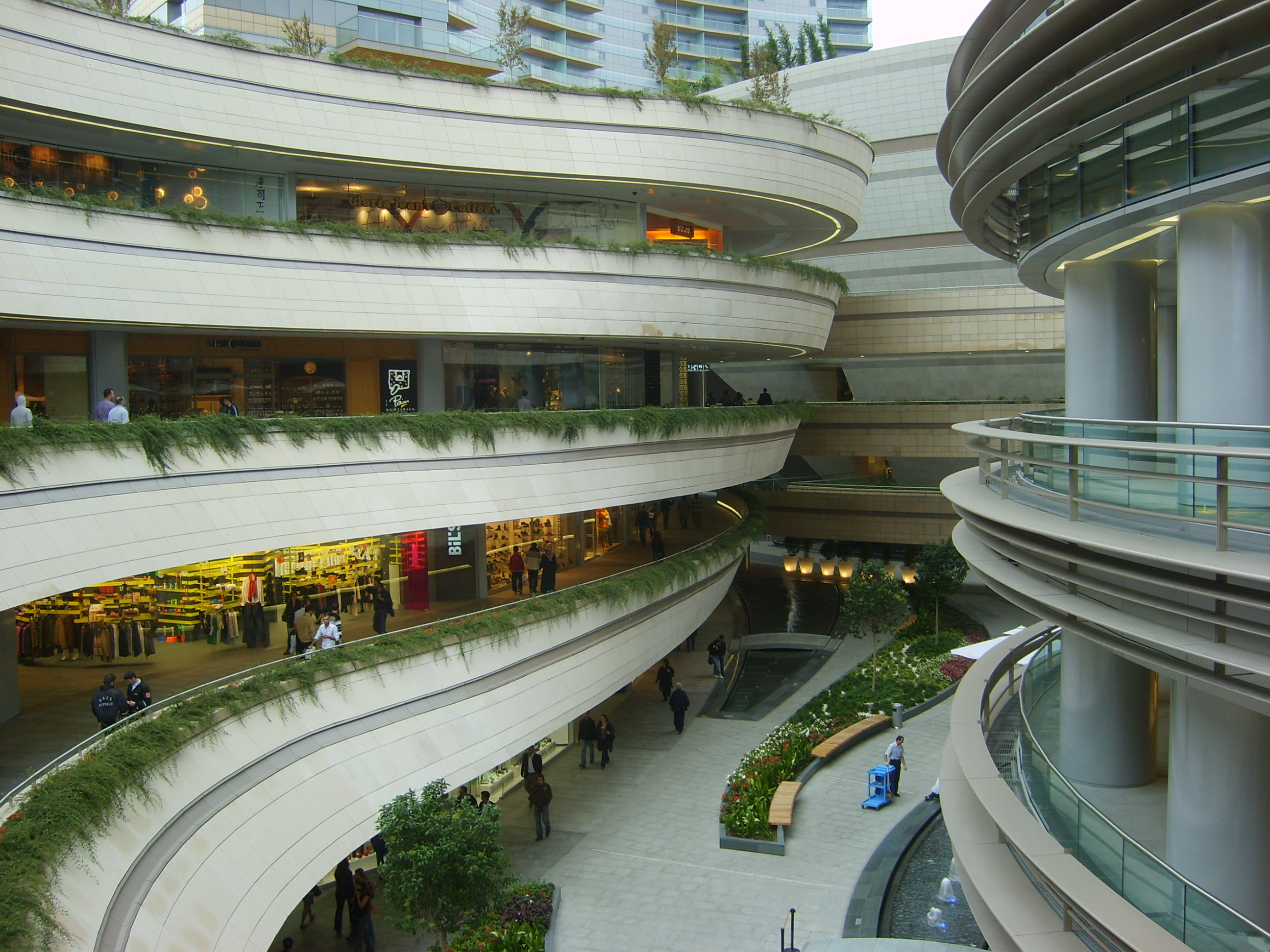
Kanyon mall

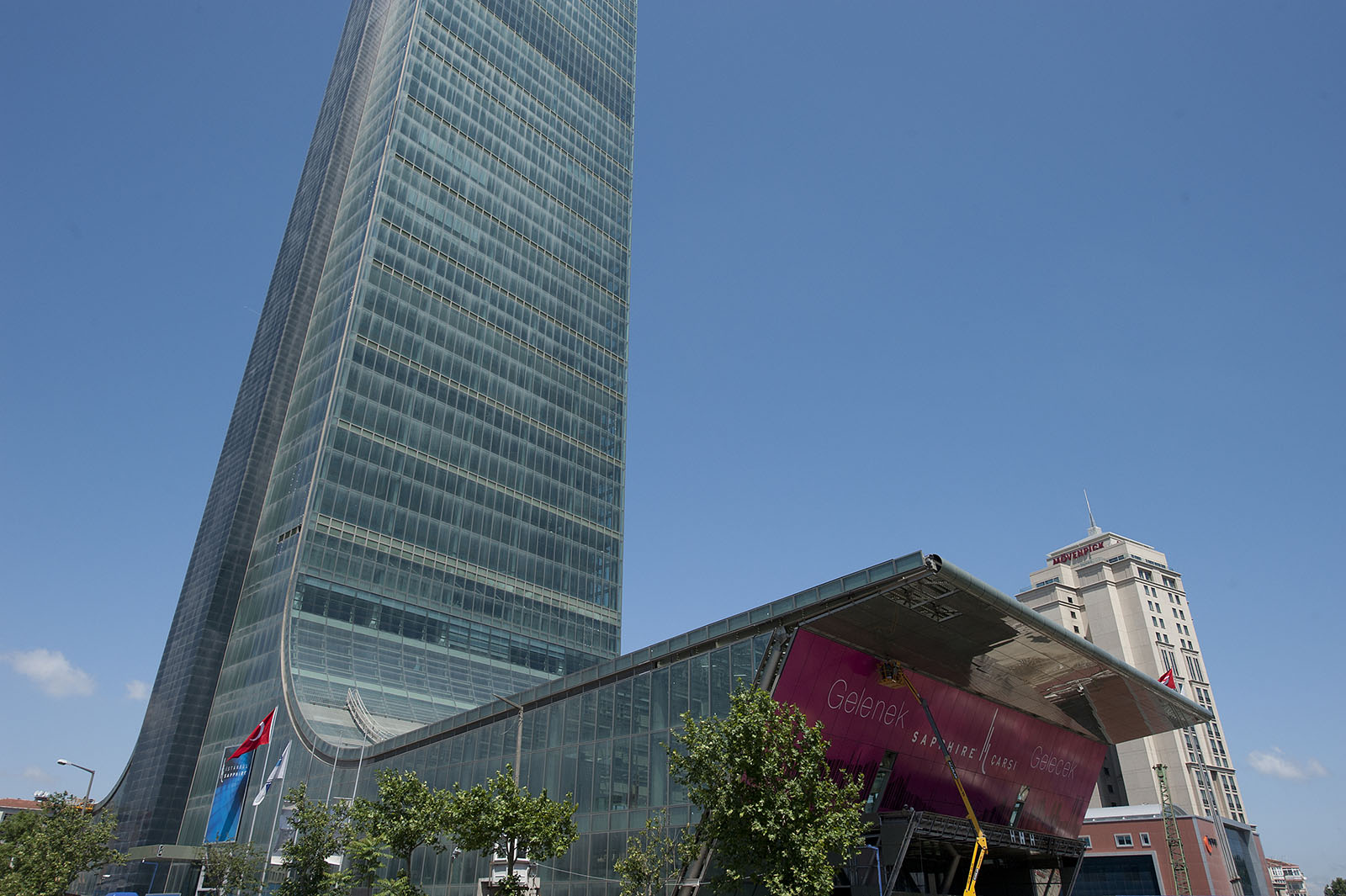
Istanbul Sapphire

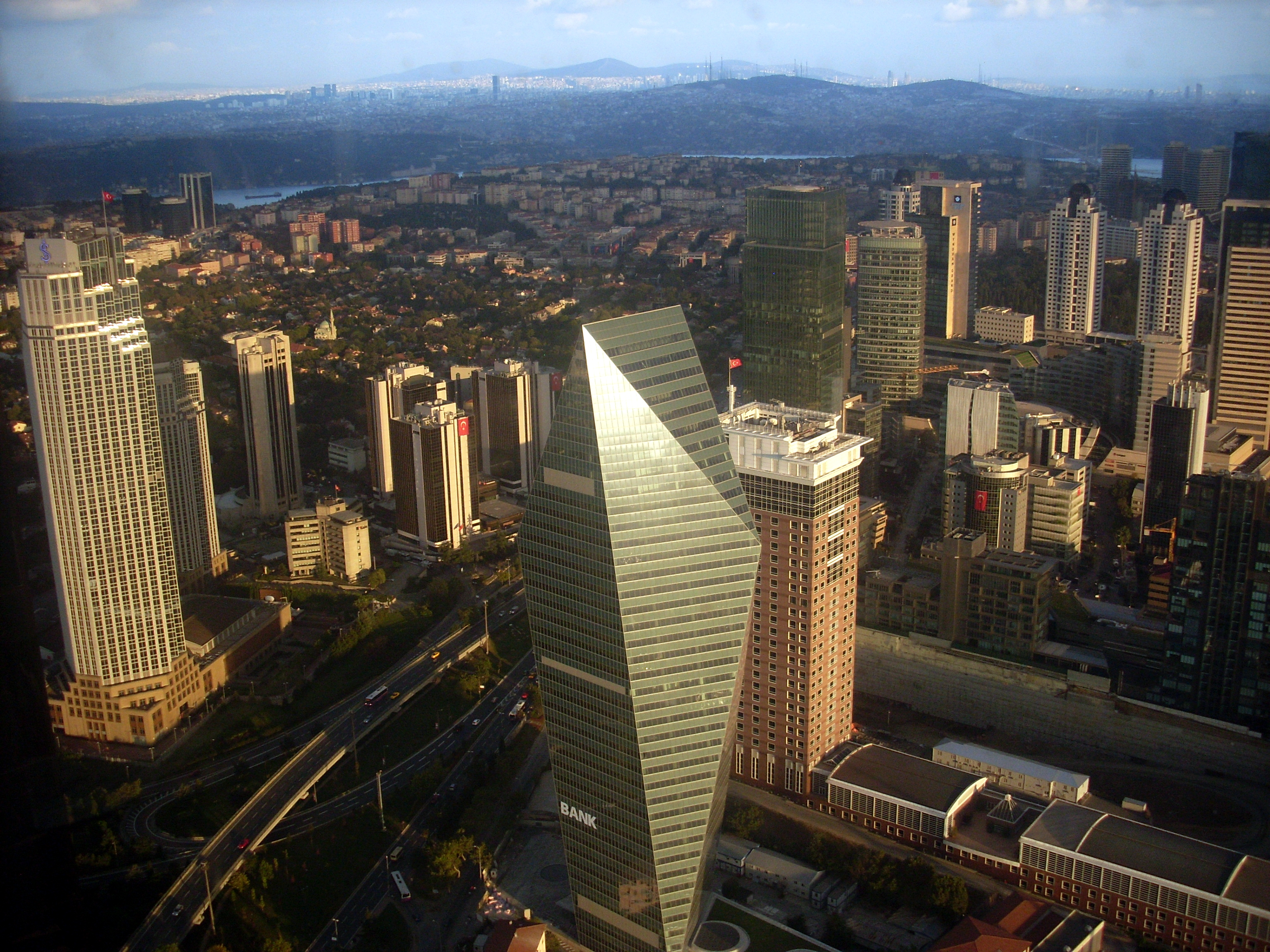
View of Levent and beyond from Istanbul Sapphire mall

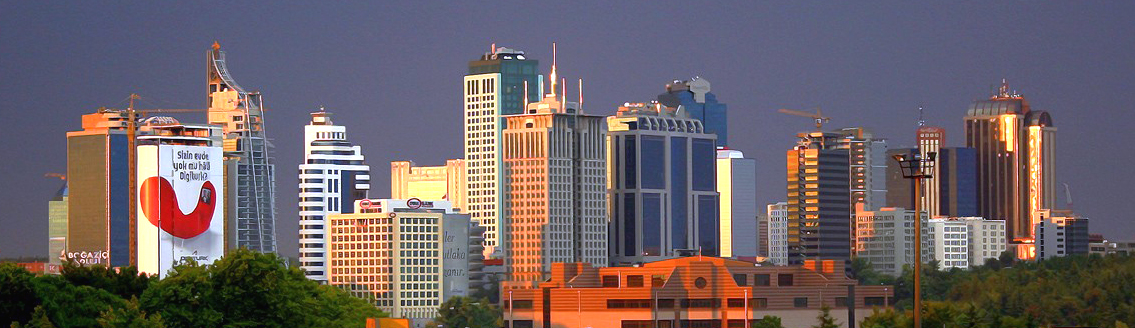
Maslak skyline (2007)

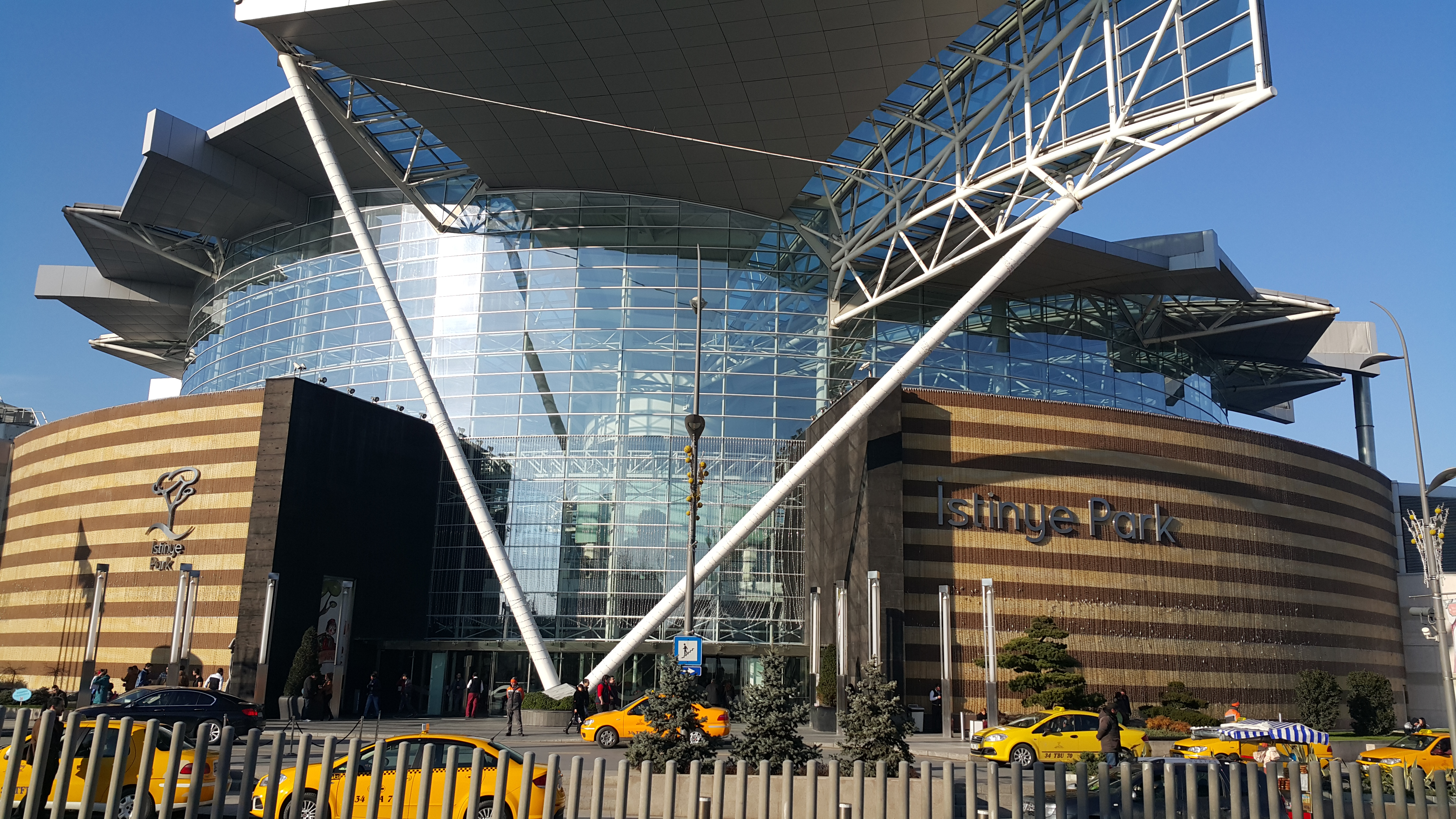
İstinye Park complex

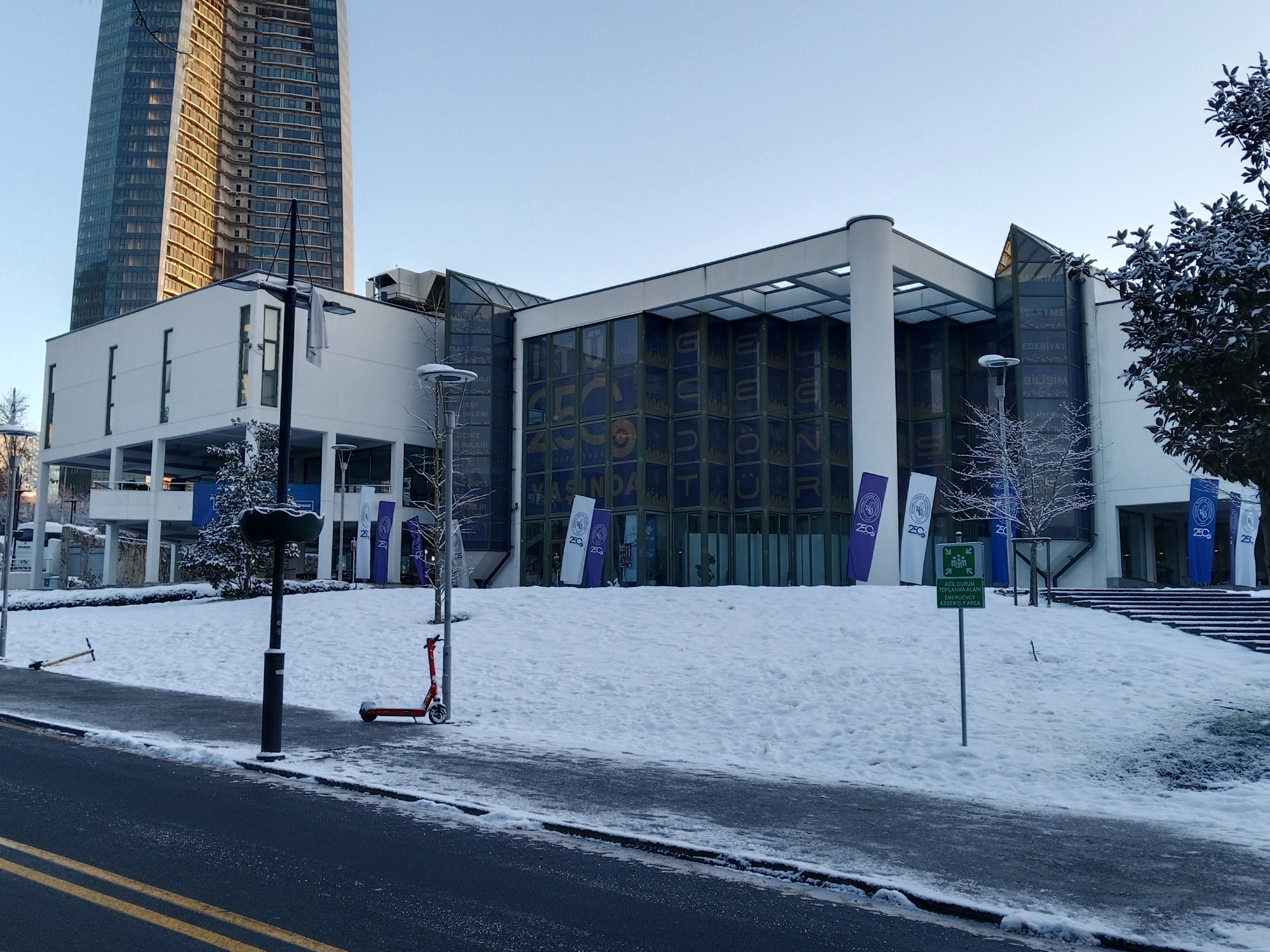
Süleyman Demirel Cultural Center at ITU

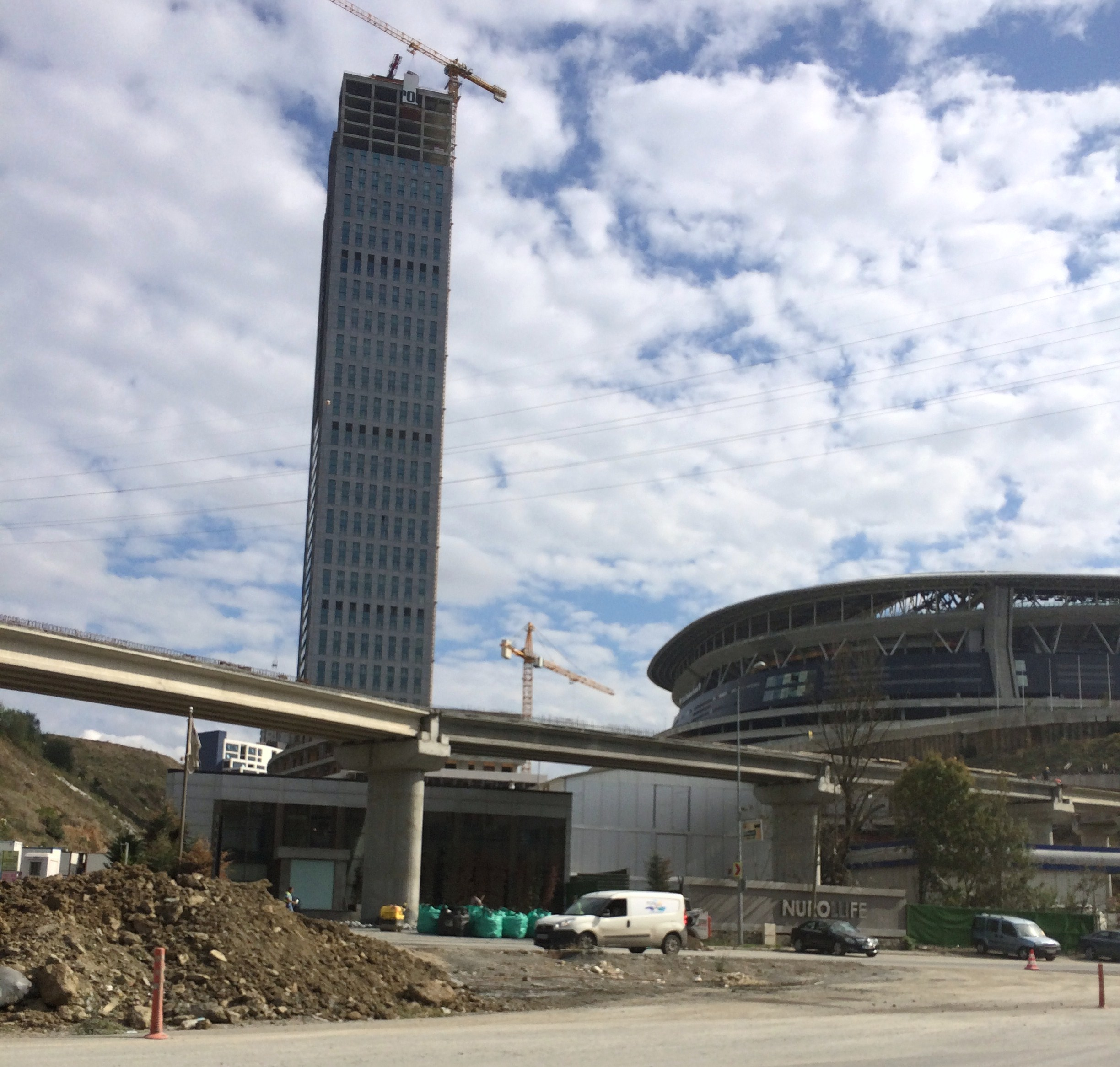
Vadistanbul construction (2016)
