= Etiler =

- Neighbourhood
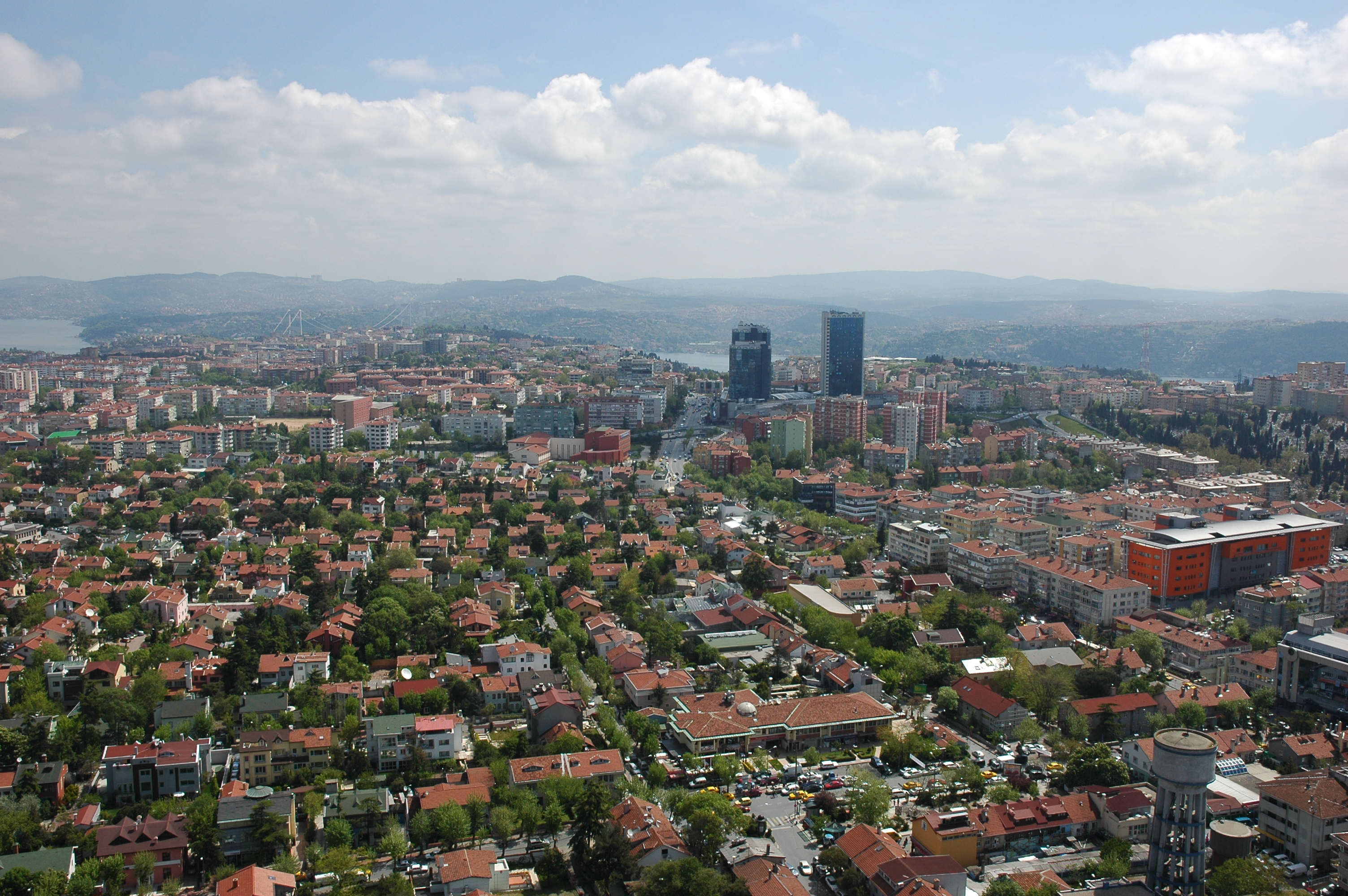
- Aerial view of Etiler

- Location within Turkey Location within Istanbul
- Coordinates: 41°4′36″N 29°1′41″E
- Country: Turkey
- Province: Istanbul
- District: Beşiktaş
- Population (2022): 11,258
- Time zone: UTC+3 (TRT)

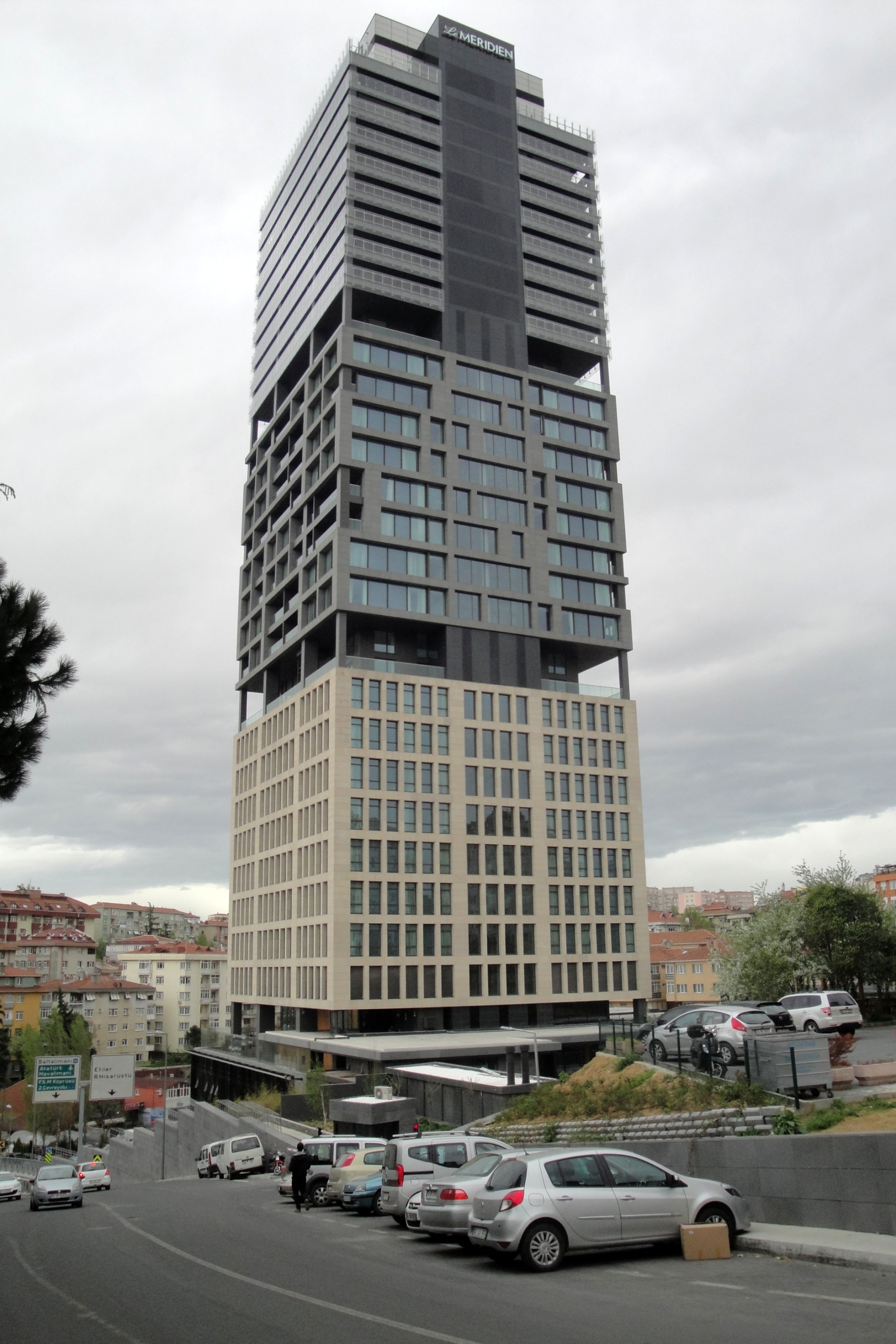
Le Méridien Istanbul Etiler Hotel

Etiler is a neighbourhood in the municipality and district of Beşiktaş, Istanbul Province, Turkey. Its population is 11,258 (2022). It is on the European side of Istanbul, close to the business quarters of Levent and Maslak.

Etiler is famous for its upmarket cafés, pubs, night clubs, restaurants, gyms, coiffeurs, fashion shops and shopping malls, such as Akmerkez. It is a favourite area among Istanbul's elite. The quarter also has many villas and private residences.

The name Etiler is an older name in Turkish for the Hittites, as it was fashionable in the early years of the Turkish Republic to claim ancient civilizations as Turkish and using them in the naming of new districts of Istanbul. A similar example is the neighbouring quarter of Akatlar, which means Akkads, another ancient civilization.

== Shopping ==
Akmerkez is one of the best known shopping malls in Istanbul. It has all the major fashion brands, cafes and restaurants. Mayadrom is a smaller, more boutique shopping centre. Nispetiye Street is considered as the core centre of Etiler, with cafes, restaurants and designer shops.

== Education ==
The Istanbul Japanese School is located in Etiler. Also, one of the campuses of the British International School Istanbul as well as a campus of Tarabya British Schools are located in Etiler.

Bogazici University, which is a public university with different faculties like education, engineering, and arts and sciences, is also located in Etiler. It is situated near the end of Nispetiye Street, and has a remarkable view of the Bosphorus, as well as the Anatolian side.

The middleschools, Hasan Ali Yücel Middleschool and the Cumhuriyet Middleschool are both located in the area as well.

== Transportation ==
The M6 metro line with 4 stops; Levent, Nispetiye, Etiler & Boğaziçi Üniversitesi connects Etiler to the rest of the Istanbul Metro.

There are buses from Kabatas, Taksim and Sisli to Etiler.
