= F4 (Istanbul funicular) =

Istanbul funicular line

Coordinates: 41.08325°N 29.05015°E

F4 Boğaziçi Ü./Hisarüstü–Aşiyan

Overview
- Status: Operating
- Owner: Istanbul Metropolitan Municipality
- Locale: Istanbul, Turkey
- Termini: Boğaziçi Üni. station, Beşiktaş (West); Aşiyan station, Beşiktaş (East)
- Stations: 2

Service
- Type: Funicular
- System: Istanbul Metro
- Route number: F4
- Operator(s): Metro Istanbul A.Ş.

History
- Opened: 28 October 2022

Technical
- Line length: 0.8 km (0.50 mi)
- Number of tracks: 1 (with a passing loop)
- Track gauge: 1,435 mm (4 ft 8 1/2 in) standard gauge

The F4, officially referred to as the F4 Boğaziçi Üni./Hisarüstü–Aşiyan funicular line (Turkish: F4 Boğaziçi Üni./Hisarüstü–Aşiyan füniküler hattı) is an 800 m (2,600 ft) long funicular railway in Beşiktaş, Istanbul. When opened on 28 October 2022, it became the fourth funicular line in Istanbul as well as the longest, surpassing the F3 line by 100 m (330 ft). The F4 line traverses a height difference of about 116.1 m (381 ft) and total travel time is estimated at 2 minutes and 30 seconds.

The line begins at Boğaziçi Üniversitesi station and heads east to Aşiyan along the Bosporus. It is connected to the M6 line at Boğaziçi Üniversitesi. The entrance to Boğaziçi Üniversitesi station is constructed next to the main entrance to Boğaziçi University.

== Line ==
No	Station	District	Transfer	Type	Notes
1	Rumeli Hisarüstü	Beşiktaş	(Boğaziçi Üniversitesi/Hisarüstü); İETT Bus: 43R, 59R, 59RS, 559C	Underground	Boğaziçi University
2	Aşiyan	Beşiktaş	(Aşiyan Ferry); İETT Bus: 22, 22RE, 25E, 40T, 42T	Underground	Aşiyan Cemetery
