= Etiler station =

Station of the Istanbul Metro

Etiler
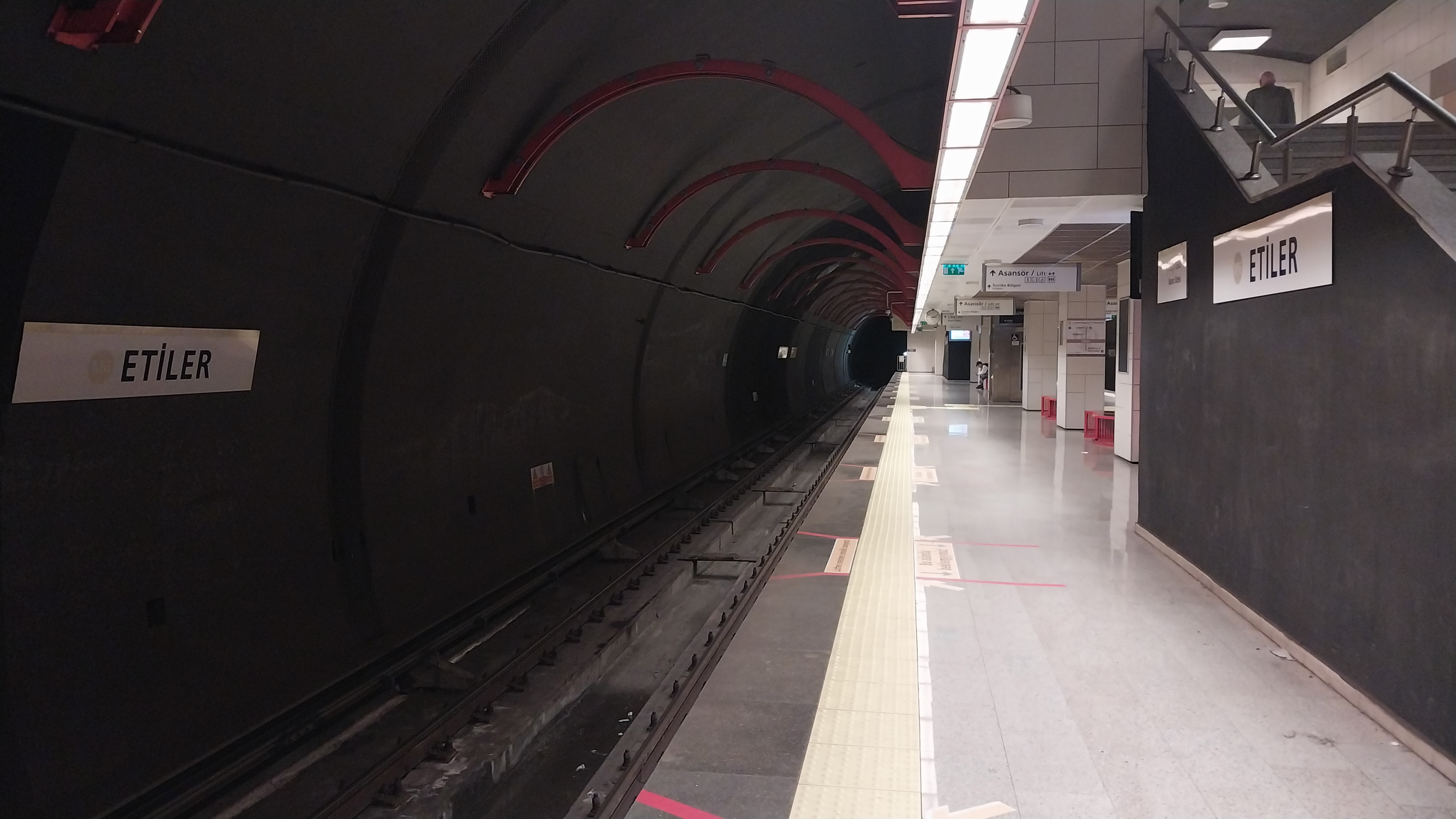

General information
- Location: Nispetiye Cd., Etiler Mah., 34337; Beşiktaş, Istanbul
- Coordinates: 41.0823°N 29.0375°E
- System: Istanbul Metro rapid transit station
- Owner: Istanbul Metropolitan Municipality
- Line: M6
- Platforms: 1 island platform
- Tracks: 2
- Connections: İETT Bus: 43R, 59K, 59R, 59RS, 59UÇ, 559C

Construction
- Structure type: Underground
- Accessible: Yes

History
- Opened: 19 April 2015
- Electrified: 750 V DC Third rail

Services
| Preceding station | Istanbul Metro | Following station |
|---|---|---|
| Nispetiye towards Levent | M6 Line | Boğaziçi Üniversitesi Terminus |
Location

Etiler is an underground station on the M6 line of the Istanbul Metro in Beşiktaş, Istanbul. It is located beneath Nispetiye Avenue in Etiler. The stations consists of an island platform serviced by two tracks.

The Etiler station was opened on 19 April 2015, along with the entire M6 line.

== Layout ==
| Westbound | ← toward Levent |
Island platform
| Eastbound | toward Boğaziçi Üniversitesi → |
