= Nispetiye station =

Station of the Istanbul Metro

Nispetiye
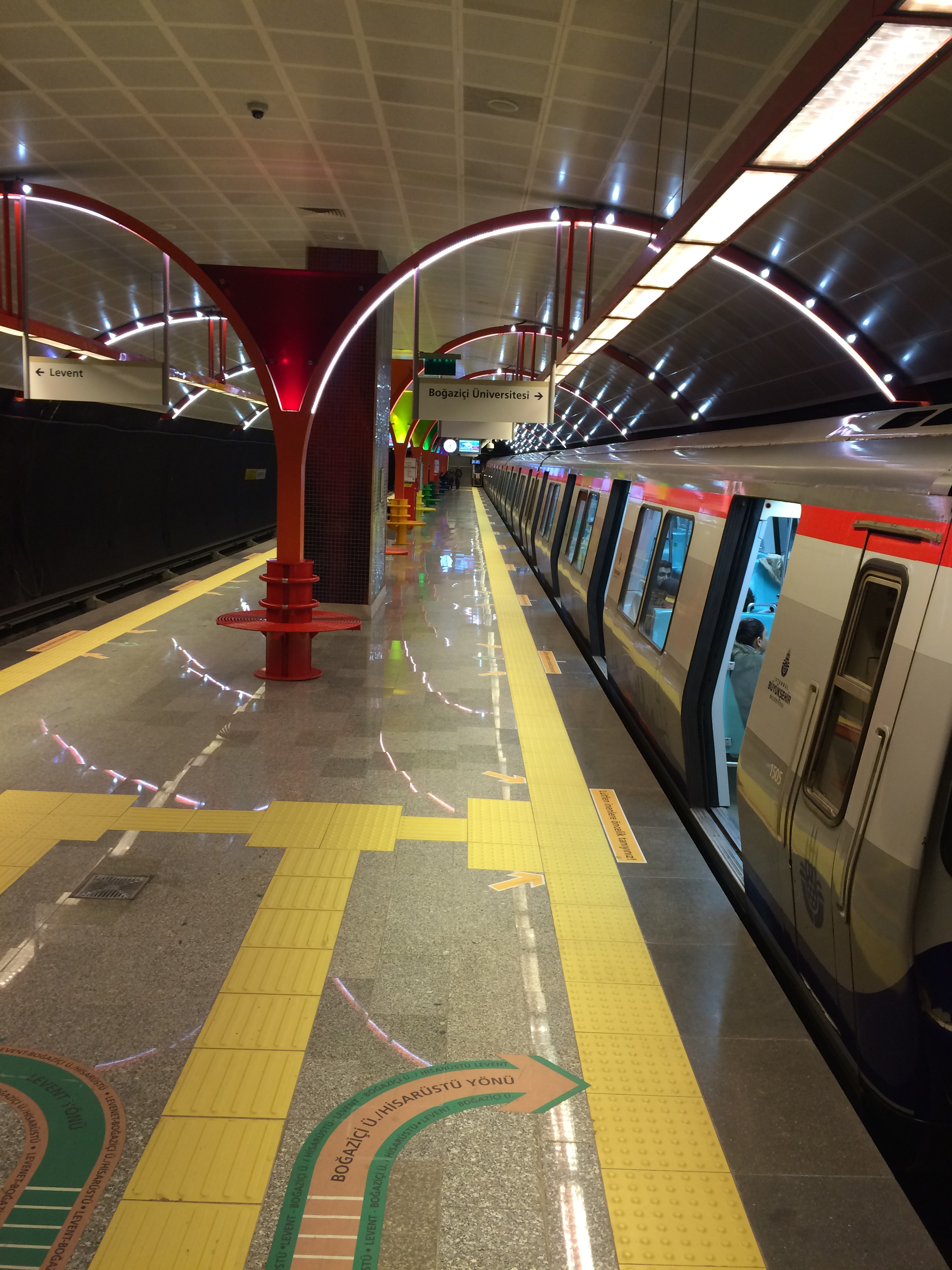
- Eastbound train at the station

General information
- Location: Nispetiye Cd., Etiler Mah., 34337; Beşiktaş, Istanbul
- Coordinates: 41.0773°N 29.0237°E
- System: Istanbul Metro rapid transit station
- Owner: Istanbul Metropolitan Municipality
- Line: M6
- Platforms: 1 island platform
- Tracks: 2
- Connections: İETT Bus: DT1, DT2 U1, U2; Istanbul Minibus: Zincirlikuyu-Poligon Mahallesi, Zincirlikuyu-Baltalimanı

Construction
- Structure type: Underground
- Accessible: Yes

History
- Opened: 19 April 2015
- Electrified: 750 V DC Third rail

Services
Preceding station	Istanbul Metro	Following station
Levent Terminus	M6 Line	Etiler towards Boğaziçi Üniversitesi
Location

Nispetiye is an underground station on the M6 line of the Istanbul Metro in Beşiktaş, Istanbul. It is located beneath Nispetiye Avenue, just east of Levent. The stations consists of an island platform serviced by two tracks.

Nispetiye station was opened on 19 April 2015, along with the entire M6 line.

== Layout ==
Westbound	← toward Levent
Island platform
Eastbound	toward Boğaziçi Üniversitesi →

== Nearby Points of Interest ==
- Akmerkez
