= M6 (Istanbul Metro) =

M6 Levent–Boğaziçi Üniversitesi/Hisarüstü
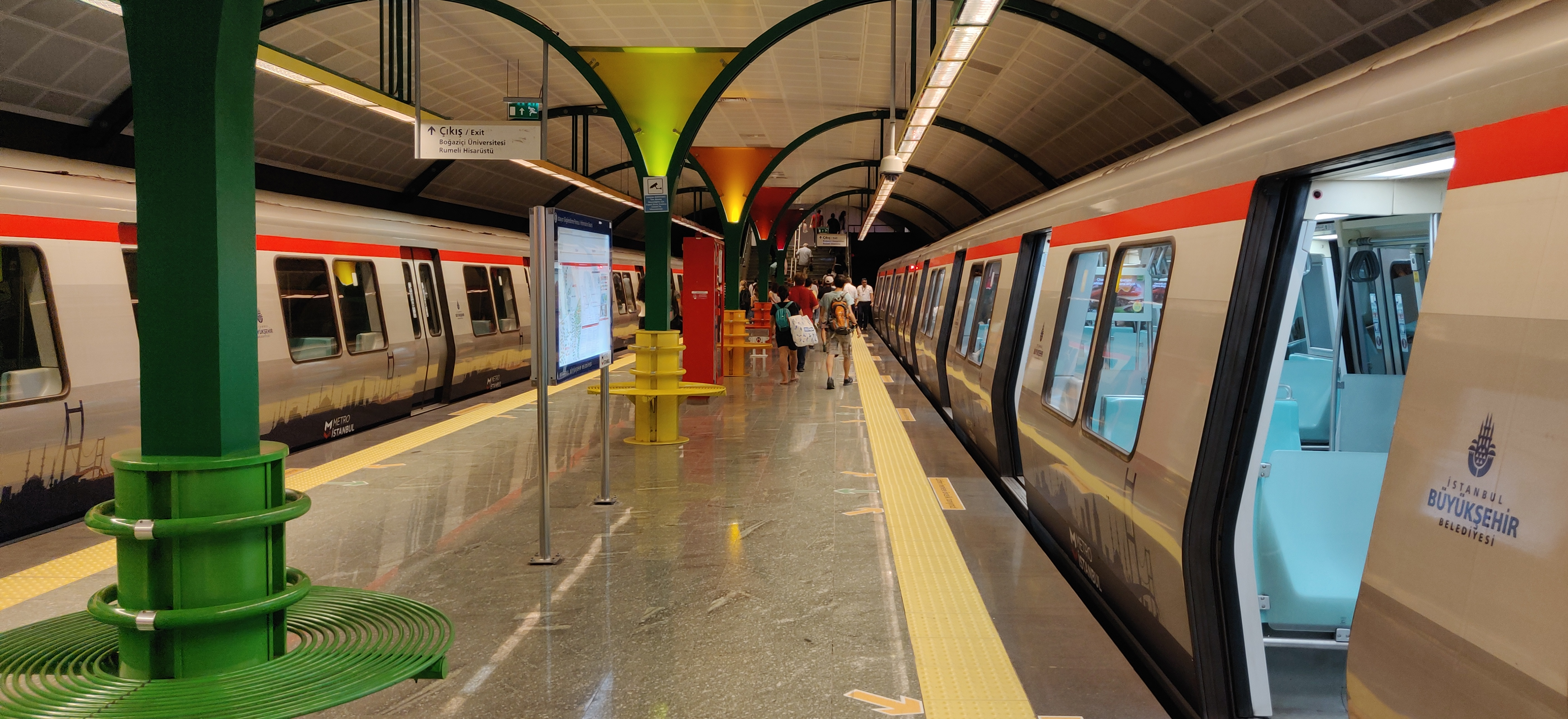

Overview
- Status: Operating
- Owner: Istanbul Metropolitan Municipality
- Locale: Istanbul, Turkey
- Termini: Levent station, Beşiktaş; Boğaziçi Üni. station, Beşiktaş
- Stations: 4
- Website: M6

Service
- Type: Rapid Transit
- System: Istanbul Metro
- Services: 1
- Route number: M6
- Operator: Metro Istanbul A.Ş.
- Depot: Seyrantepe
- Rolling stock: 12 Alstom; 4 carriages per trainset
- Daily ridership: 20,000

History
- Opened: 19 April 2015; 11 years ago

Technical
- Line length: 3.3 km (2.1 mi)
- Number of tracks: 2 (1 between stations)
- Track gauge: 1,435 mm (4 ft 8 1/2 in) standard gauge
- Electrification: 750 V DC Third rail
- Operating speed: 80 km/h (50 mph)

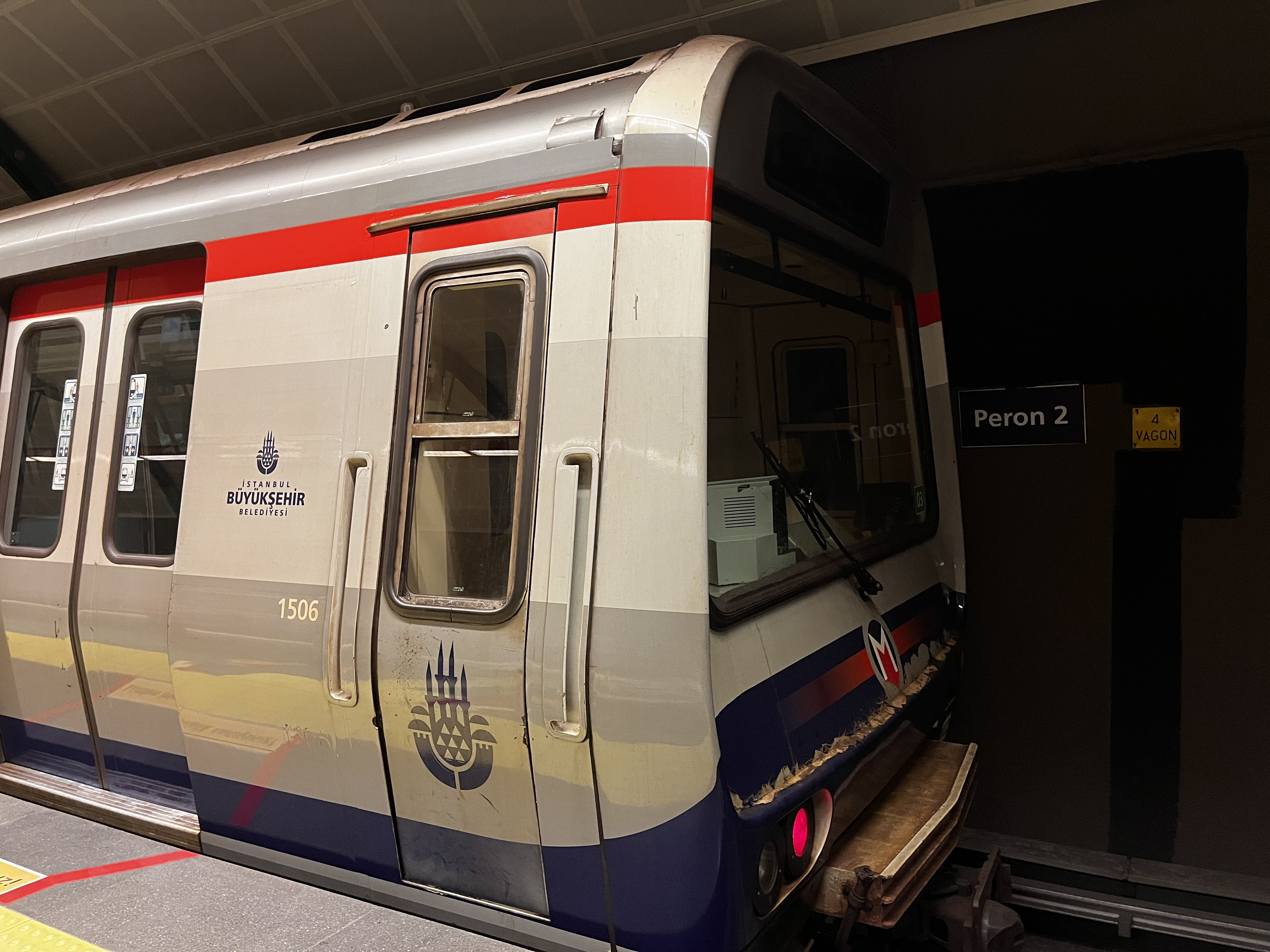
M6 Metro train at Boğaziçi University

Line M6, officially referred to as the M6 Levent – Boğaziçi Üniversitesi/Hisarüstü line, is a 3.3-kilometre (2.1 mi) light metro line of the Istanbul Metro. It is colored tan on the maps and route signs. The line opened for public service on 19 April 2015. Except for the very small Tünel, this line is the shortest of the Istanbul Metro system with only four stations.

== Overview ==
The project was a cooperation between Istanbul Metropolitan Municipality and the Ministry of Transport, Maritime and Communication. The metro tunnel is a single tube, which is constructed 25 metres (82 ft) underground by New Austrian Tunnelling method (NATM). The 3.3-kilometre-long (2.1 mi) line with four stations connects to the M2 Yenikapı - Hacıosman metro line at Levent station. In terms of passenger capacity, 8,100 passengers per hour per direction can be transported, which makes this a light metro line rather than a fully rapid transit line. M6 operates two 4-car trains (which can be increased to three trains), running with a top speed of 80 km/h (50 mph) speed with at least 5–minute headways during peak hours. The travel time between the termini stations is 6–7 minutes.

It was initially planned to go into public service on 29 October 2014, on the Republic Day, but the metro line ultimately opened on 19 April 2015.

Connection to the F4 funicular line is available from the Boğaziçi University station to reach Aşiyan on the shore of the Bosphorus.

== Stations ==
The M6 has a total of four stations, the least on any metro line in the city. The only connection to another metro line is at Levent, where connection to the M2 is available.

M6 route diagram

M6 Levent-Boğaziçi Üniversitesi
| Station | District | Opened | Connections |
|---|---|---|---|
| Levent | Beşiktaş | 19 April 2015 | Istanbul Metro: İETT Bus: 25G, 27E, 27SE, 27T, 29, 29A, 29C, 29D, 29E, 29İ, 29P, 29Ş, 36L, 40B, 41AT, 41E, 42, 42M, 42Z, 49Z, 50Z, 62, 62G, 63, 64Ç, 65G, 121A, 121B, 121BS, 122B, 122C, 122D, 122Y, 522B, 522ST, 622 |
| Nispetiye | Beşiktaş | 19 April 2015 | İETT Bus: DT1, DT2 U1, U2 |
| Etiler | Beşiktaş | 19 April 2015 | İETT Bus: 43R, 59K, 59R, 59RS, 59UÇ, 559U |
| Boğaziçi Üniversitesi | Beşiktaş | 19 April 2015 | İETT Bus: 43R, 59R, 59RS, 559C; Istanbul Funicular: |

== Rolling stock ==
The line often uses two Alstom trains which are also used on M2, but sometimes one of the trains used is a Hyundai Rotem, again also used on M2.

== See also ==
- Public transport in Istanbul
- Istanbul Metro
- Istanbul modern tramways
- Istanbul nostalgic tramways
