= Kanyon Shopping Mall =

Shopping mall in Istanbul, Turkey

Coordinates: 41°04′42″N 29°00′40″E

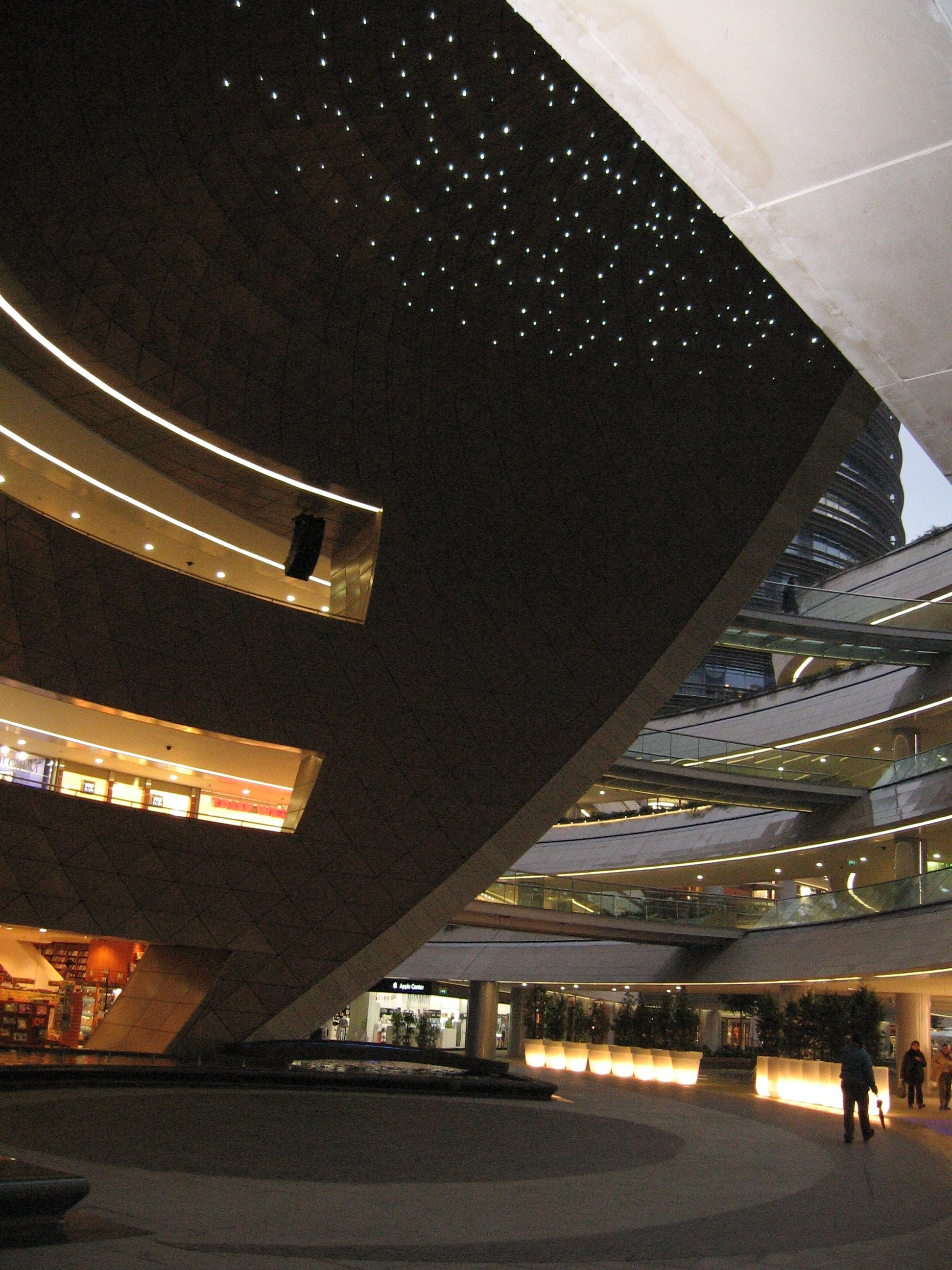
Kanyon Mall located in the Levent business district of Istanbul

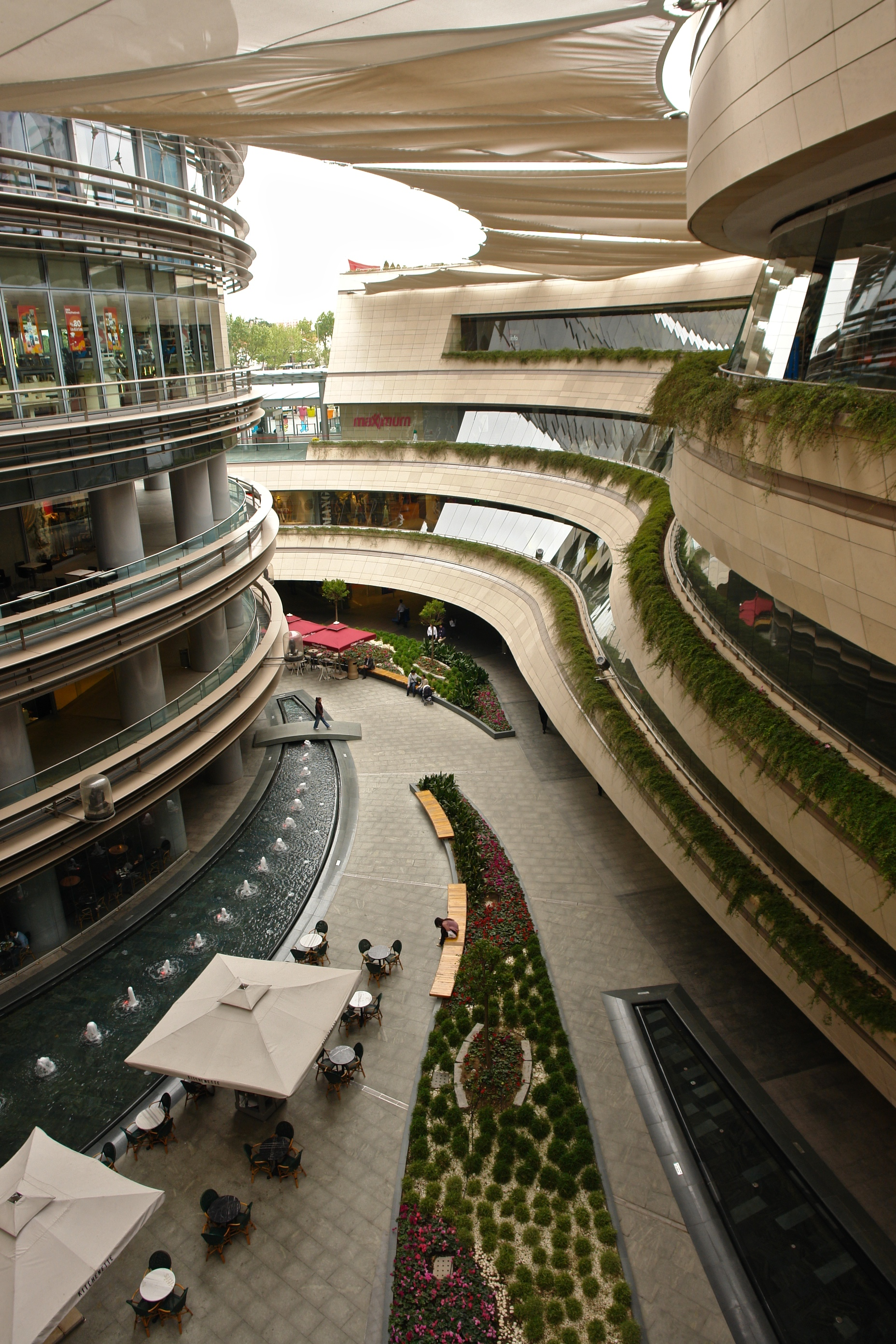
Another view of the canyon effect

Kanyon (meaning Canyon in Turkish) is a multi-purpose complex located on the Büyükdere Avenue in the Levent business district of Istanbul, Turkey. Opened on 6 June 2006, it unites a 160-store shopping mall (covering an area of 37,500 m^{2}), a 30-floor office tower (26 floors of which rise above street level) and a 22-floor residential block with 179 residential apartments into a complex undulating around a dramatic architectural "canyon". The total construction area of the project is 250,000 m^{2}, with 30,000 m^{2} of rentable office area, 37,500 m^{2} of rentable retail area, 180 residential flats, 160 stores, 9 theater halls with a capacity of 1,600 spectators, and a parking facility for 2,300 vehicles. Each floor of the office tower has a total usable office space of 1,167 m^{2}. The complex rises on an area of 29,427 m^{2}.

== Development ==
Kanyon is a joint venture of the Eczacıbaşı Group and İŞGYO of Turkey. It was designed by The Jerde Partnership of Los Angeles, USA, who collaborated with Tabanlıoğlu Architects of Istanbul, Turkey, for developing the project. The Istanbul office of Ove Arup & Partners undertook the engineering and consultancy works, while Tepe Construction of Istanbul, Turkey, was the main construction company. IMS Engineering of Istanbul, Turkey, was responsible for the project management.

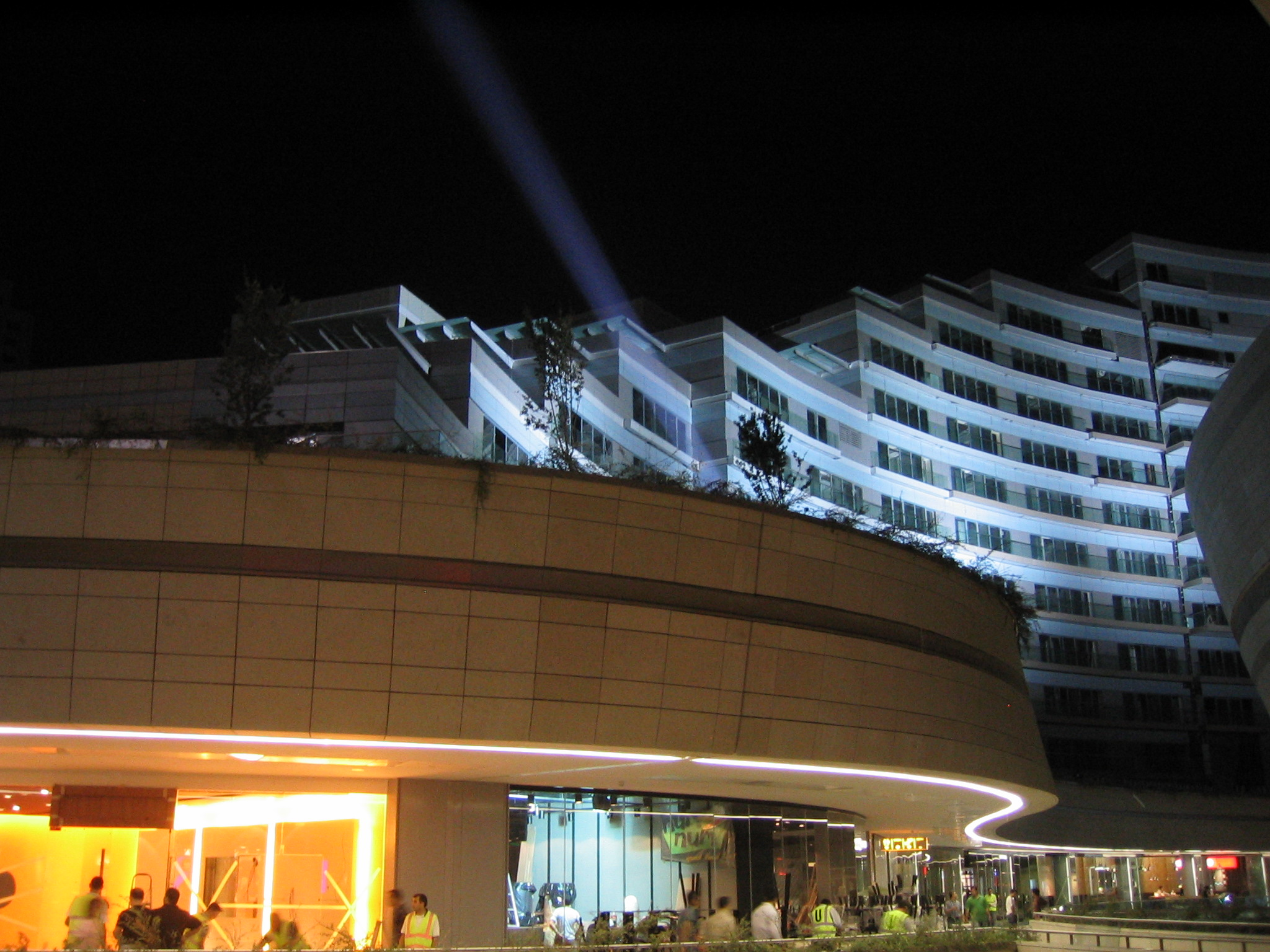
The mall's entrance

A view of the canyon

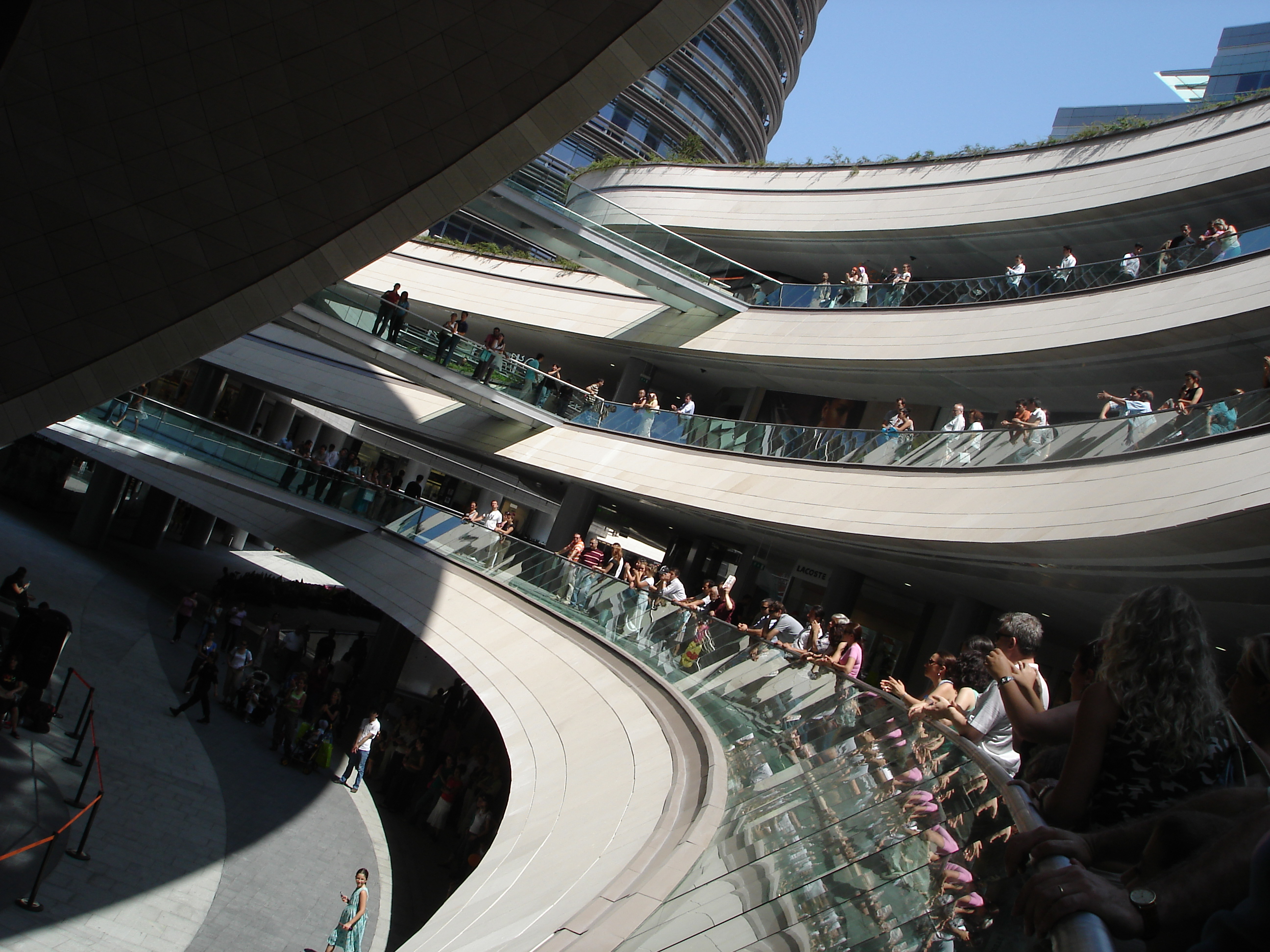
The winding retail levels

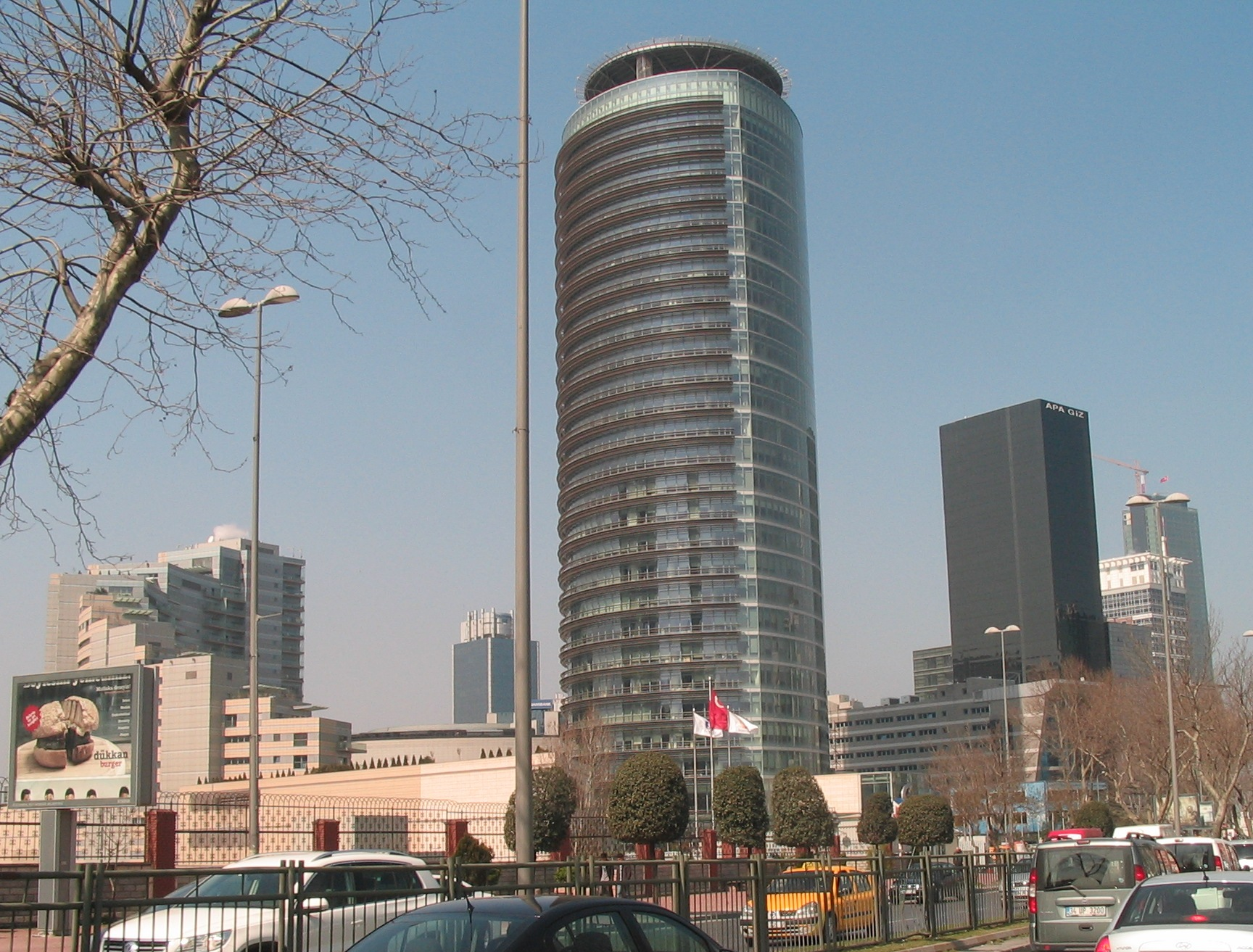
Kanyon Office Tower

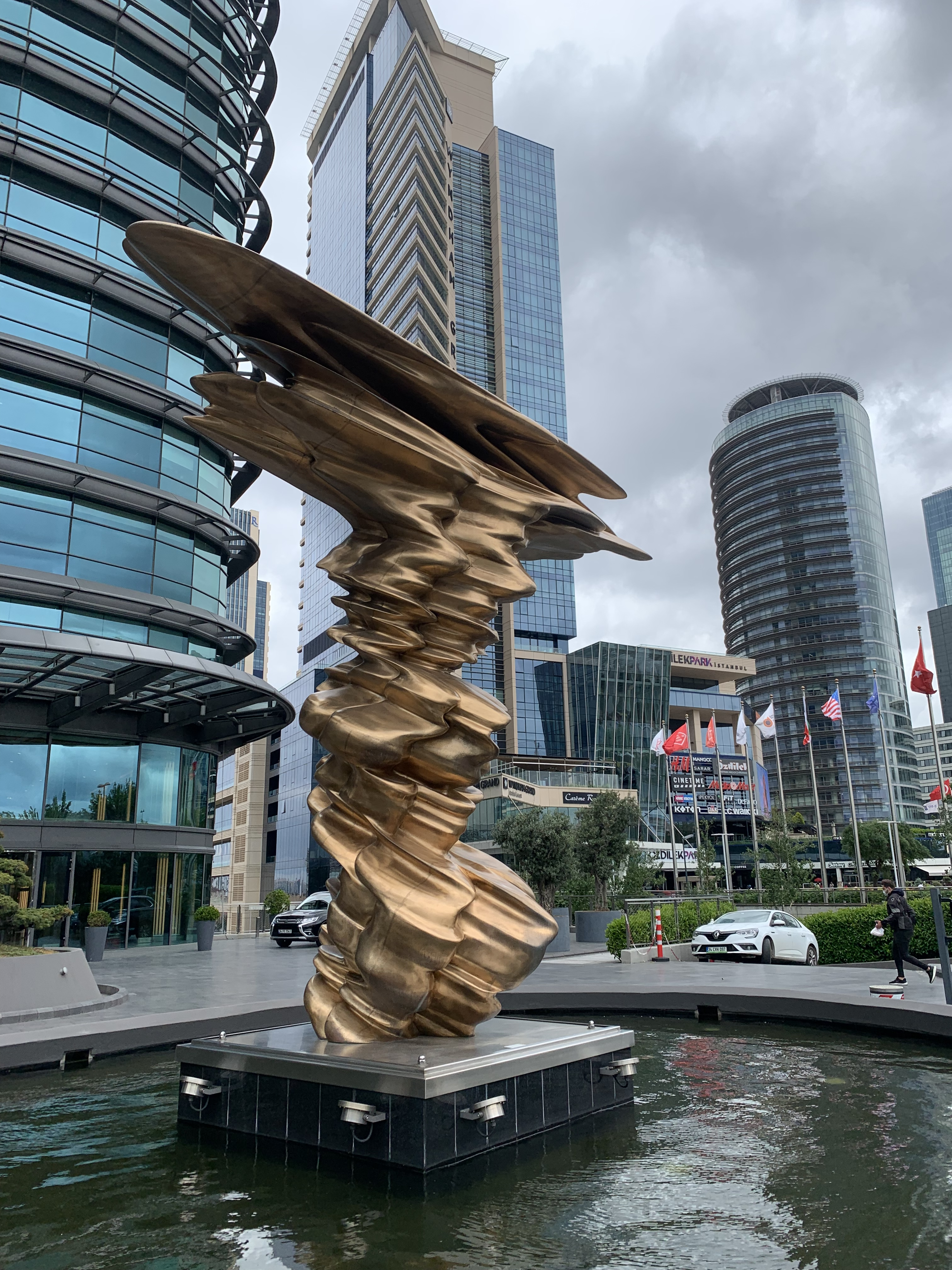
Kanyon Office Tower (at right, in the background)

== Awards ==
Kanyon won the 2006 Cityscape Architectural Review Award in the "Commercial Built" category, during a ceremony which was held in Dubai, United Arab Emirates, on 4 December 2006.

== See also ==
- List of shopping malls in Istanbul
- Akmerkez
