= Levent station =

Station of the Istanbul Metro

Levent (M2) Levent (M6)
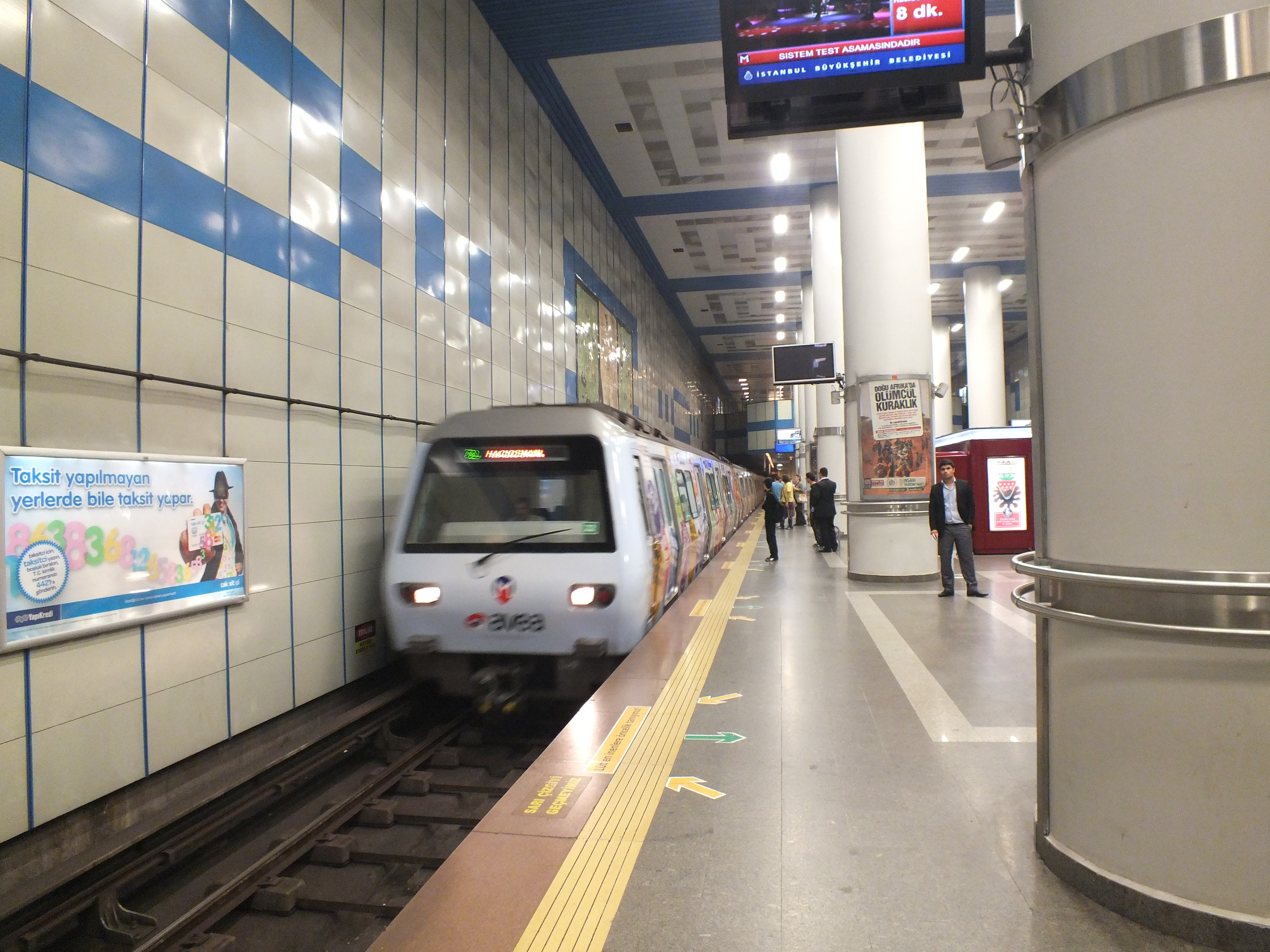

General information
- Coordinates: 41.077663°N 29.013128°E
- System: Istanbul Metro rapid transit complex
- Owner: Istanbul Metro
- Lines: M2; M6
- Platforms: 1 island platform (M2); 1 island platform (M6)
- Tracks: 2 (M2); 2 (M6)
- Connections: İETT Bus: 25G, 25T, 27E, 27M, 27SE, 27T, 29, 29A, 29C, 29D, 29P, 29İ, 29Ş, 36G, 36L, 36Z, 40B, 41AT, 41E, 41M, 41S, 42M, 42Z, 50Z, 62, 62G, 63, 64Ç, 65G, 121A, 121B, 121BS, 122B, 122C, 122D, 122M, 122Y, 522B, 522ST, SG-2; Istanbul Minibus: Beşiktaş-Sarıyer, Beşiktaş-Tarabya, Zincirlikuyu-Ayazağa, Zincirlikuyu-Bahçeköy, Zincirlikuyu-Pınar Mahallesi, Zincirlikuyu-Vadistanbul

Construction
- Structure type: Underground
- Accessible: Yes

History
- Opened: 16 September 2000 (M2); 19 April 2015 (M6)
- Electrified: 750 V DC Third rail (M2, M6)

Services
Preceding station	Istanbul Metro	Following station
Gayrettepe towards Yenikapı	M2 Line	4. Levent; towards Hacıosman
Terminus	M6 Line	Nispetiye towards Boğaziçi Üniversitesi
Location

Levent is an underground station on the M2 line of the Istanbul Metro. It is located under Büyükdere Avenue in Levent, the main financial district of Istanbul. Opened on 16 September 2000, Levent is one of the M2 line's six original stations. The station offers connections to İETT city bus service along Büyükdere Avenue, one of the busiest urban roadways in Turkey. Many important financial centers are in the immediate vicinity of the station such as the İşbank Tower 1, Yapı Kredi Headquarters and the Kanyon Shopping Mall which has an underground connection to the station.

Levent is also the western terminus of the M6 line. The M6 line runs east from Levent to Boğaziçi Üniversitesi, and opened on 19 April 2015.

It is in both Beşiktaş and Şişli.

== Layout ==
=== M2 platform ===
Southbound	← toward Yenikapı
Island platform
Northbound	toward Hacıosman →

=== M6 platform ===
Eastbound	toward Boğaziçi Üniversitesi →
Island platform
Eastbound	toward Boğaziçi Üniversitesi →

== Gallery ==
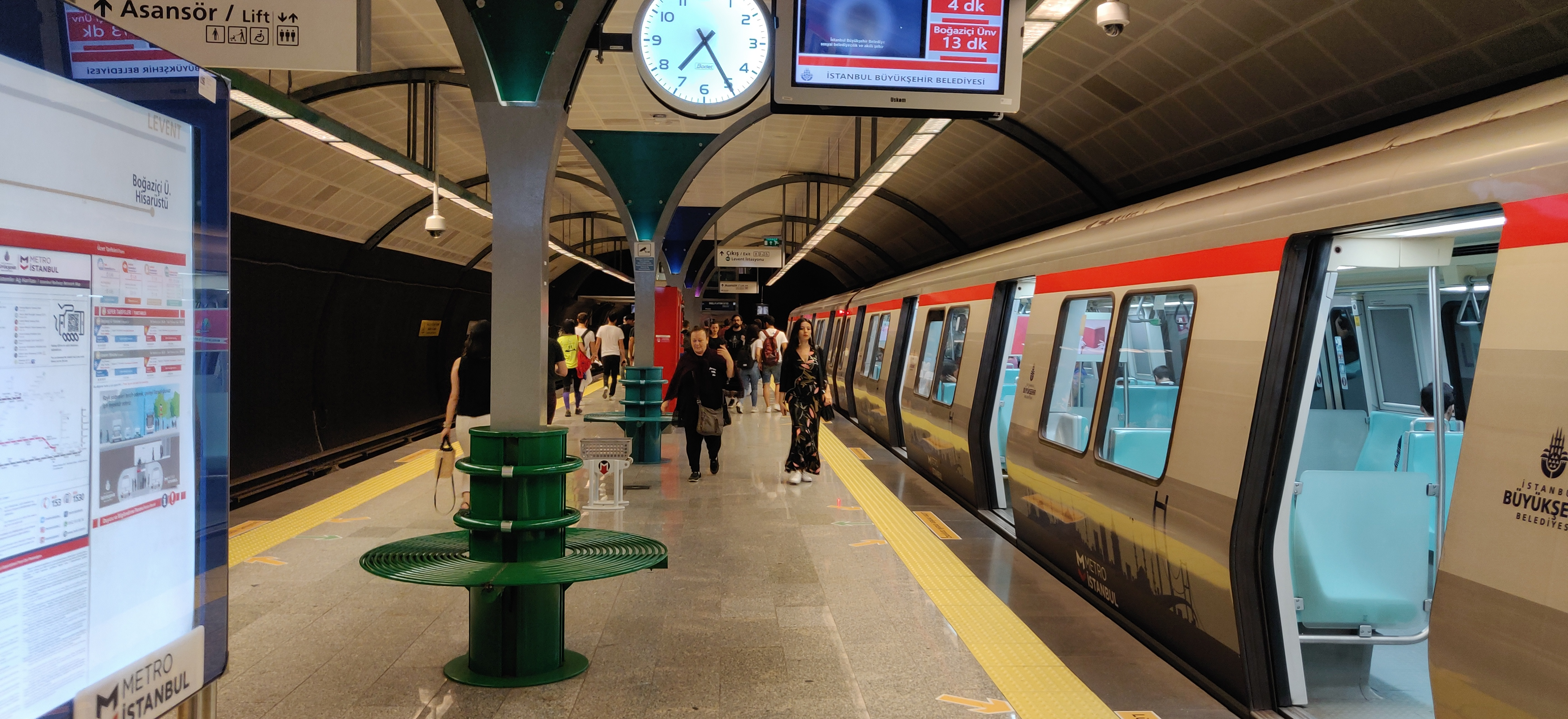
The M6 platform

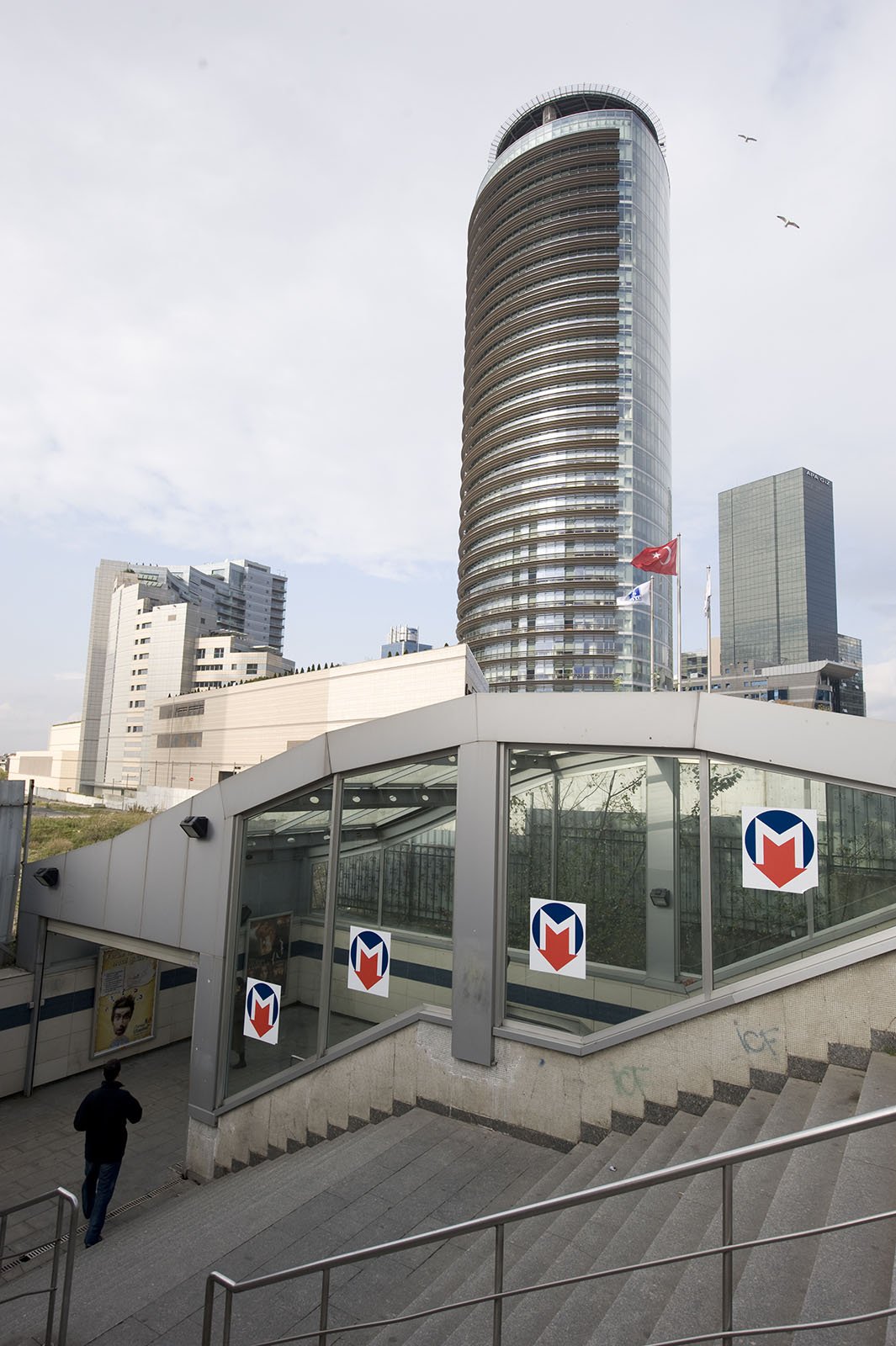
Levent Station and high-rises

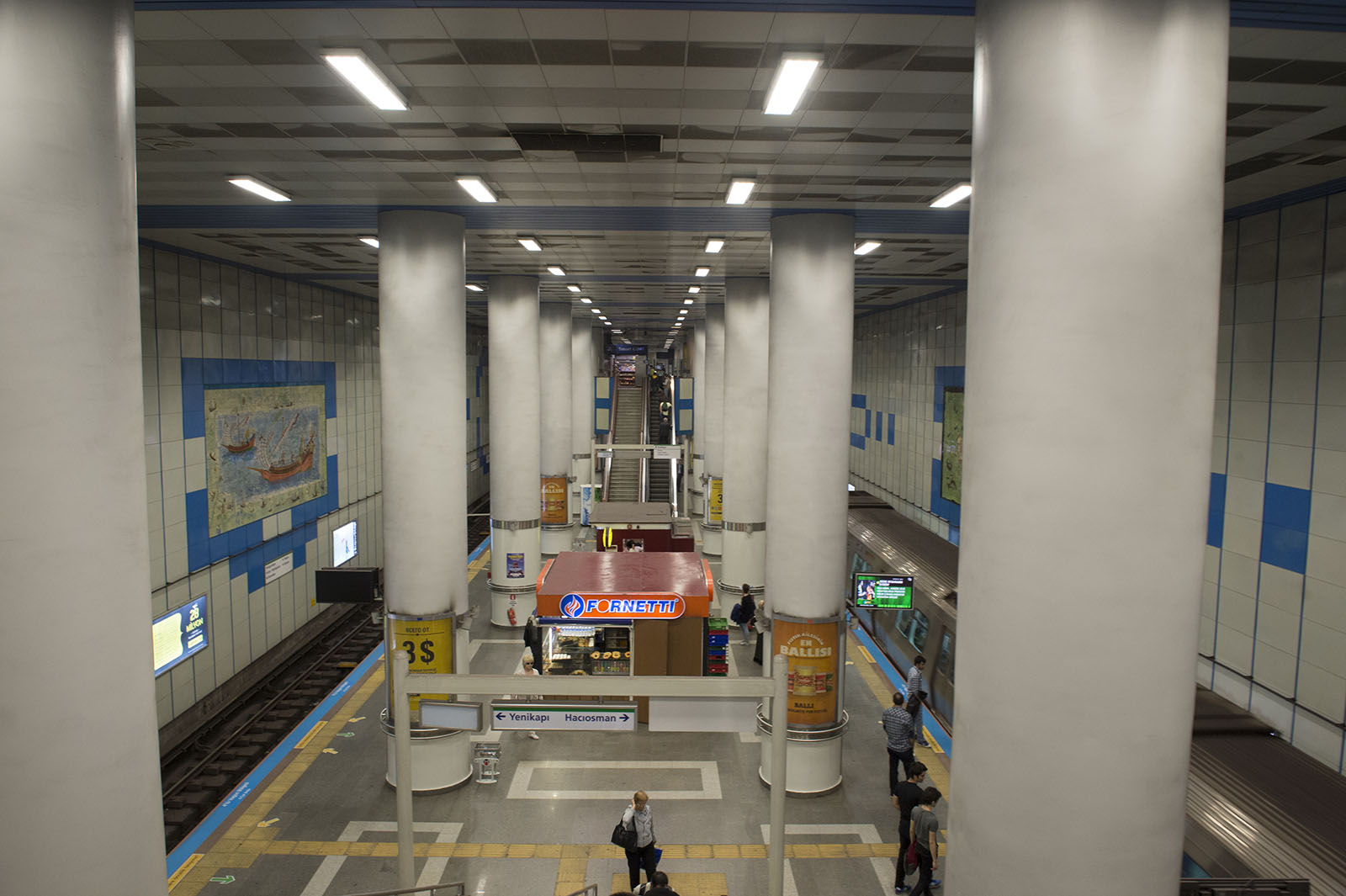
Levent Station

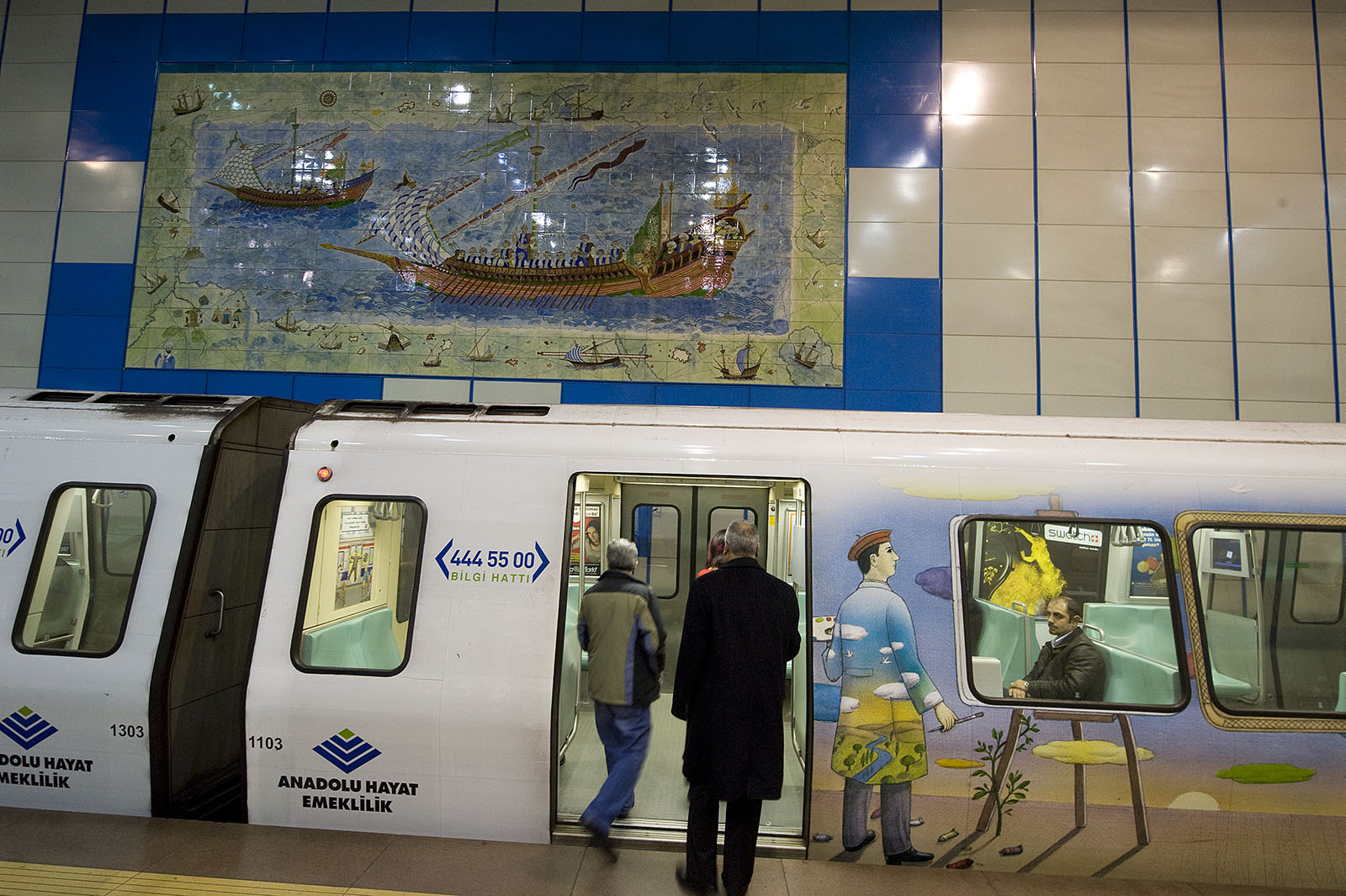
Levent Station with painted carriage

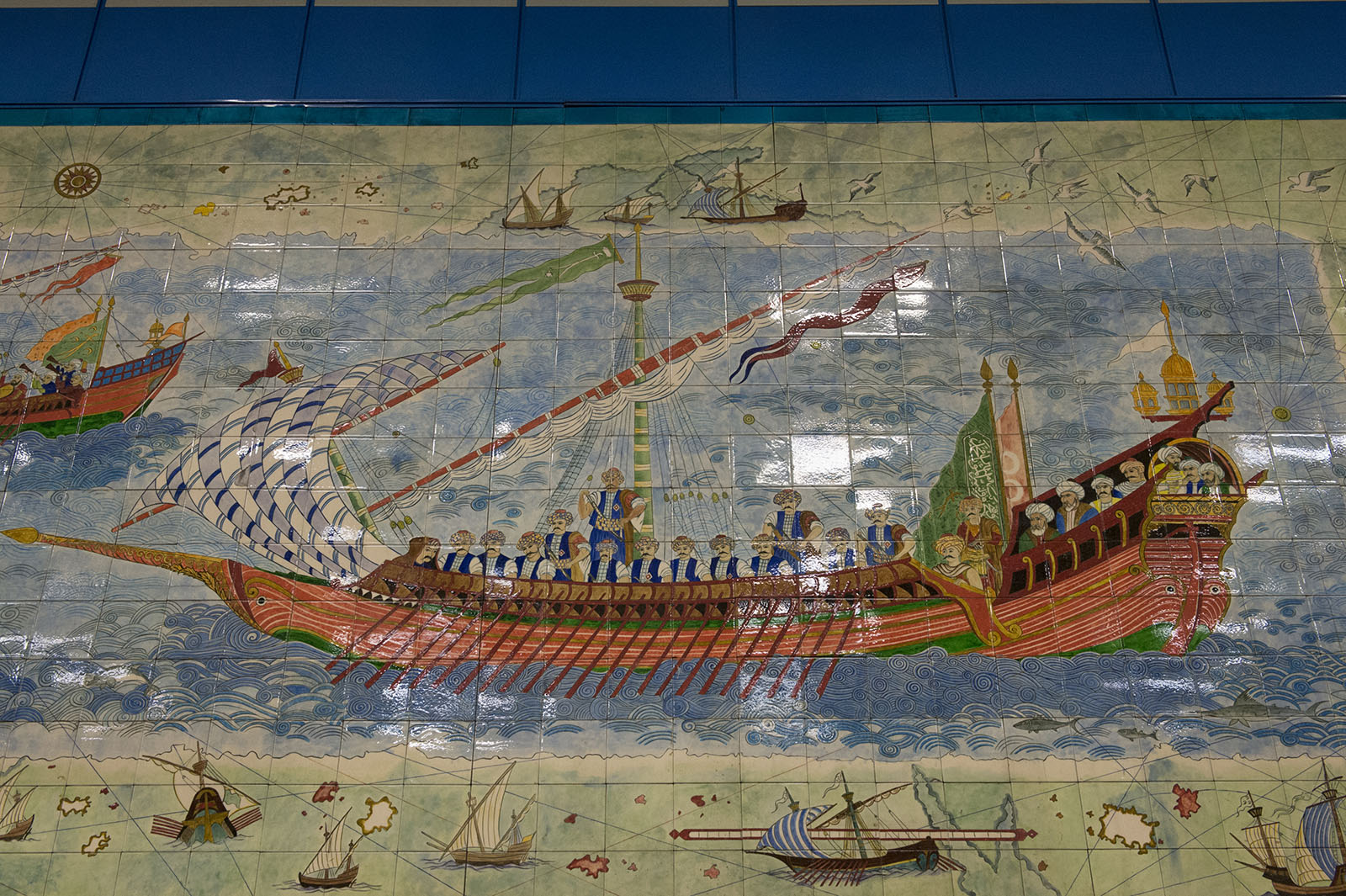
Levent Station Tile panel of galley
