= Akmerkez =

Coordinates: 41°04′37″N 29°01′37″E

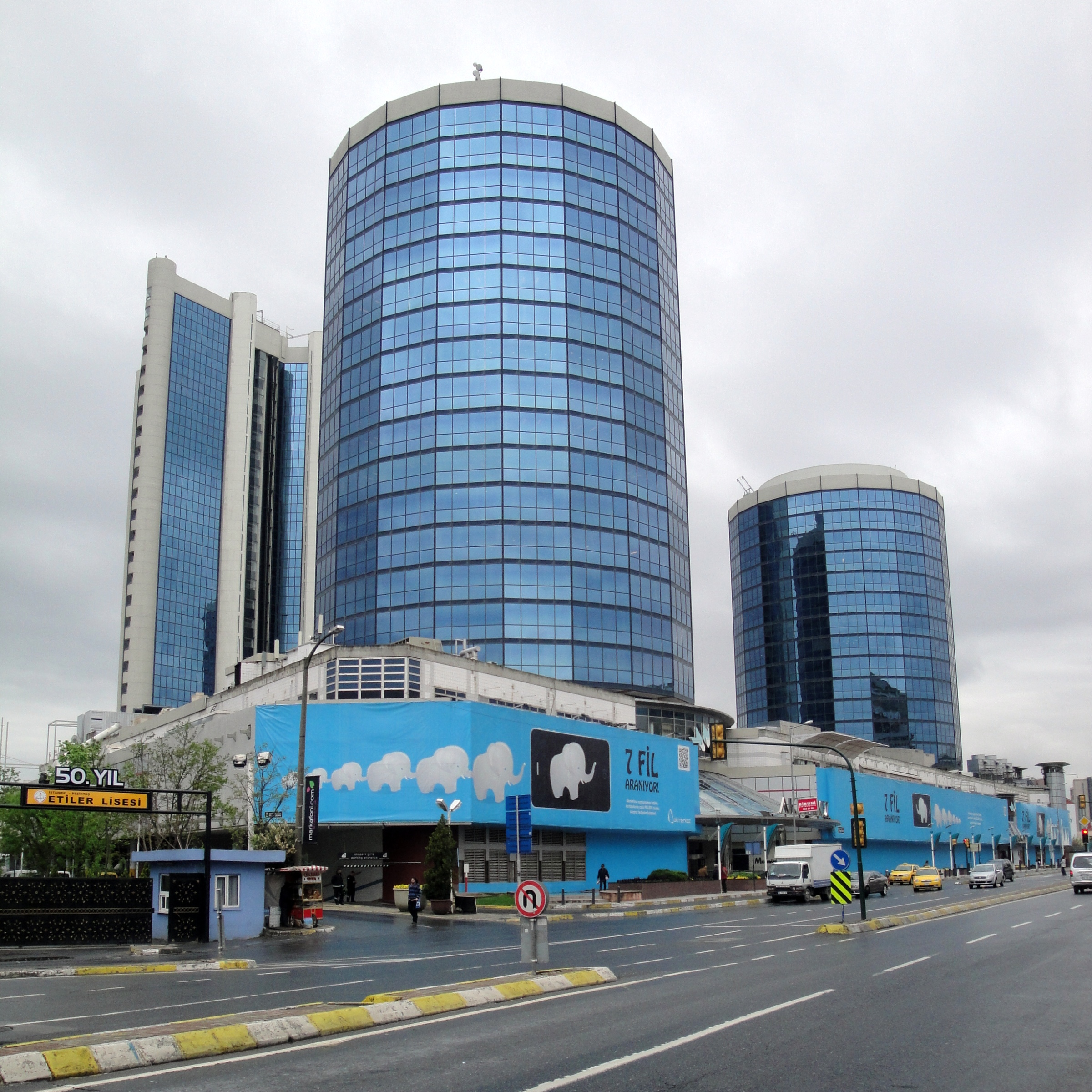
- Location: Etiler, Istanbul, Turkey
- Opened: December 18, 1993; 32 years ago
- Developer: Akkök-Tekfen-İstikbal
- Num. of stores: 246
- Floor area: 180,000 m^{2} (1,900,000 sq ft) (total enclosed area)
- Website: www.akmerkez.com.tr

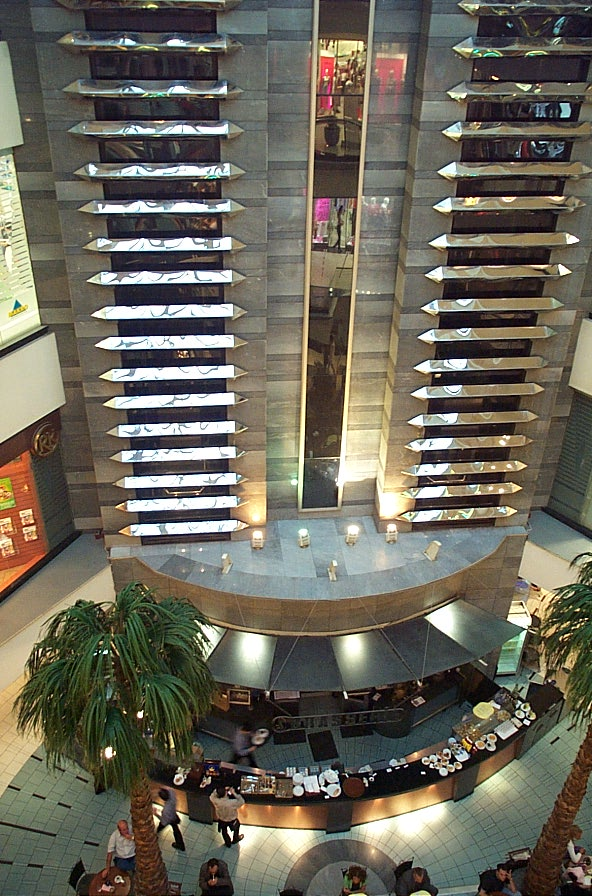
Interior view

Akmerkez is a shopping mall located in the Etiler quarter of Beşiktaş district in Istanbul, Turkey. As the country's third shopping mall following Galleria Ataköy and Capitol, it was opened by a joint venture of the Akkök, Tekfen and İstikbal companies on December 18, 1993.

The Akmerkez complex covers an area of 180,000 m^{2} (44 acres) and consists of a four-story shopping area, with two towers offering a total of 31 stories of office space, 14 and 17 in two towers, and a third tower with 24 stories of residential areas. The shopping area, offering visitors 246 stores, is spread over a triangular area connected to the surrounding main roads through 3 atria. The total rentable store area is 35,000 m^{2} (380,000 sq ft). There are 41 escalators, 2 panoramic elevators and 30 elevators. The cleaning, security and general maintenance is provided by a workforce of 250 people.

In 2005, the shopping mall was converted into a real estate investment company, and 49% of the stakes were offered to the public. The Dutch real estate investment company Corio owns 46.9% of the public shares.

Akmerkez is visited by nearly 36,000–38,000 visitors on weekdays and 50,000 over the weekends. The number of visitors reached around 1.5 million per month, or 14 million a year. It is reported that the average visiting time is with three and half hours over the world average.

The shopping mall started to host art exhibitions and events with works of significant artists in 2002.

== Renovation ==
In 2008, a renovation project for the shopping mall was announced. Between 2013 and 2014, it underwent a complete renovation, which cost more than € 20 million.
