= Boğaziçi Üniversitesi station =

Station of the Istanbul Metro

Boğaziçi Üniversitesi (M6) Boğaziçi Üniversitesi (F4)
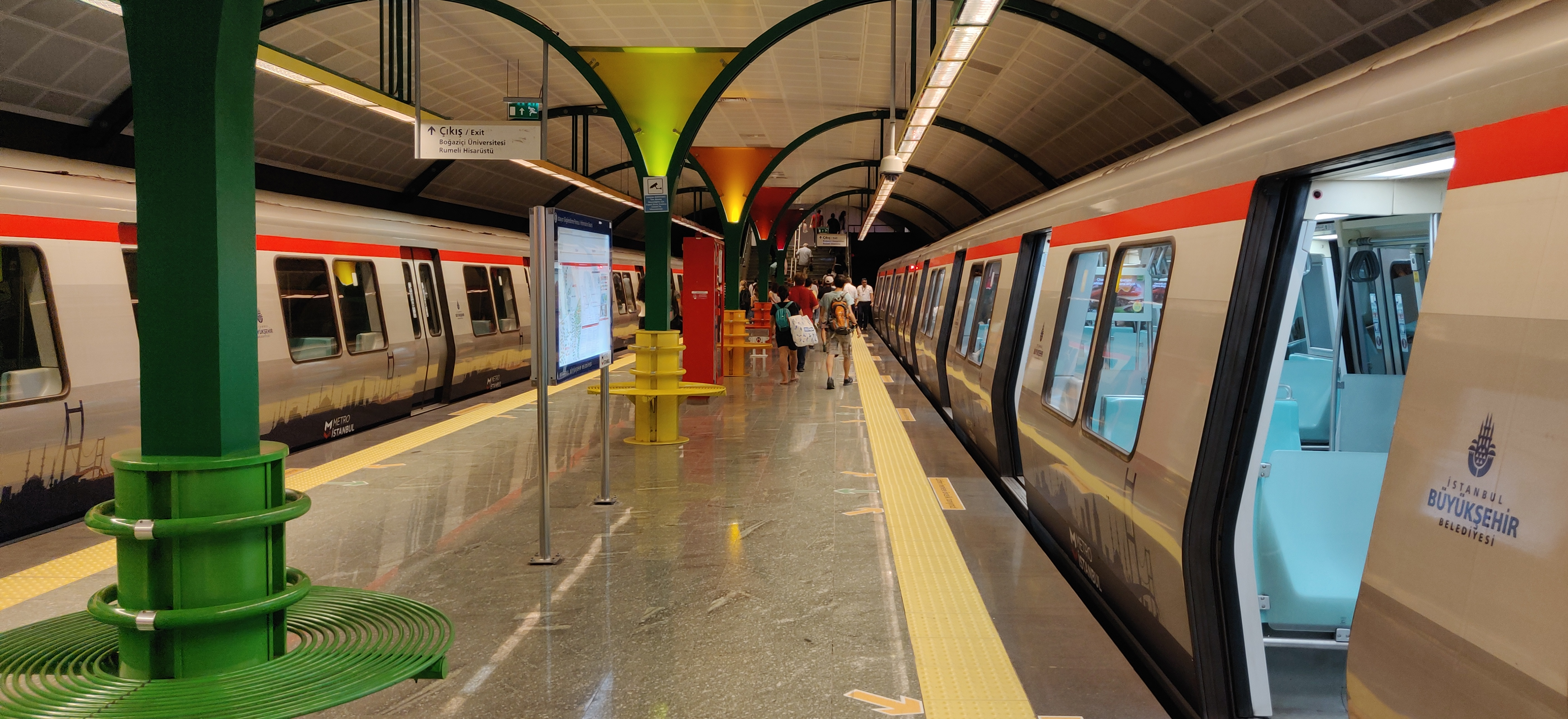
- A Levent-bound train (right) waits to depart the station.

General information
- Coordinates: 41.085061°N 29.045534°E
- Owner: Istanbul Metro
- Lines: M6; F4
- Platforms: 1 island platform
- Tracks: 2 (M6); 1 (F4)
- Connections: İETT Bus: 43R, 59R, 59RS, 559C

Construction
- Structure type: Underground
- Accessible: Yes

History
- Opened: 19 April 2015 (M6); 28 October 2022 (F4)
- Electrified: 750 V DC Third rail

Services
Preceding station	Istanbul Metro	Following station
Etiler towards Levent	M6 Line	Terminus
Terminus	F4	Aşiyan Terminus
Location

Boğaziçi Üniversitesi, also named Rumeli Hisarüstü, is an underground rapid transit station on the M6 line of the Istanbul Metro. It is located in northeast Beşiktaş under Hisar Üstü Nispetiye Avenue. The station is named after the Boğaziçi University which is located right next to it.

Connection to the F4 funicular line is available to go to Aşiyan on the Bosphorus.

== Layout ==
=== M6 Platform ===
Westbound	← toward Levent
Island platform
Westbound	← toward Levent

=== F4 Platform ===
Side platform, doors will open on both sides
Eastbound	→ toward Aşiyan →
Side platform, doors will open on both sides
