= Sanayi Mahallesi station =

Station of the Istanbul Metro

Sanayi Mahallesi
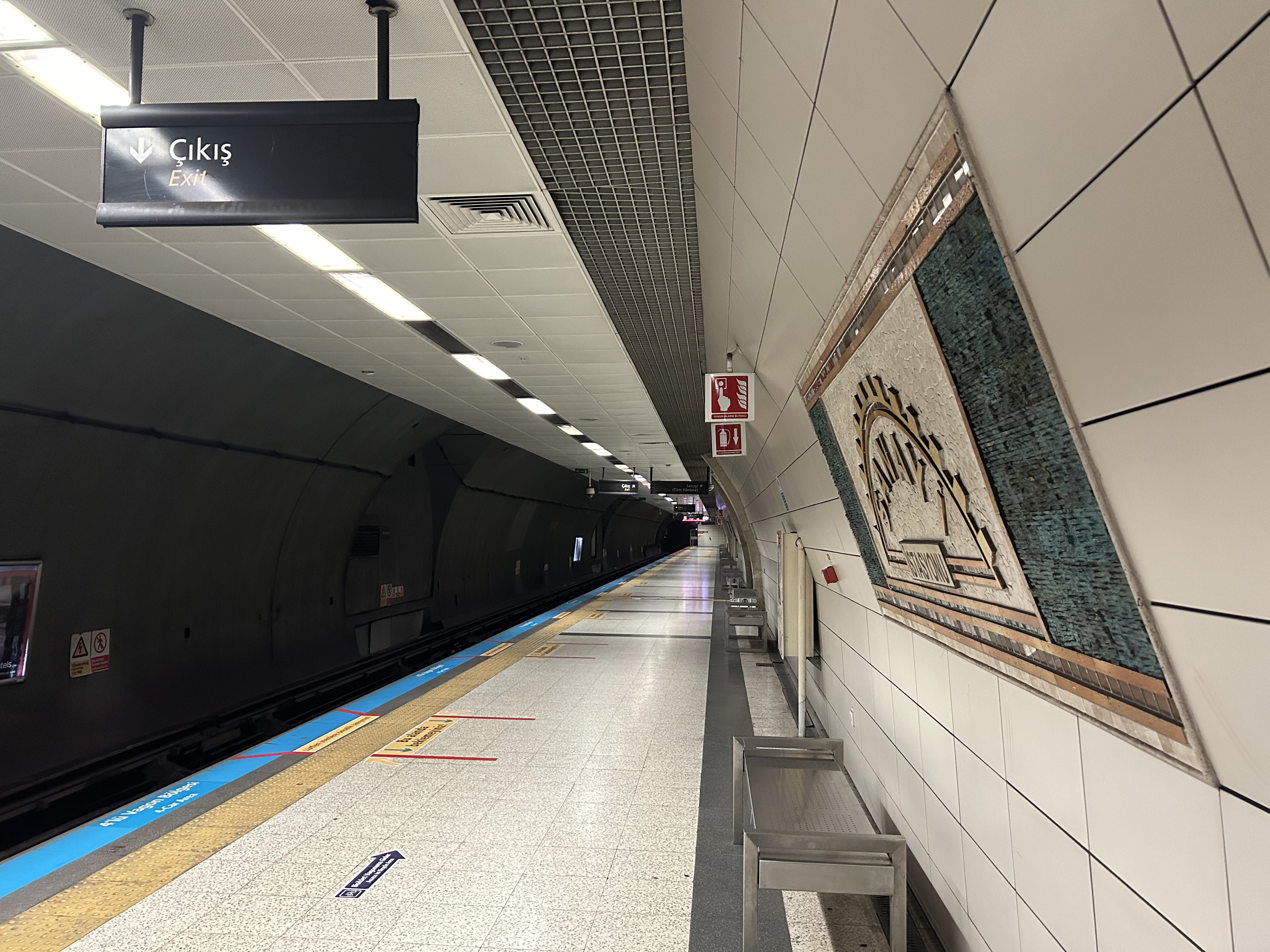
- Sanayi underground station platform

General information
- Coordinates: 41.093487°N 29.004770°E
- Owner: Istanbul Metro
- Line: M2
- Platforms: 2 island platforms
- Tracks: 3
- Connections: İETT Bus: 27E, 27SE, 27T, 29A, 29B, 29C, 29D, 29E, 29GM, 29P, 29Ş, 36G, 36L, 39Z, 40B, 41, 41AT, 41E, 41SM, 41ST, 42, 42M, 42Z, 48L, 50F, 50Z, 59RK, 59RS, 65A, 500L, 500T; Istanbul Minibus: Beşiktaş-Sarıyer, Beşiktaş-Tarabya, Zincirlikuyu-Ayazağa, Zincirlikuyu-Bahçeköy, Zincirlikuyu-Pınar Mahallesi, Zincirlikuyu-Vadistanbul, 4. Levent-Darüşşafaka, Baltalimanı-Reşitpaşa-4. Levent

Construction
- Structure type: Underground
- Accessible: Yes

History
- Opened: 31 January 2009
- Electrified: 750V DC Third rail

Services
Preceding station	Istanbul Metro	Following station
4. Levent; towards Yenikapı	M2 Line	İ.T.Ü.–Ayazağa towards Hacıosman
Seyrantepe Terminus	M2 Line	Terminus
Location

Sanayi Mahallesi is an underground rapid transit station on the M2 line of the Istanbul Metro. It is located under Büyükdere Avenue between Levent and Maslak, Istanbul's two main financial districts. The station was opened on 31 January 2009 as part of the northern extension to Atatürk Oto Sanayi and has two island platforms serviced by three tracks. Sanayi is one of five stations of the Istanbul Metro to have this layout along with Otogar, Yenikapı, Bostancı and Olimpiyat. The M2 shuttle service to Seyrantepe originates and terminates at Sanayi station on its own track.

== Layout ==
Southbound	← toward Yenikapı
Island platform, doors will open on the left, right
Northbound	toward Hacıosman →
Island platform, doors will open on the left, right
Shuttle	toward Seyrantepe →
