= Abdulhakim Sanjak Mosque =

Mosque in Istanbul Technical University

Coordinates: 41.1063°N 29.0306°E

- Abdülhakim Sancak Camii
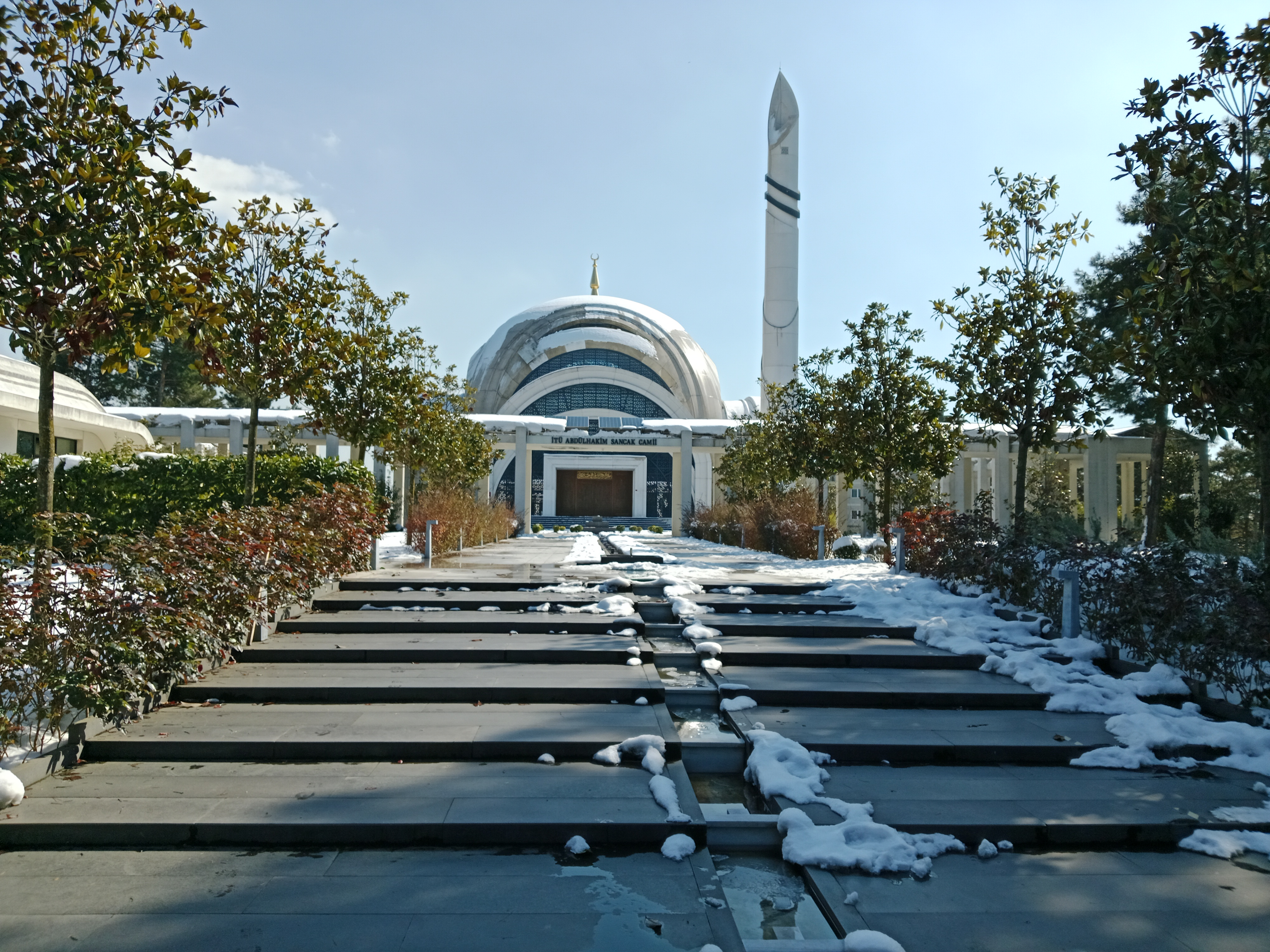

Religion
- Status: Active

Location
- Location: Istanbul Technical University, Maslak
- Municipality: Istanbul
- Country: Turkey
- Interactive map of Abdulhakim Sanjak Mosque

Architecture
- Type: Mosque
- Style: Modern
- Funded by: Sancak Vakfı
- Established: September 7, 2019

Specifications
- Interior area: 1200 m^{2}
- Dome: 1
- Dome height (outer): 21 m
- Dome dia. (outer): 26 m
- Minaret: 1
- Minaret height: 39 m
- Materials: Mostly concrete, wood and marble

Abdulhakim Sanjak Mosque (Turkish: Abdülhakim Sancak Camii), or ITU Mosque is a mosque located in Istanbul Technical University. It was established in September 7, 2019, on a total area of 11,500 square meters. For use of the mosque, it is required to be an ITU student, academician or personal. The minaret of the mosque was made in the shape of a pencil, emphasizing being a part of a university.

== Architectural structure ==
The mosque is generally built in a modern and unusual architectural style. The exterior features predominantly white marble and glass. The staircases are made of black marble or wood. Alternatively to staircases, it includes ramps.

It is a total of 3 floors. The middle floor, which is also the entrance floor, can be accessed from the main entrance and two different doors. The lower floor is partially underground, and can be accessed from two doors and the indoor stairs on the middle floor. The top floor is not as large as the other floors. It is generally used by women. The lower floor has a yellow carpet, and the middle floor has a blue one. The only chandelier in the mosque is on the middle floor.

The mosque is built on an area of 11,500 square meters. The worship area of the mosque is located on a 1,200 square meter area. While it has a capacity of approximately 2,500 people, this capacity can be increased to 5,000 with its courtyard.

The ground of its courtyard is totally covered with white marble. There is an ornamental pool in the middle of the courtyard. The solar panels around the courtyard are used to meet the energy needs of the mosque. Also, there is a parking lot near the courtyard. There is also a washroom just outside the courtyard.

The mosque has only one minaret which is similar to a pencil. The purpose of that is to emphasize that it is a part of a university. The height of the minaret is equal to 39 meters.

== Gallery ==
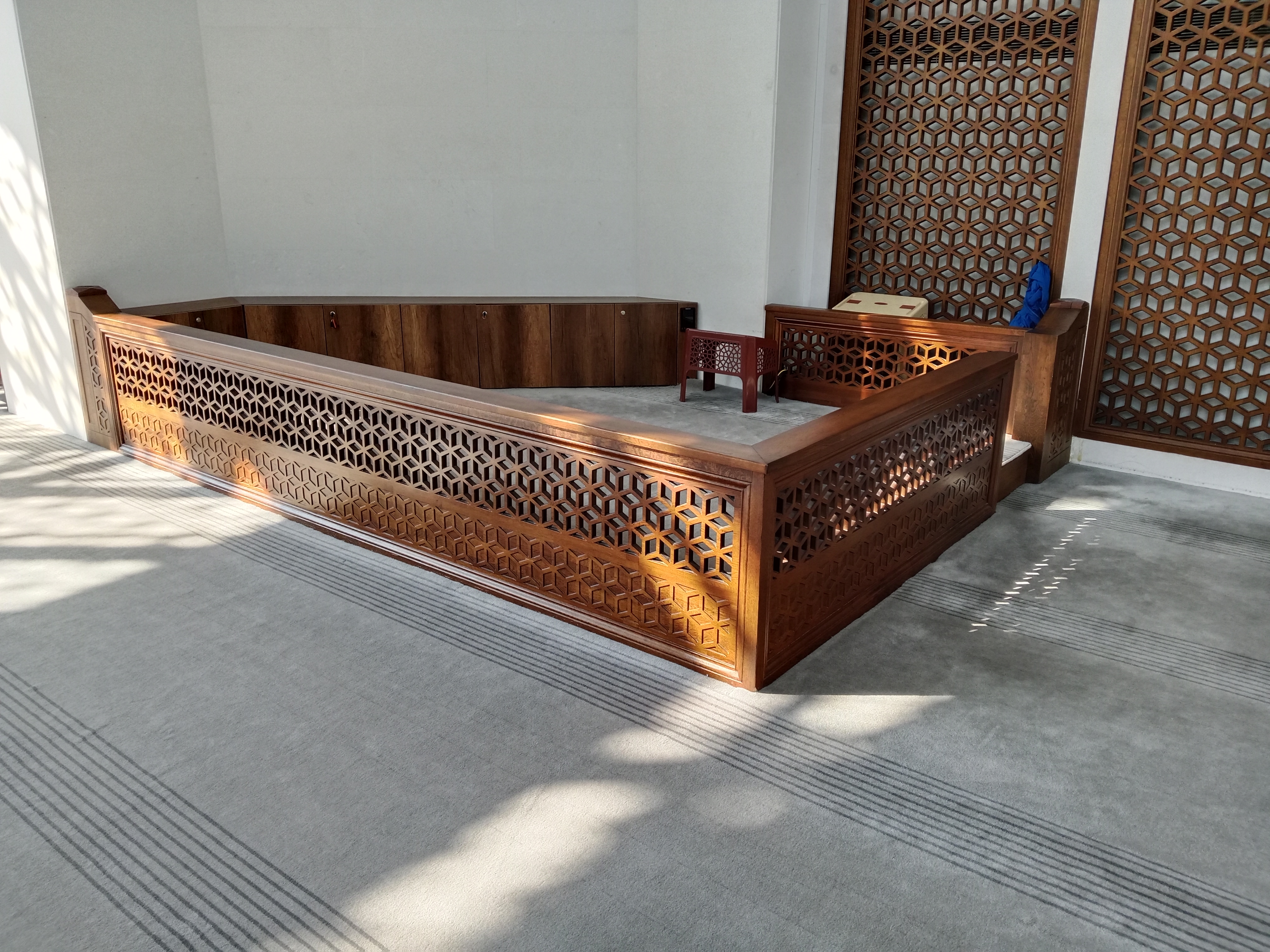
Muezzin's platform

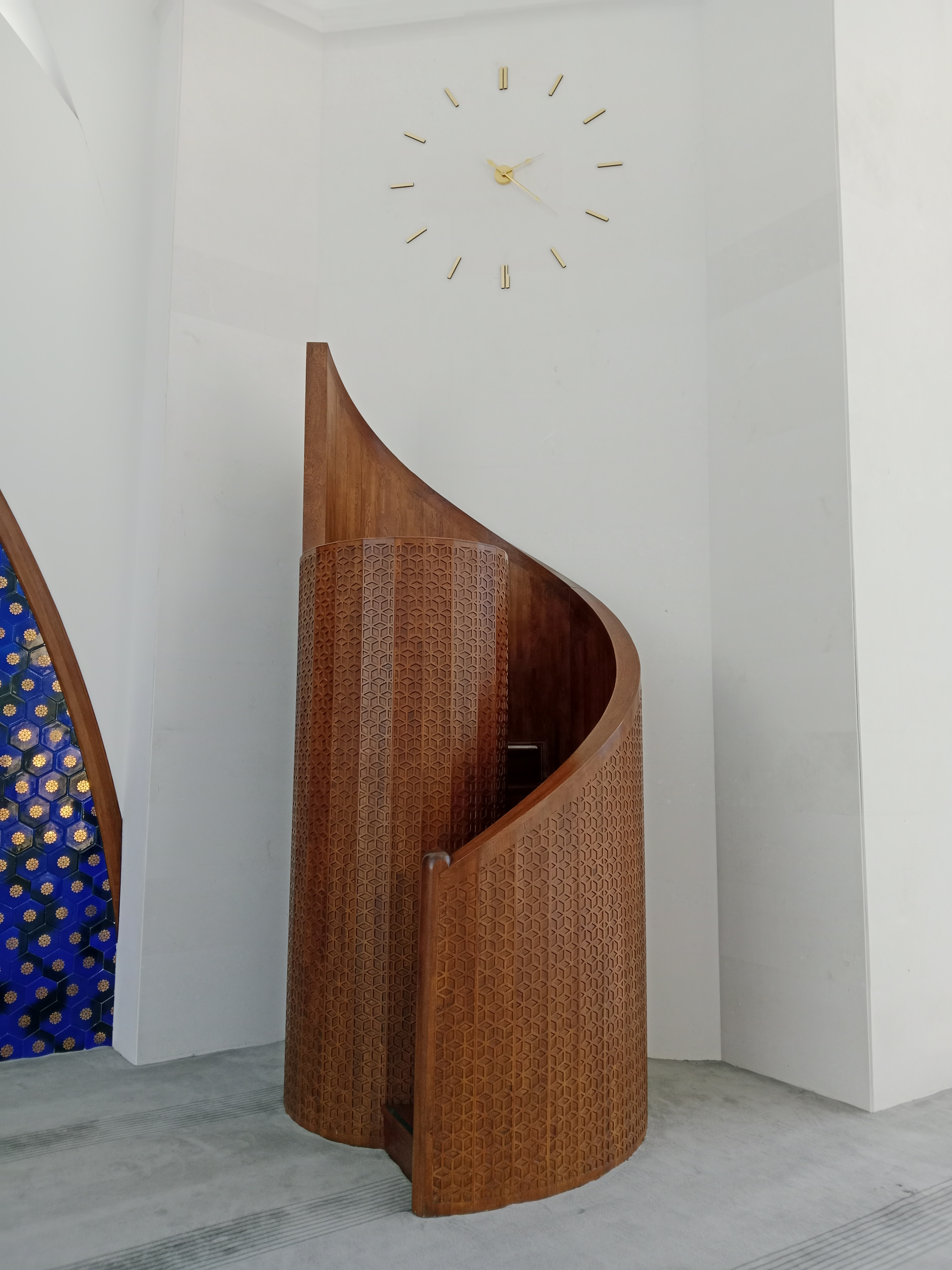
Minbar

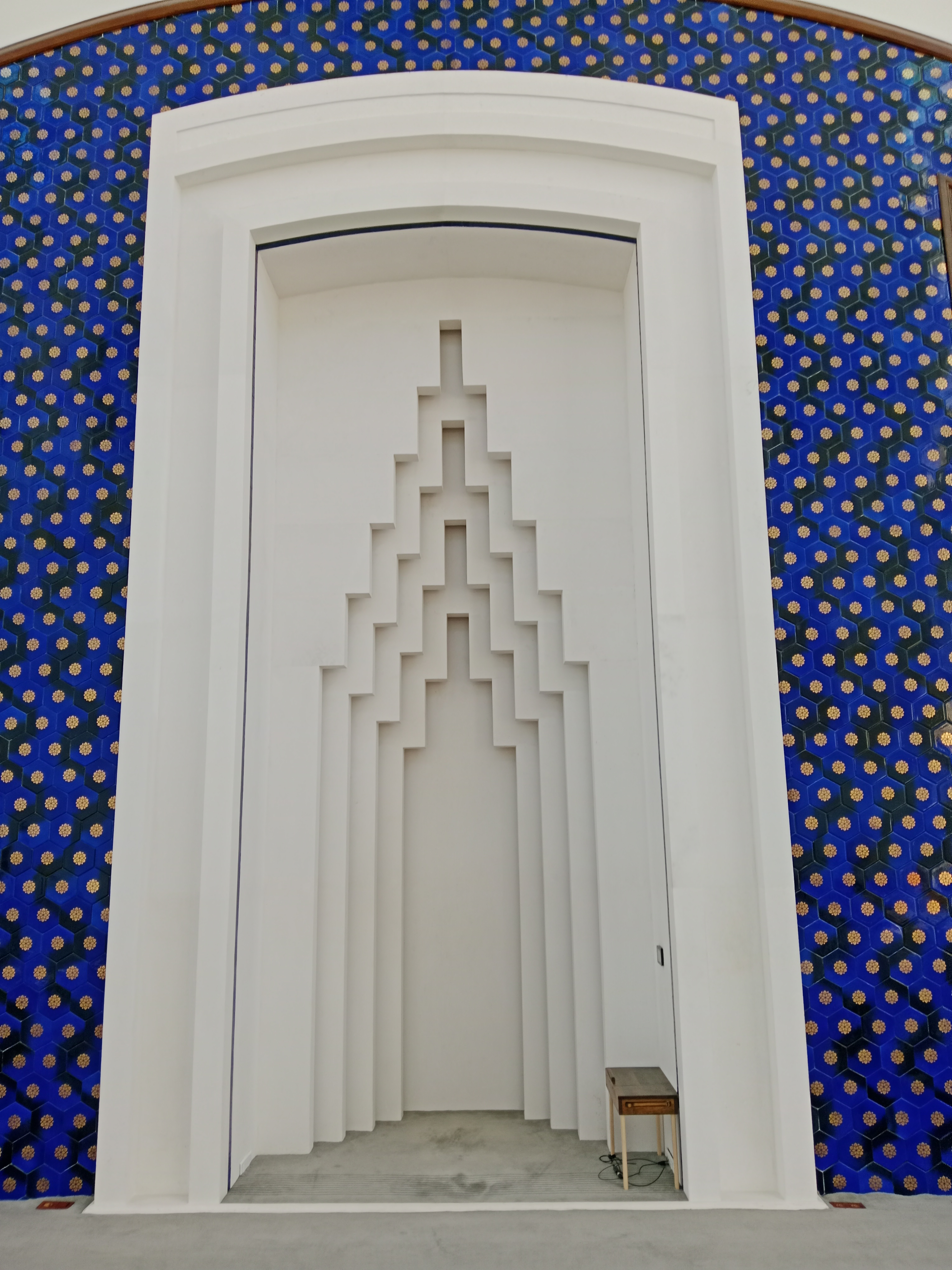
Mihrab

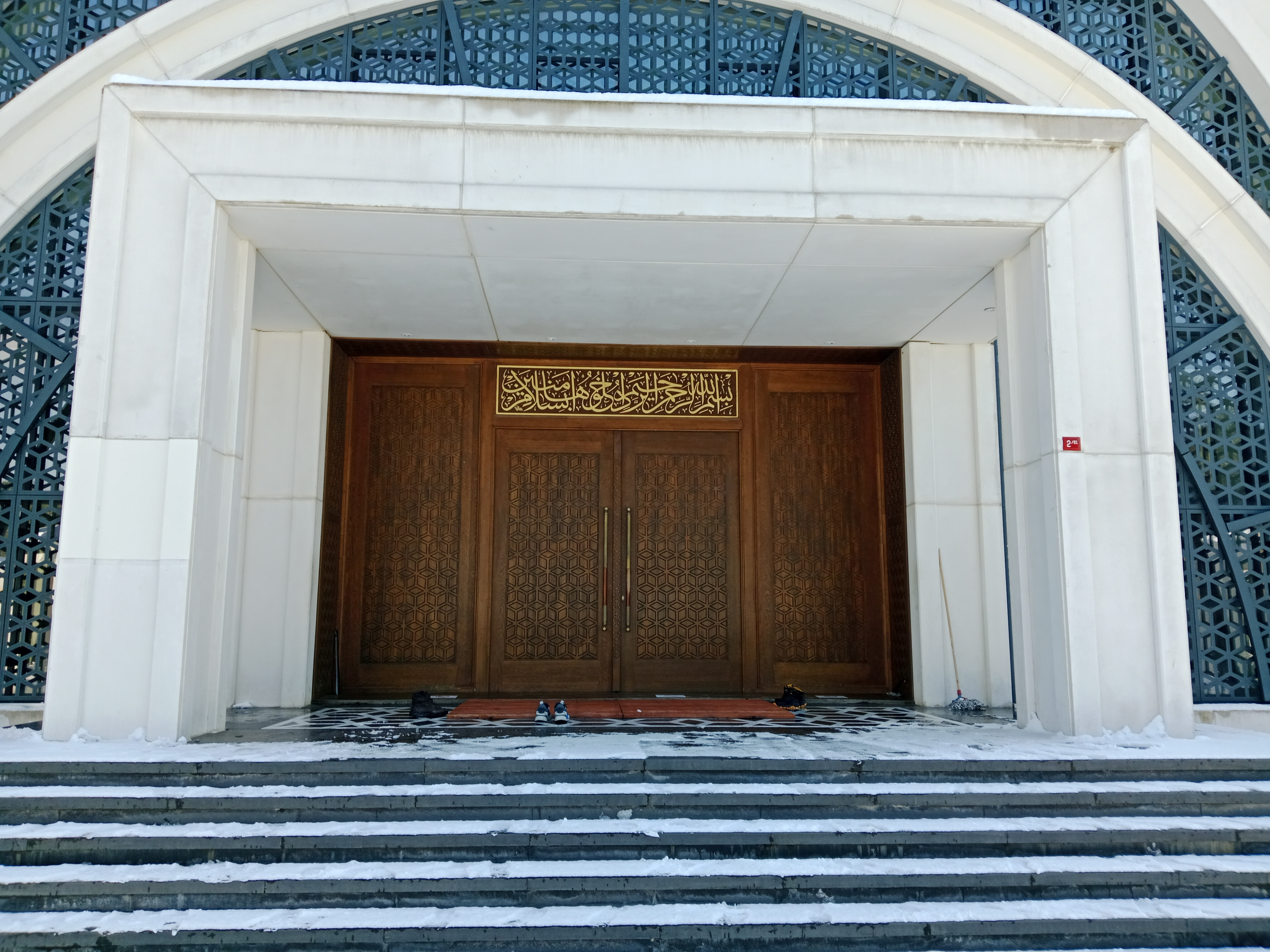
Main gate

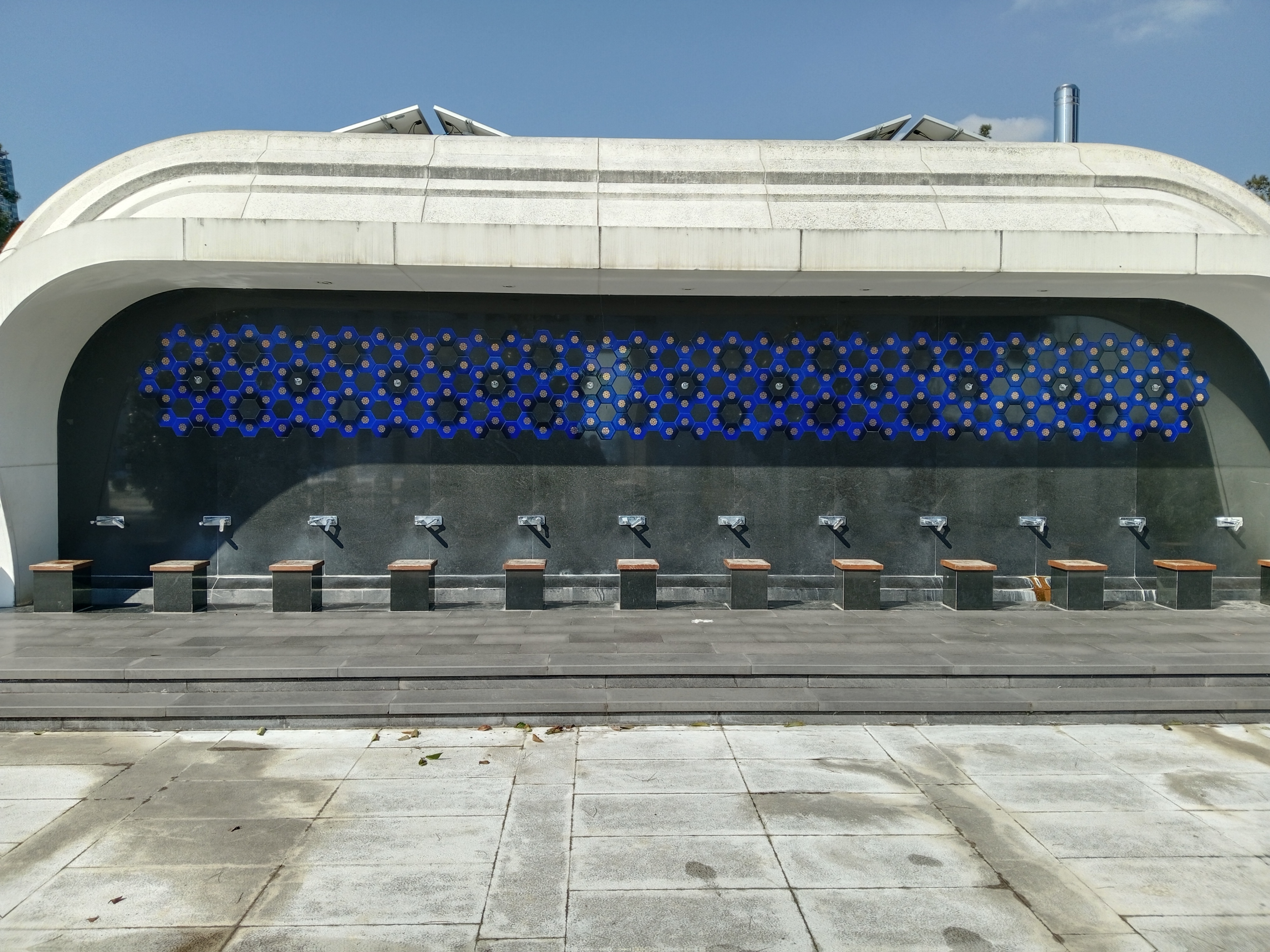
Washroom

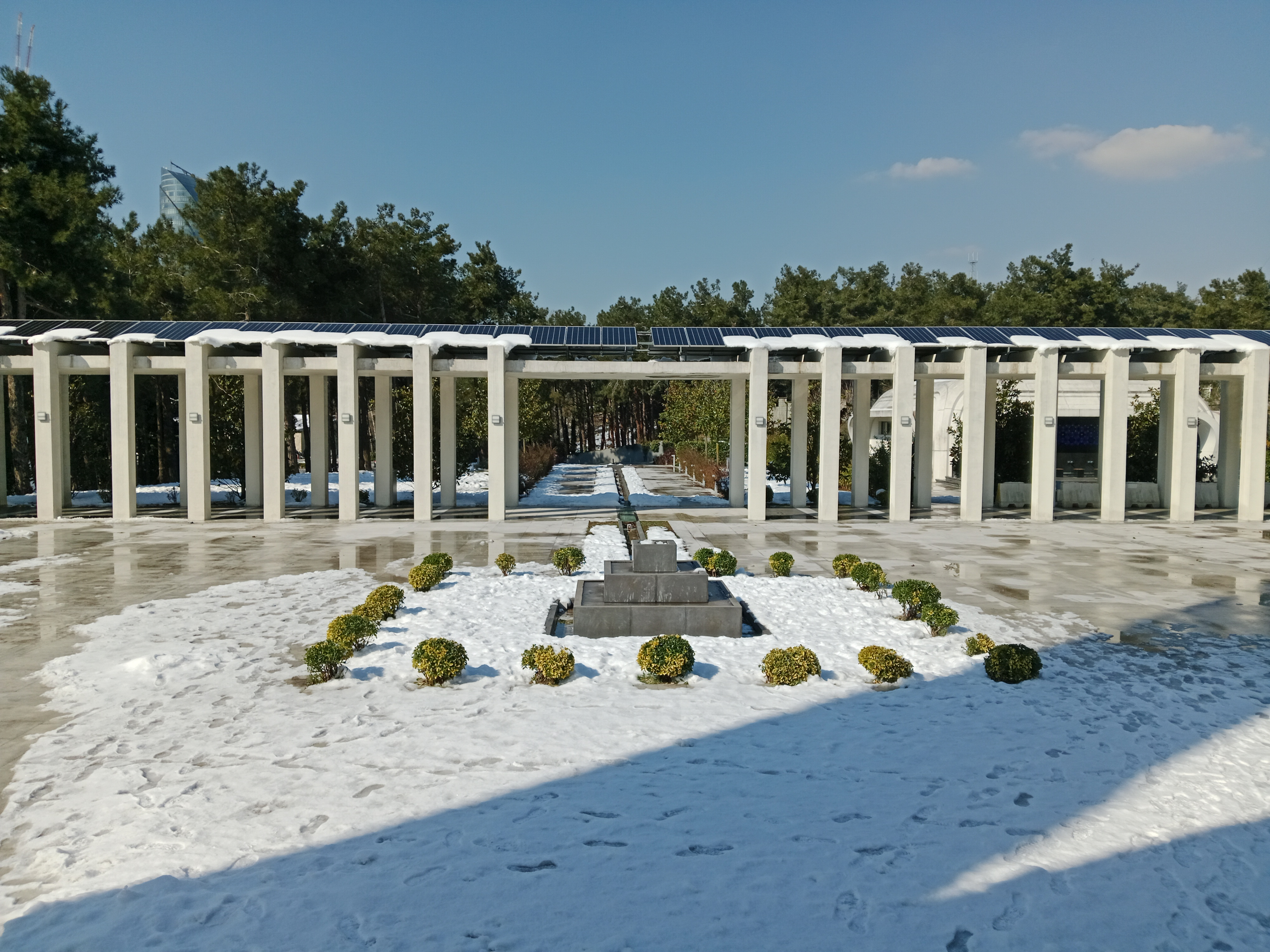
Courtyard

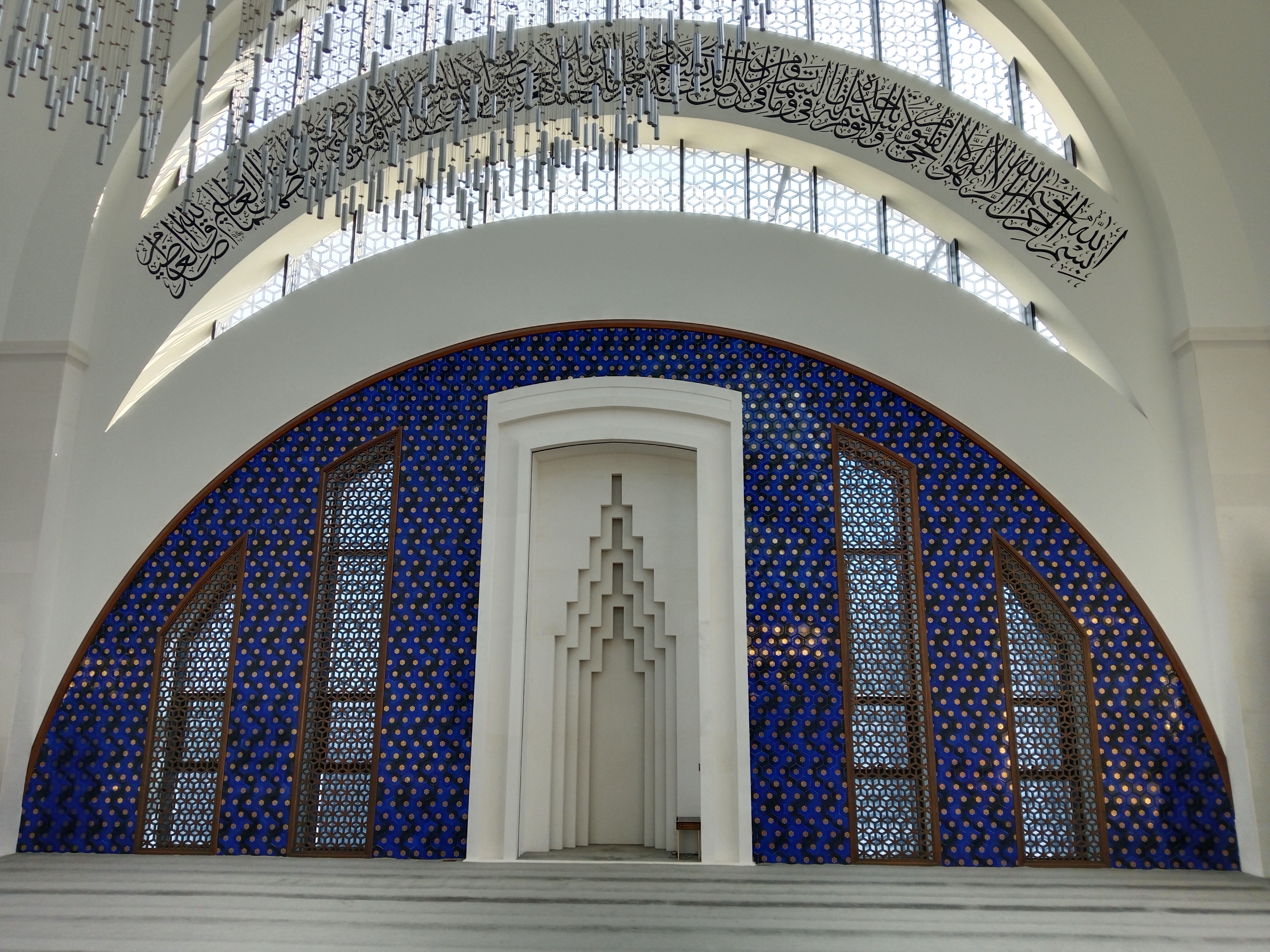
Front wall

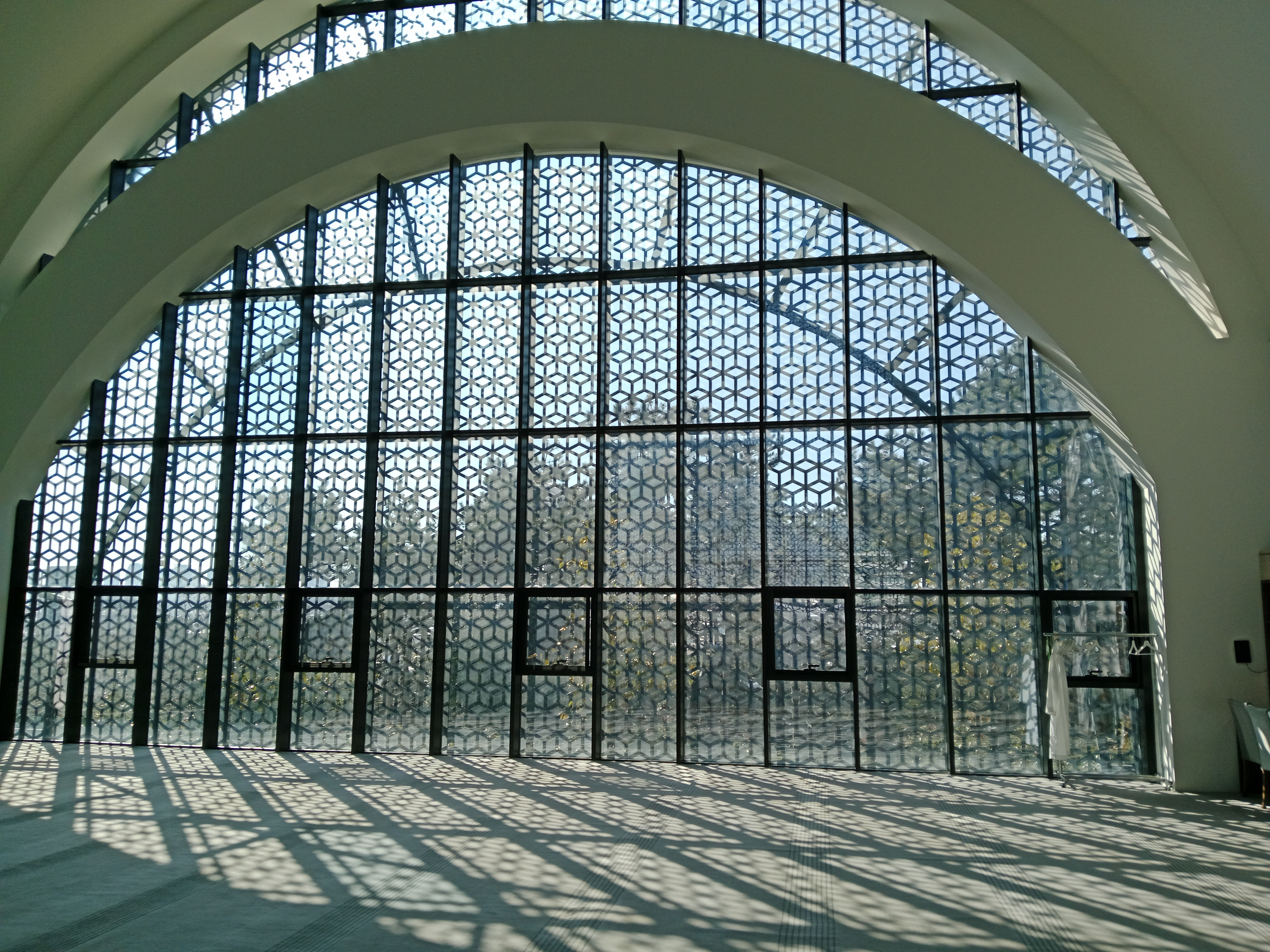
Side wall

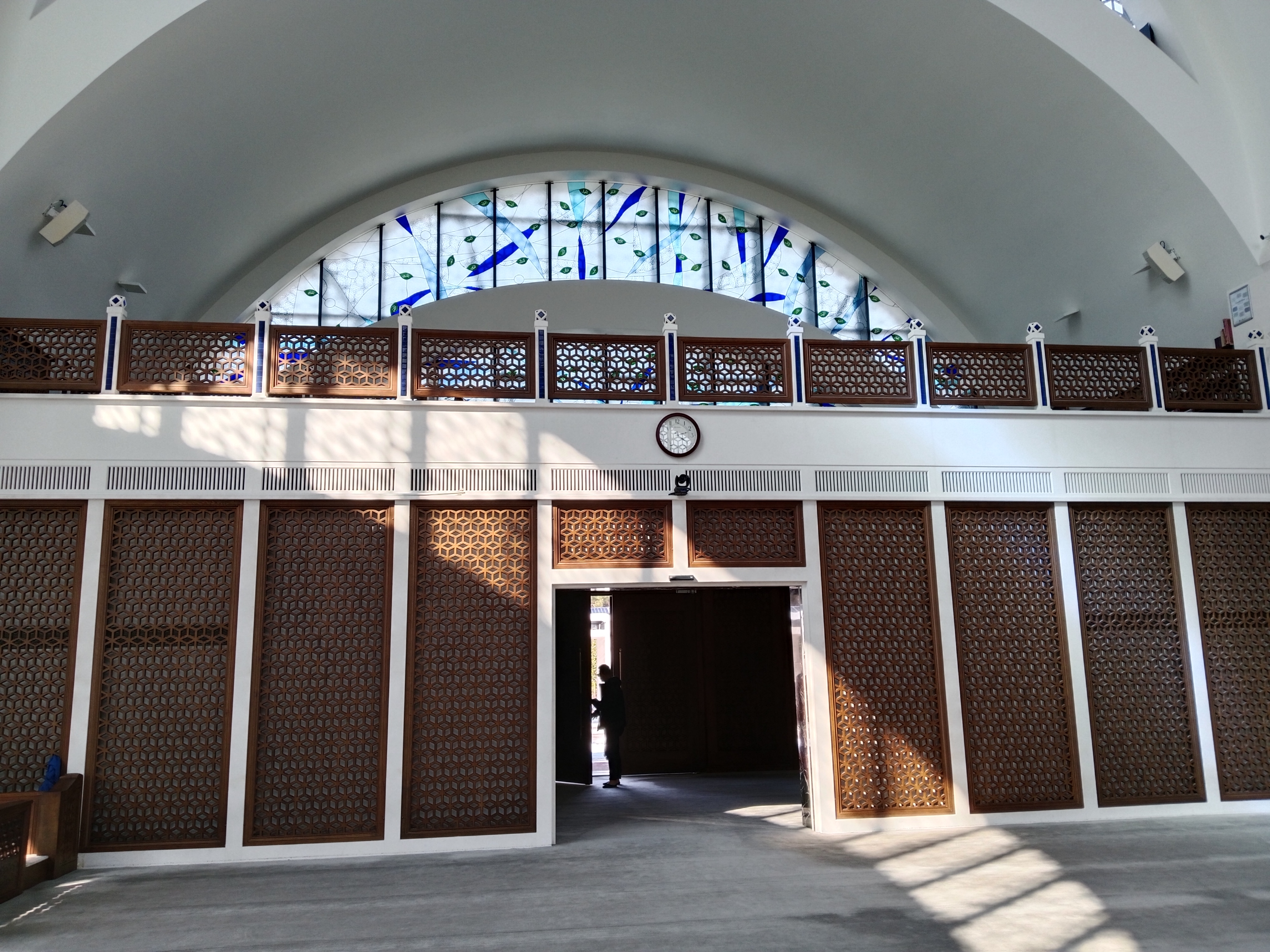
View of top floor from middle floor
