= İ.T.Ü.–Ayazağa station =

Station of the Istanbul Metro

İTÜ—Ayazağa
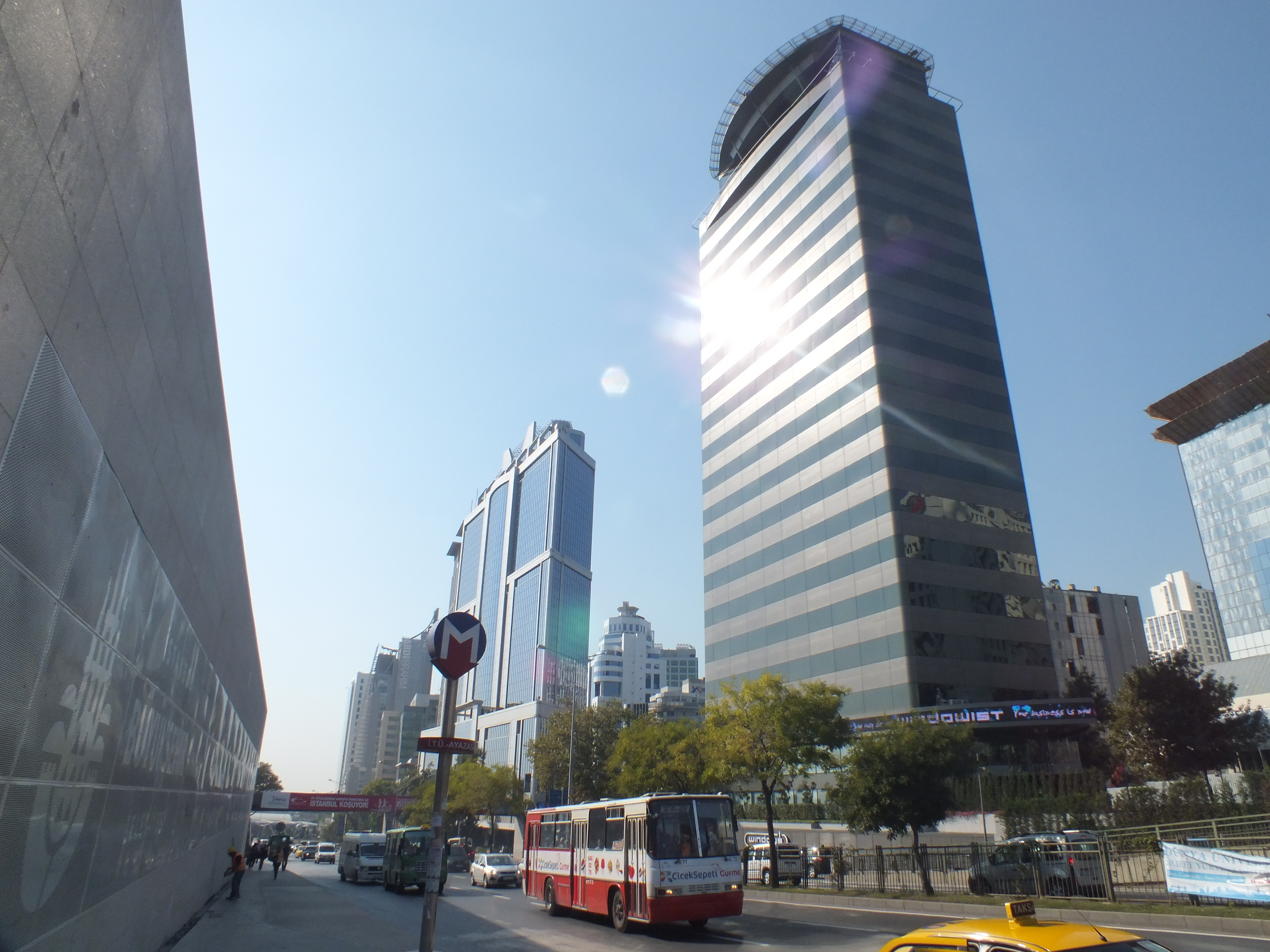
- The Istanbul Metro sign with the skyscrapers of Maslak.

General information
- Location: Büyükdere Cd., Reşitpaşa Mah., 34467; Sarıyer, Istanbul
- Coordinates: 41.1302°N 29.0250°E
- Owner: Istanbul Metropolitan Municipality
- Operator: Metro Istanbul
- Line: M2
- Platforms: 1 Island platform
- Tracks: 2
- Connections: İETT Bus: 25G, 29, 29A, 29B, 29C, 29D, 29E, 29GM, 29P, 29Ş, 40B, 41, 41C, 41N, 42, 42M, 50H, 59RK, 59RS, 62H, D2; Istanbul Minibus: 4. Levent-Darüşşafaka, Ayazağa-Zincirlikuyu, Baltalimanı-Reşitpaşa-4. Levent, Beşiktaş-Tarabya, Sarıyer-Beşiktaş, Zincirlikuyu-Bahçeköy, Zincirlikuyu-Pınar Mahallesi, Çırçırtepe-Ayazağa

Construction
- Structure type: Underground
- Accessible: Yes

History
- Opened: 31 January 2009
- Electrified: 750V DC Third rail

Services
Preceding station	Istanbul Metro	Following station
Sanayi Mahallesi towards Yenikapı	M2 Line	Atatürk Oto Sanayi towards Hacıosman
Location

İTÜ—Ayazağa is an underground rapid transit station on the M2 line of the Istanbul Metro. It is located under Büyükdere Avenue in Maslak, the second largest financial district in Istanbul after Levent. The station services the Istanbul Technical University (Turkish: İstanbul Teknik Üniversitesi) or İTÜ as well as the Maslak financial district. İ.T.Ü.-Ayazağa has an island platform serviced by two tracks. The station was opened on 31 January 2009 as part of the northern extension of the M2 line.

== Layout ==
Southbound	← toward Yenikapı
Island platform
Northbound	toward Hacıosman →
