= Rams Beyond =

Etro Residences Istanbul
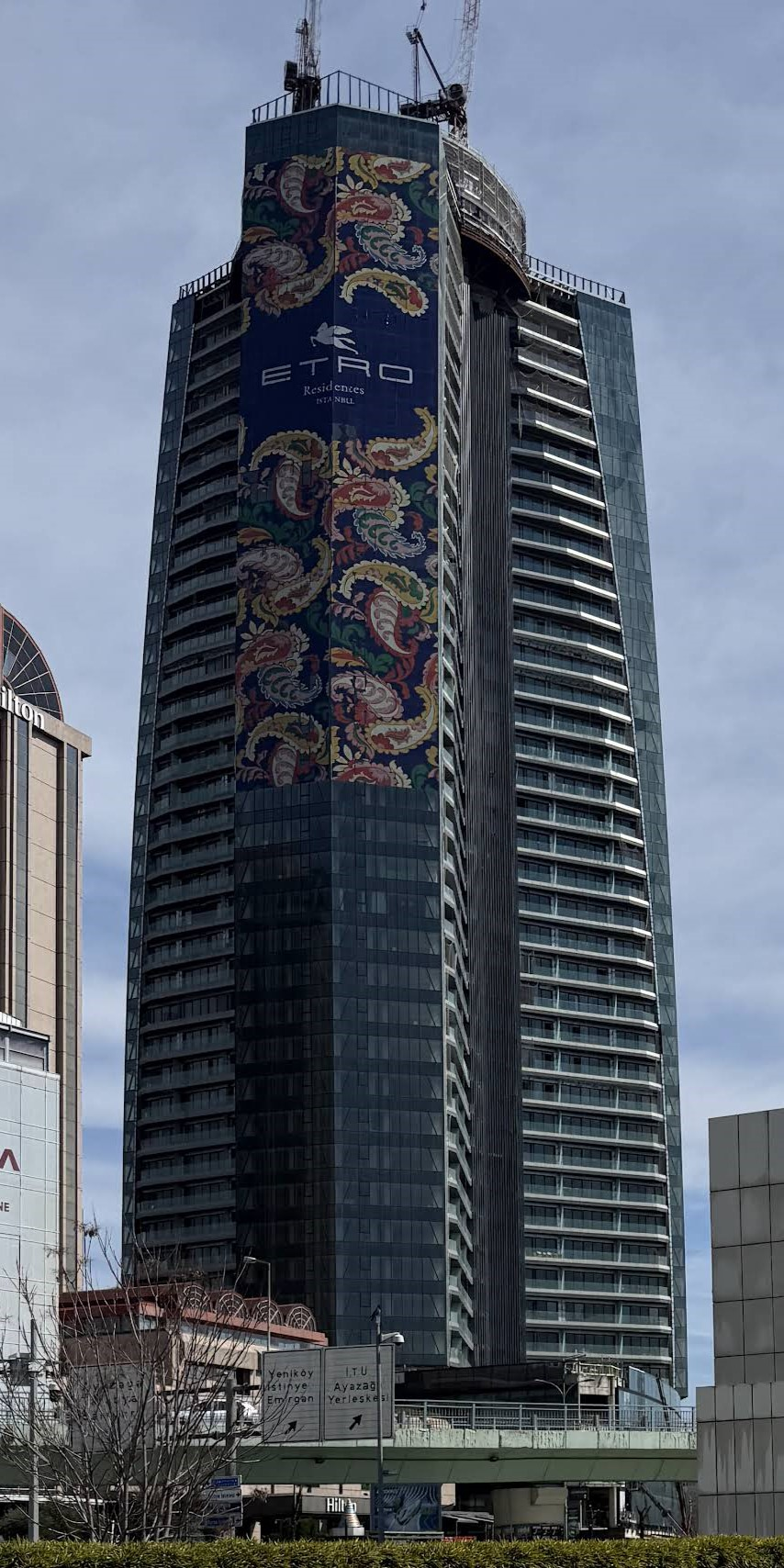
- As of April 2025, renamed as Rams Beyond.
- Interactive map of the Etro Residences Istanbul area

General information
- Status: Under construction
- Type: Mixed use
- Location: Büyükdere Avenue Maslak, Istanbul, Turkey
- Coordinates: 41°06′34″N 29°01′26″E
- Construction started: 2002 (restarted construction in 2022)
- Opening: 2026
- Cost: US$240,000,000

Height
- Roof: 178 m (584 ft)

Technical details
- Floor count: 40 (above ground level)

Design and construction
- Architect: Dome Architecture
- Developer: Rams Turkey

Etro Residences-Rams Beyond (formerly known as Diamond of Istanbul) is the tallest building under construction in Istanbul, Turkey, being built on the Büyükdere Avenue in the city's Maslak central business district of Sarıyer. When completed, it will rise 40 floors above ground level and reach an above-ground height of 178 meters.

Designed by Istanbul-based Dome + Partners with structural engineering by the world-renowned Thornton Tomasetti, the project features a steel construction framework connected to a central reinforced concrete elevator core. Evolving from its original design of three separate towers with varying heights, the building has been unified into a single, iconic silhouette standing 178 meters tall, reflecting the modern dynamism of the city.

The magnificent structure, which has a total of 40 floors above ground, primarily houses the luxury ETRO Residences (ranging from 1-bedroom to 4-bedroom layouts), all infused with signature Italian aesthetic. At the pinnacle of the building, residents have access to an infinity pool with panoramic views of the Bosphorus, as well as a helipad. The steel framework rises from a common podium that includes a boutique shopping mall featuring premium brands, a Michelin-starred restaurant, co-working spaces, and a direct metro connection. The complex also features 9 basement floors below ground level, designed to accommodate a spacious indoor parking garage and technical facilities.

== Construction work ==
The construction of the project began in February 2002 with the start of demolition of an old nine-floor office building on the plot. The tower's steel beams began assembly in 2006.

The total area of the construction site comprises around 14,000 m^{2}.

Due to the space limitations around the construction site - the site is situated on one of the busiest transport arteries of Istanbul, Buyukdere Avenue - and to minimize the impact of construction activities on the traffic, all concrete pouring activities using concrete mixer trucks are performed at night.

As of April 2012, the project is on hold.

The companies involved in the development and construction of the project are:

- Hattat Holding – investor company, Istanbul, company web site,
- Dome Architecture – the project's architectural design, Istanbul, company web site,
- Hattat İnşaat – construction subsidiary of Hattat Holding and the project's main construction company, Istanbul,
- MG İnşaat – construction roughworks subcontractor of the project, Istanbul,
- Burak Hafriyat – foundation excavation of the project, Istanbul, company web site,
- Thornton-Tomasetti Engineers – the structural design of the tower's steel wings, New Jersey, U.S., company web site,
- Tuncel Mühendislik – project's static design, Istanbul, company web site,
- Arcelor Commercial Sections S.A. – production of the steel columns and beams of the project's steel wings, Luxembourg, company web site,
- Tabosan – final processing of the Arcelor-produced steel columns and beams and their on-site installation, Istanbul, company web site,
- Samko – specialized consultant for the on-site assembly of the steel columns and beams, Istanbul, company web site,
- Tanrıöver Mühendislik – mechanical engineering, Istanbul, company web site,
- OYAK Beton and Nuh Beton – companies providing ready-mix concrete to the construction site.

== See also ==
- Istanbul
- List of tallest buildings in Istanbul
