= M2 (Istanbul Metro) =

Istanbul Metro line

M2 Yenikapı–Hacıosman
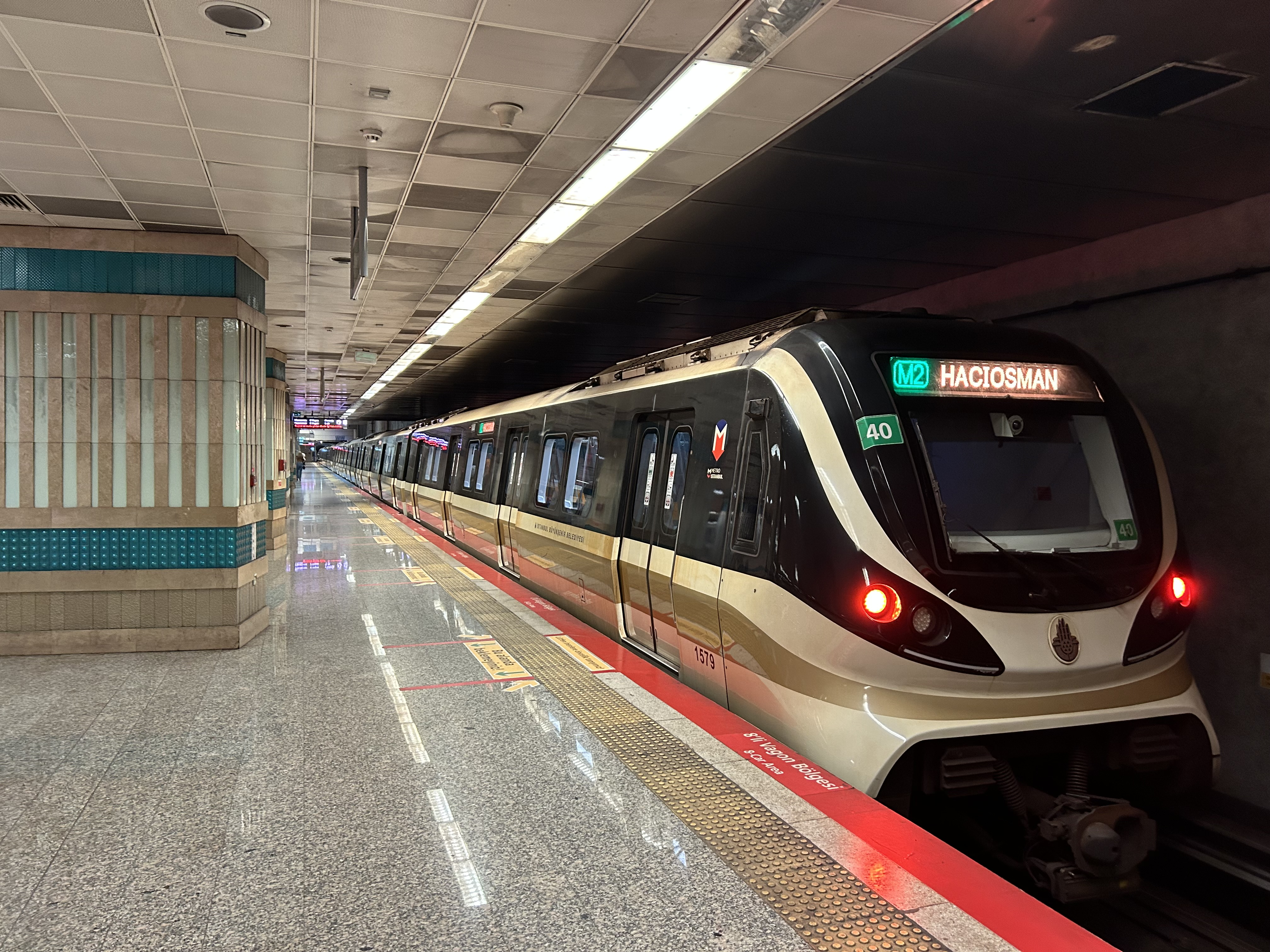
- A northbound train at Yenikapı station

Overview
- Status: Operational; Yenikapı - Hacıosman; Seyrantepe - Sanayi Mah. (Branch)
- Owner: Istanbul Metropolitan Municipality
- Locale: Istanbul, Turkey
- Termini: Yenikapı; Hacıosman
- Stations: 16

Service
- Type: Rapid transit
- System: Istanbul Metro
- Services: 1 (plus shuttle to Seyrantepe)
- Route number: M2, M2 Shuttle
- Operator: Metro Istanbul A.Ş.
- Depot: Seyrantepe
- Rolling stock: 160 Hyundai Rotem; 20 Alstom; 8 carriages per trainset (weekdays); 4 carriages per trainset (weekend)
- Daily ridership: 500,000

History
- Opened: 16 September 2000; 26 years ago
- Last extension: 2014

Technical
- Line length: 23.49 km (14.60 mi)
- Number of tracks: 2
- Track gauge: 1,435 mm (4 ft 8 1/2 in) standard gauge
- Electrification: 750 V DC Third rail

The M2, officially referred to as the M2 Yenikapı–Hacıosman metro line (Turkish: M2 Yenikapı–Hacıosman metro hattı), is a rapid transit line of the Istanbul Metro and the first heavy metro of Istanbul and Turkey. It is colored light green on the maps and route signs. The M2 operates between Hacıosman in southern Sarıyer to Yenikapı in south-central Fatih on the historic peninsula of Istanbul. Shuttle trains run from Sanayi Mahallesi to Seyrantepe to Rams Park. The M2 line has 16 stations, all but one underground, and a total length of 23.49 kilometers (14.60 mi). A daily ridership of about 500,000 makes it the busiest line of the Istanbul Metro system.

== History ==
Construction for a north–south metro line started on 19 August 1992 when the groundbreaking of the M2 took place. The original route was a wholly underground 7 km (4.3 mi) line between Taksim and 4. Levent. Construction of the tunnels took place in three separate areas; Taksim, Şişli and 4. Levent. These tunnels were connected to each other on 8 July 1994 and were completed on 30 April 1995. The line was completed in early 11 January 1999 and the first rolling stock were lowered into the tunnels. On 25 March 1999, the first test runs began, and the line entered service on 16 September 2000 between Taksim and Levent. "4. Levent" was opened one month later on 24 October 2000.

On 15 October 2021, it was announced that İBB's free Wi-Fi service had started on rolling stock serving on the line. In addition, 384 USB charging ports were installed in 192 trains serving on the line.

=== Timeline ===
The following are events in the timeline of the M2 service:

- 19 August 1992: Construction of the M2 begins.
- 12 June 1994: Taksim - Şişli part is completed.
- 8 July 1994: Şişli - 4.Levent part is completed.
- 30 April 1995: The two tunnels are connected.
- 11 January 1999: The first trainsets are used for test runs.
- 16 September 2000: Taksim - 4.Levent portion is opened.
- 31 January 2009: Taksim - Şişhane and 4.Levent - Atatürk Oto Sanayi extensions are opened.
- 2 September 2010: A northern extension to Darüşşafaka is opened.
- 11 November 2010: The branch to Seyrantepe is opened.
- 9 July 2011: The northern extension to Hacıosman is opened.
- 15 February 2014: With the completion of the Golden Horn Metro Bridge, M2 line is fully in service from Yenikapı to Hacıosman.

== Route ==
M2 route diagram

The M2 starts at Hacıosman in southwestern Sarıyer. From there it travels under Büyükdere Avenue, a major north–south road in the city, through İstanbul's two major financial districts; Maslak and Levent. The line then heads slightly west just south of Levent through Şişli to historical Taksim Square. From there M2 heads through western Beyoğlu to Şişhane. It crosses the Golden Horn towards the Old City and terminates in Yenikapı, a transport hub connecting with M1 line and Marmaray.

== Stations ==
=== M2 Line ===
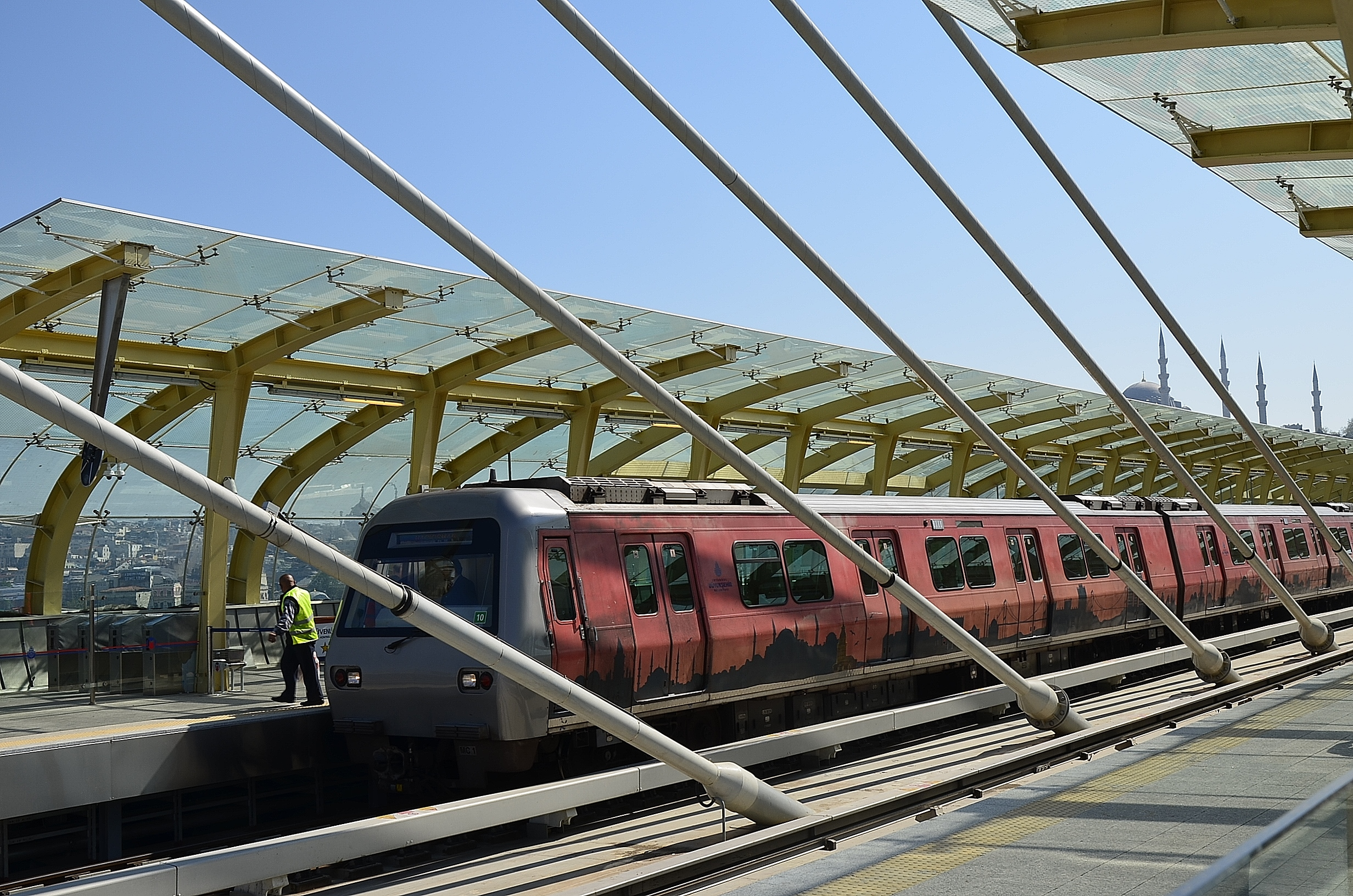
Istanbul Metro line M2 train crossing the Golden Horn Metro Bridge.

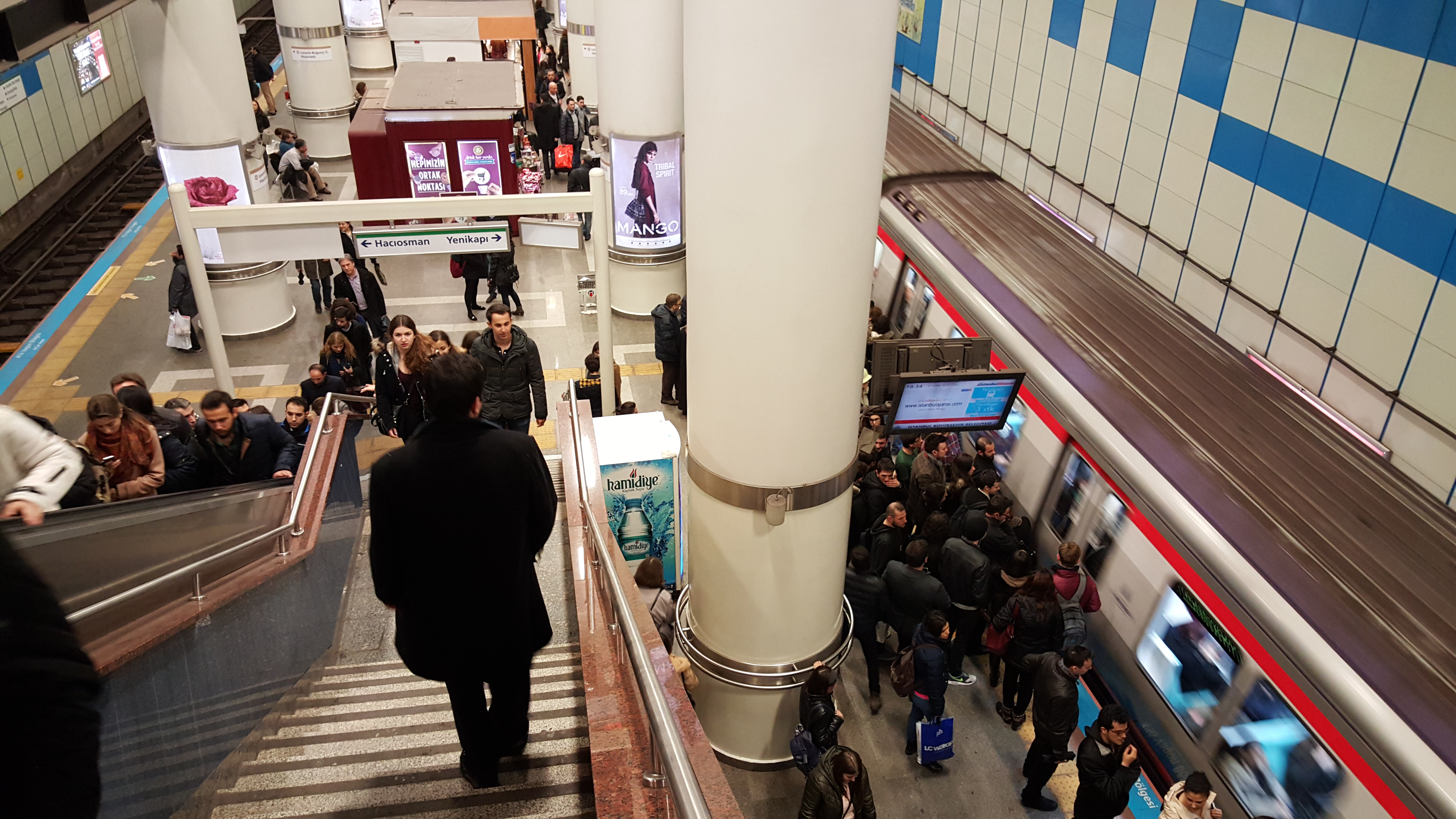
M2 Levent station.

No	Station	District	Transfer	Type	Notes
1	Sefaköy	Küçükçekmece	(planned)・ İETT Bus: 73B, 73F, 73H, 76, 76B, 76C, 76D, 76Y, 79Y, 89, 89A, 89B, 89K, 89S, 98, 98AB, 98S, 98TB, 146, AVR1A, HT20, KÇ2	Underground	
2	Çobançeşme	Bahçelievler	İETT Bus: 31, 31E, 31K, 36AY, 73Y, 76V, 78B, 79F, 79FY, 79G, 79K, 79Ş, 82, 82S, 89M, 89YB, 98B, 98H, 98MB, 98T, E-57, HT10, HT11	Underground	Kuyumcukent・Turkish Exporters Assembly・Bahçelievler Municipality Additional Service Building・IMM Solid Waste Facilities・IMM Road Maintenance 2nd Regional Office
3	Zafer	Bahçelievler	İETT Bus:	Underground	
4	Siyavuşpaşa	Bahçelievler	İETT Bus:	Underground	
5	Adnan Kahveci	Bahçelievler	İETT Bus:	Underground	
6	İncirli	Bakırköy	・・・İncirli–Söğütlüçeşme Metro Project; İETT Bus: 31, 31E, 50B, 71T, 72T, 73, 73F, 76D, 78ZB, 79G, 79Ş, 82, 89, 89A, 89B, 89K, 89M, 89S, 92, 94, 94A, 94Y, 97, 97A, 97BT, 97E, 97KZ, 97T, H-9, HT13, MK97	Underground	Bakirkoy Palace of Justice
7	Osmaniye	Bakırköy	İETT Bus: 94	Underground	
8	Zeytinburnu Adliye	Zeytinburnu	İETT Bus: 93, 93C, 93M, 93T	Underground	Zeytinburnu Square
9	Silivrikapı	Fatih	İETT Bus: 48A, 50K, 85C, 93, 93C, 93M, 93T	Underground	
10	Kocamustafapaşa	Fatih	İETT Bus: 35, 35A, 35C, 35D	Underground	Istanbul University - Cerrahpaşa
↑↑Planned to Open After 2030 ↑↑
11	Yenikapı	Fatih	・・・ (Yenikapı Terminal); İETT Bus: 30D, 31, 31Y, 50Y, 70FY, 70KY, 72YT, 76A, 77, 88A, 146T, 336Y	Underground	Aksaray Tram Station 750m Walking
12	Vezneciler	Fatih	(Laleli–Istanbul University station); İETT Bus: 36A, 36V, 37Y, 38B, 50V, 77A, 86V	Underground	Istanbul University Laleli & Vezneciler Campus・Şehzadebaşı Mosque・Süleymaniye Mosque
13	Haliç	-	(Küçükpazar station); İETT Bus: 26, 26A, 28, 28T, 30D, 31E, 32, 33, 33B, 33E, 33ES, 33TE, 33Y, 35, 36KE, 38E, 46Ç, 50E, 50P, 54E, 54TE, 66, 70D, 70FE, 70KE, 74, 74A, 77Ç, 78, 78H, 79E, 79GE, 82, 90, 92, 92C, 93, 97A, 97GE, 99A, 146B, 336, 336E, EM1, EM2	Bridge	Haliç Metro Bridge・Atatürk Bridge・Sokullu Mehmet Paşa Mosque
14	Şişhane	Beyoğlu	(Beyoğlu station)・ (Tünel station); İETT Bus: 32T, 35C, 36T, 46Ç, 46T, 50E, 50G, 50N, 54E, 54HT, 54TE, 55G, 55T, 66, 70FE, 70FY, 70KY, 71T, 72T, 72YT, 73, 73F, 74, 74A, 76D, 77, 77A, 77Ç, 79T, 80T, 85T, 87, 89C, 89T, 92T, 93T, 97BT, 97T, 145T, E-56, E-59, EM1, EM2	Underground	İstiklal Avenue・Zemin İstanbul・Galata Tower・Kasımpaşa
15	Taksim	Beyoğlu	・ İETT Bus: 25G, 32T, 35C, 36T, 37T, 40, 40T, 46Ç, 46T, 48N, 48T, 50G, 50N, 50T, 54Ç, 54E, 54HT, 54K, 54ÖR, 54P, 54T, 54TE, 55ET, 55G, 55T, 66, 69A, 70FE, 70FY, 70KE, 70KY, 71T, 72T, 72YT, 73, 73F, 74, 74A, 76D, 79T, 80T, 85T, 87, 89C, 89T, 92T, 93T, 97BT, 97T, 129T, 145T, 256, 559C, DT1, DT2, E-56, E-59	Underground	Taksim Square・Taksim Mosque・Taksim Gezi Park・Atatürk Culturel Center・İstiklal Avenue・About 1 km from Taşkışla station.
16	Osmanbey	Şişli	İETT Bus: 25G, 30A, 30M, 46Ç, 46T, 48N, 54Ç, 54E, 54K, 54ÖR, 54P, 54T, 66, 70D, 70FE, 70FY, 70KE, 70KY, 74, 74A, 256, DT1, DT2	Underground	Pangaltı・Nişantaşı
17	Şişli - Mecidiyeköy	Şişli	・ İETT Bus: 25G, 27T, 29Ş, 30A, 30M, 32M, 33M, 33TM, 36M, 41AT, 46Ç, 46KT, 46T, 48, 48F, 48H, 48N, 48S, 49G, 49GB, 50C, 50M, 50S, 54Ç, 54E, 54HŞ, 54K, 54ÖR, 54P, 54T, 55, 59A, 59B, 59CH, 59K, 59N, 59R, 59UÇ, 64Ç, 65G, 66, 74, 74A, 750, 77, 77A, 79KM, 79M, 92M, 92Ş, 93M, 97M, 121A, 121B, 121BS, 122C, 122D, 122Y, 141A, 141M, 146E, 146M, 251, 252, 522, 522B, 522ST, 622, DT1, DT2, E-58, H-2, HM3, HM4, K4	Underground	Cevahir AVM・Profilo AVM・Trump Towers・Şişli Mosque・Mecidiyeköy Square
18	Gayrettepe	Şişli	・ (Zincirlikuyu station); İETT Bus: 25G, 27E, 27SE, 27T, 29, 29A, 29C, 29D, 29İ, 29P, 29Ş, 30A, 30M, 36L, 40B, 41AT, 41E, 42, 42M, 42Z, 43R, 49Z, 50Z, 58A, 58N, 58S, 58UL, 59A, 59B, 59CH, 59K, 59N, 59R, 59S, 59UÇ, 62, 62G, 63, 64Ç, 65G, 121A, 121B, 121BS, 122B, 122C, 122D, 122Y, 251, 252, 256, 522, 522B, 522ST, 599C, 622, DT1, DT2, U1, U2	Underground	Zincirlikuyu・Zorlu Center・Astoria AVM
19	Levent	Beşiktaş & Şişli	İETT Bus: 25G, 27E, 27SE, 27T, 29, 29A, 29C, 29D, 29E, 29İ, 29P, 29Ş, 36L, 40B, 41AT, 41E, 42, 42M, 42Z, 49Z, 50Z, 62, 62G, 63, 64Ç, 65G, 121A, 121B, 121BS, 122B, 122C, 122D, 122Y, 522B, 522ST, 622	Underground	Metrocity・Kanyon・ÖzdilekPark・Gültepe・Levent Mosque・İş Kuleleri
20	4. Levent	Kâğıthane & Beşiktaş	(planned); İETT Bus: 25G, 27E, 27SE, 27T, 29, 29A, 29B, 29C, 29D, 29E, 29GM, 29P, 29Ş, 36G, 36L, 36Z, 40B, 41, 41A, 41AT, 41E, 41SM, 42, 42M, 48L, 49Z, 50F, 50Z, 500L, 500T, 59RK, 59RS, 65A, E-3, EL2	Underground	Istanbul Sapphire・Yeni Levent・QNB Finansbank Cristal Tower
21	Sanayi Mahallesi	Kâğıthane & Beşiktaş	M2 Shuttle Metro Line (free transfer); İETT Bus: 25G, 27E, 27SE, 27T, 29A, 29B, 29C, 29D, 29E, 29GM, 29P, 29Ş, 36G, 36L, 36Z, 40B, 41, 41A, 41AT, 41E, 41SM, 42, 42M, 48L, 49Z, 50F, 50Z, 59RK, 59RS, 62H, 65A, 500L, D2	Underground	It is possible to go to the Seyrantepe M2 branch line by changing the platform.
22	İTÜ–Ayazağa	Sarıyer	İTÜ - İstinye Funicular Line (planned); İETT Bus: 25G, 29, 29A, 29B, 29C, 29D, 29E, 29GM, 29P, 29Ş, 40B, 41, 41C, 41N, 42, 42M, 47L, 50H, 59RK, 59RS, 62H, D2	Underground	Istanbul Technical University (İTÜ) Ayazağa Campus・Maslak
23	Atatürk Oto Sanayi	Sarıyer	İETT Bus: 25G, 29A, 29C, 29D, 29GM, 41, 42M, 47L, 50H, 59RK, 59RS, 62H, D2	Underground	Formerly known as Vodafone Station under a sponsorship deal.
24	Darüşşafaka	Sarıyer	İETT Bus: 25G, 29C, 29D, 29T, 41, 42M, 47L, 50H, 59RK, 59RS, 62H, D2	Underground	Darüşşafaka・Atatürk Urban Forest (South entrance)
25	Hacıosman	Sarıyer	İETT Bus: 150, 151, 152, 154, 25, 25A, 25S, 25S, 25Y, 29C, 29D. 29M2, 29M1, 42Z, 47L, 48D, 50H, 59HS, 59RH, 62H, H-8, HM1	Underground	Atatürk Urban Forest (North entrance)
↓↓ Planned to Open After 2030 ↓↓
26	Çayırbaşı	Sarıyer	İETT Bus: 25, 25A, 25C, 25E, 25G, 25S1, 25S2 25Y, 40, 40B, 41, 41C, 41SF, 42, 42HM, 42K, 42M, 42T, 42Z, 48D, 151, 152, 153, 154, HM1	Underground	
27	Büyükdere	Sarıyer	İETT Bus: 25, 25A, 25E, 25G, 25S2, 25Y, 40, 40B, 41, 41C, 41SF, 42K, 42KT, 59RS, 150, 151, 152, 153, 154, HM1	Underground	Büyükdere jetty
28	Sarıyer	Sarıyer	İETT Bus: 25, 25A, 25E, 25G, 25S2, 25Y, 40, 40B, 41, 41C, 41SF, 42K, 42KT, 59RS, 150, 151, 152, 153, 154	Underground	Sarıyer jetty

=== M2 Branch Line ===
While it was planned to be only a warehouse and operation center in Seyrantepe during the initial construction, it was built as a station to serve both the region and Rams Park. Due to the limited track crossing area, trains can only run as shuttles to Sanayi Mahallesi. There are arrangements for direct train services between Seyrantepe and Yenikapı on match days.

No	Station	District	Transfer	Type	Notes
1	Sanayi Mahallesi	Kağıthane	(free transfer); İETT Bus: 25G, 27E, 27SE, 27T, 29A, 29B, 29C, 29D, 29E, 29GM, 29P, 29Ş, 36G, 36L, 36Z, 40B, 41, 41A, 41AT, 41E, 41SM, 42, 42M, 47F, 48L, 49Z, 50F, 50Z, 59RK, 59RS, 62H, 65A, 500L, D2	Underground	It is possible to go in the direction of Yenikapı and Hacıosman by changing platforms.
2	Seyrantepe	Kağıthane	(free transfer) (Seyrantepe station); İETT Bus: 27SE, 41SM, 41ST, 62H, 65A	Underground	Rams Park・Police Housing
↓↓ Planned to Open After 2030 ↓↓
3	Hamidiye	Kâğıthane	İETT Bus: 48H, 48T, 62G, 62H, TM2, TM3	Underground	
4	Alibeyköy Cep Otogarı	Eyüpsultan	(Alibeyköy Cep Otogarı station); İETT Bus: TM5, TM11, TM17	Viaduct	Alibeyköy Cep Otogarı (coach station)・5. Levent
5	Çırçır	Eyüpsultan	İETT Bus: 50P, TM7	Underground	İBB Tevfik Aydeniz Sports Facilities

== Rolling stock ==
The M2 line in İstanbul uses both Hyundai Rotem (from 2009 and 2018) and Alstom (this was what was used when the line was opened; though they largely got handed over to M6 when that line got opened, these trains still get used at night and during rush hours.) trains which operate with headways of 5 minutes on the line. The Alstom trains used on this line are derived in design from the S1 through S5 + S8 series used on the Caracas Metro in Venezuela, though they have differences in internal furniture.

== Future extension ==
A future extension southwest of Yenikapı is planned, with five new stations at Kocamustafapaşa, Silivrikapı, Veliefendi, Zeytinburnu and Bakırköy. A northward extension from Hacıosman, with 3 new stations at Çayırbaşı, Büyükdere, and Sarıyer is also planned.

== Gallery ==
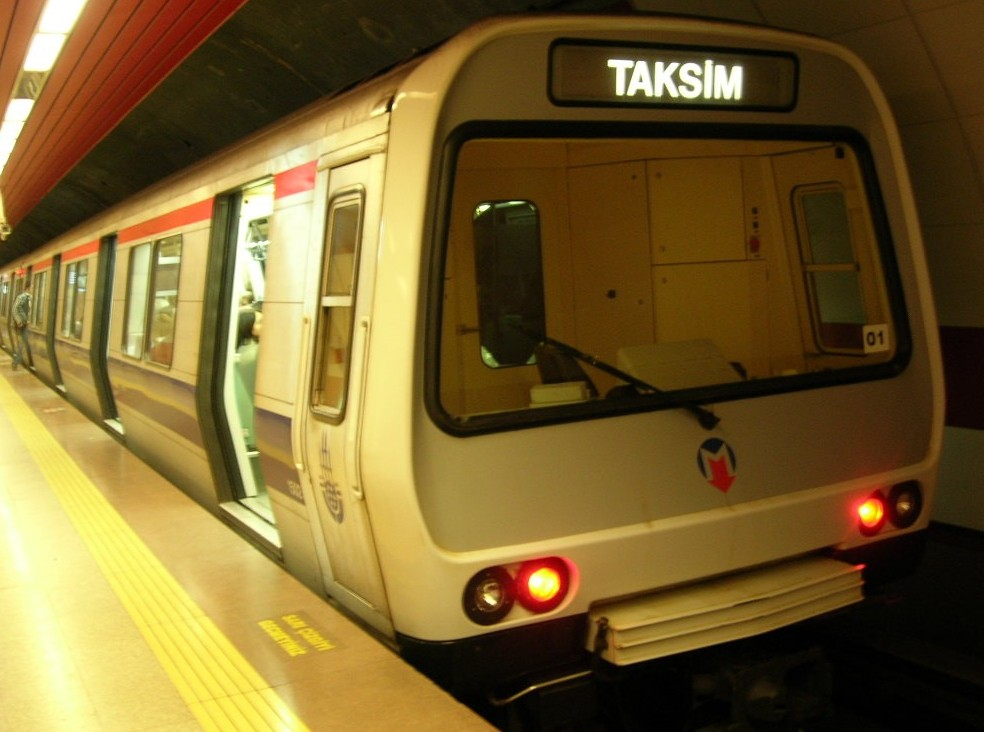
A trainset of Alstom cars at Taksim station

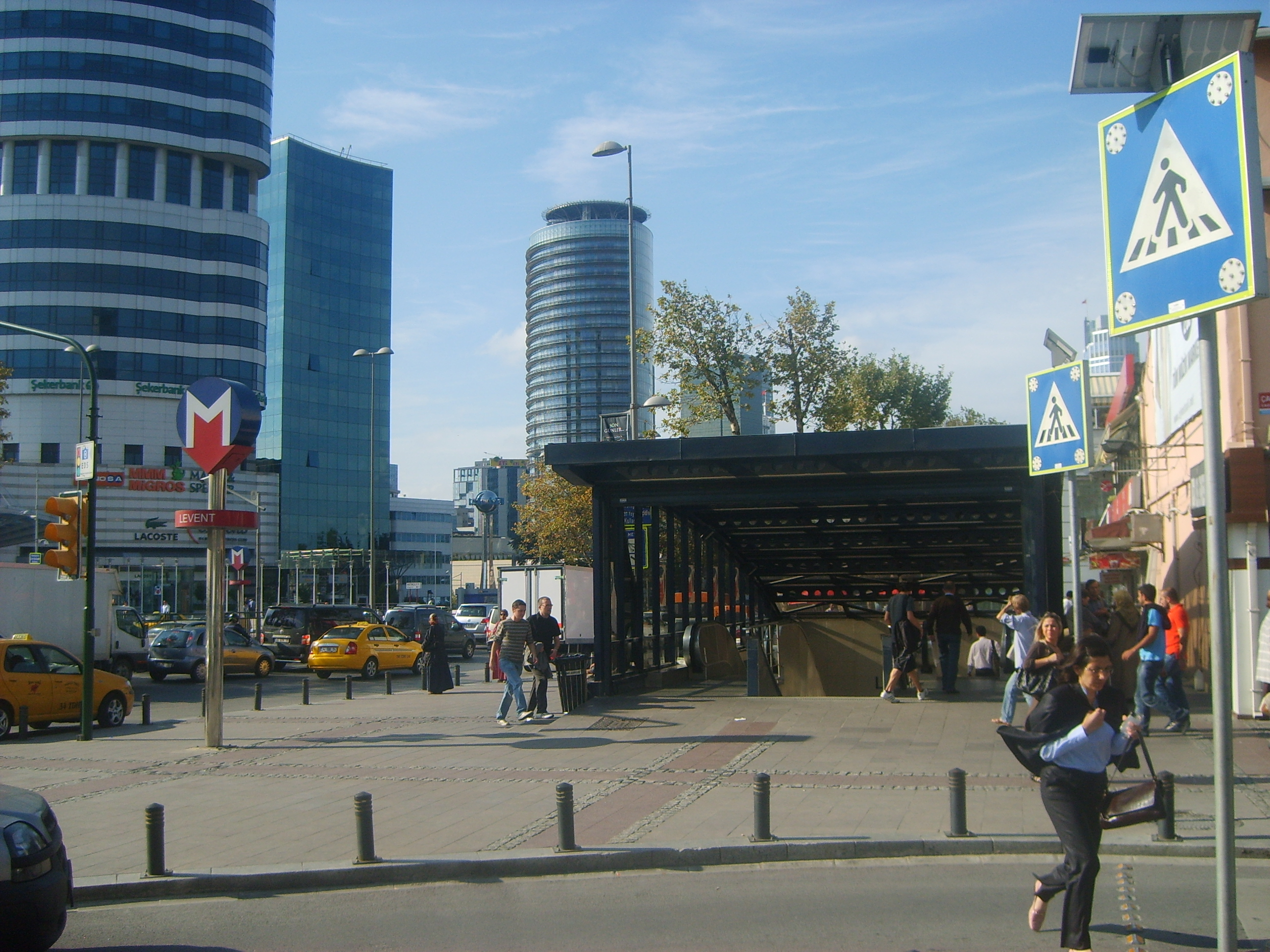
Levent station of the M2 and M6 line (old)

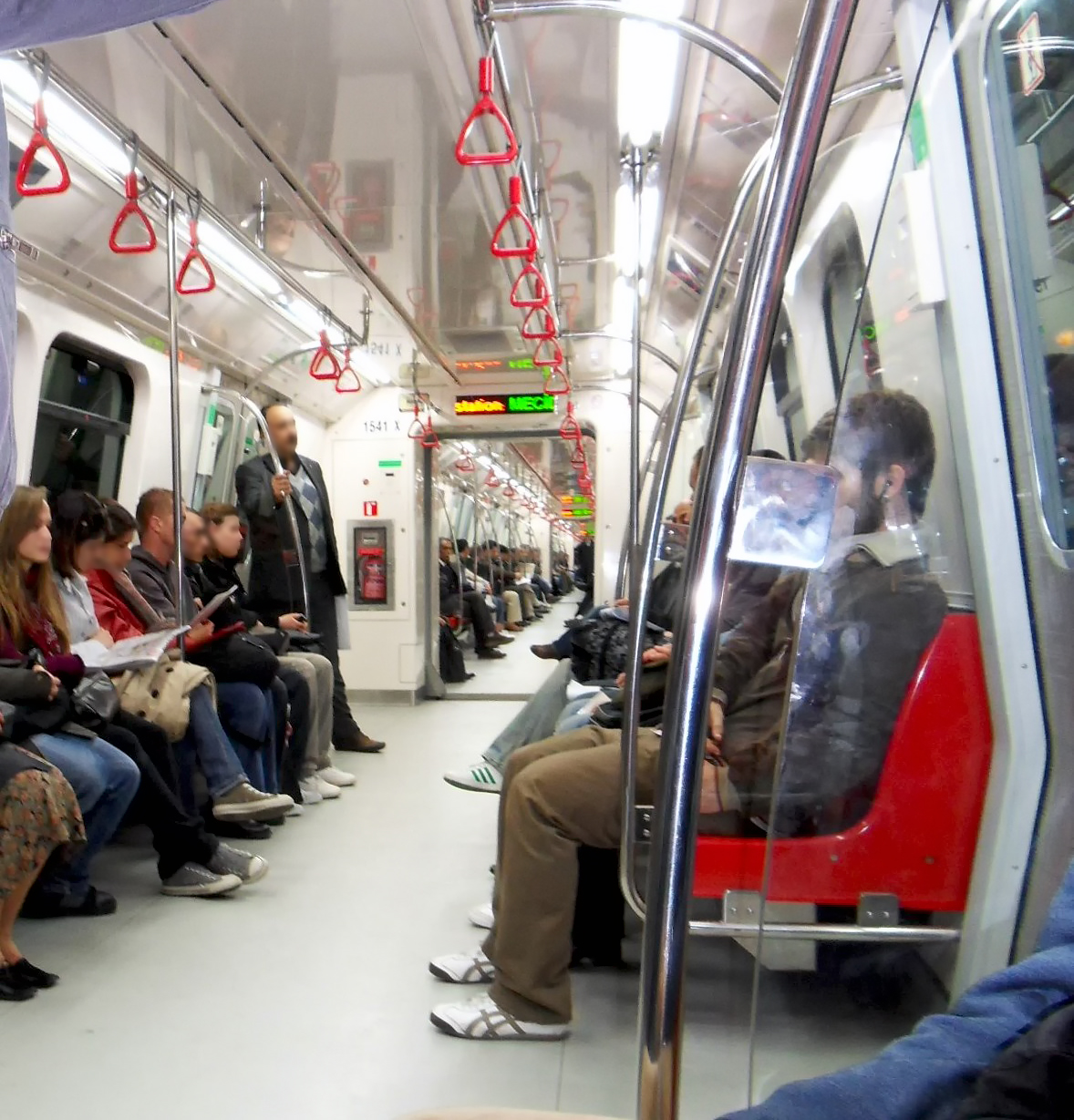
Interior of the trains

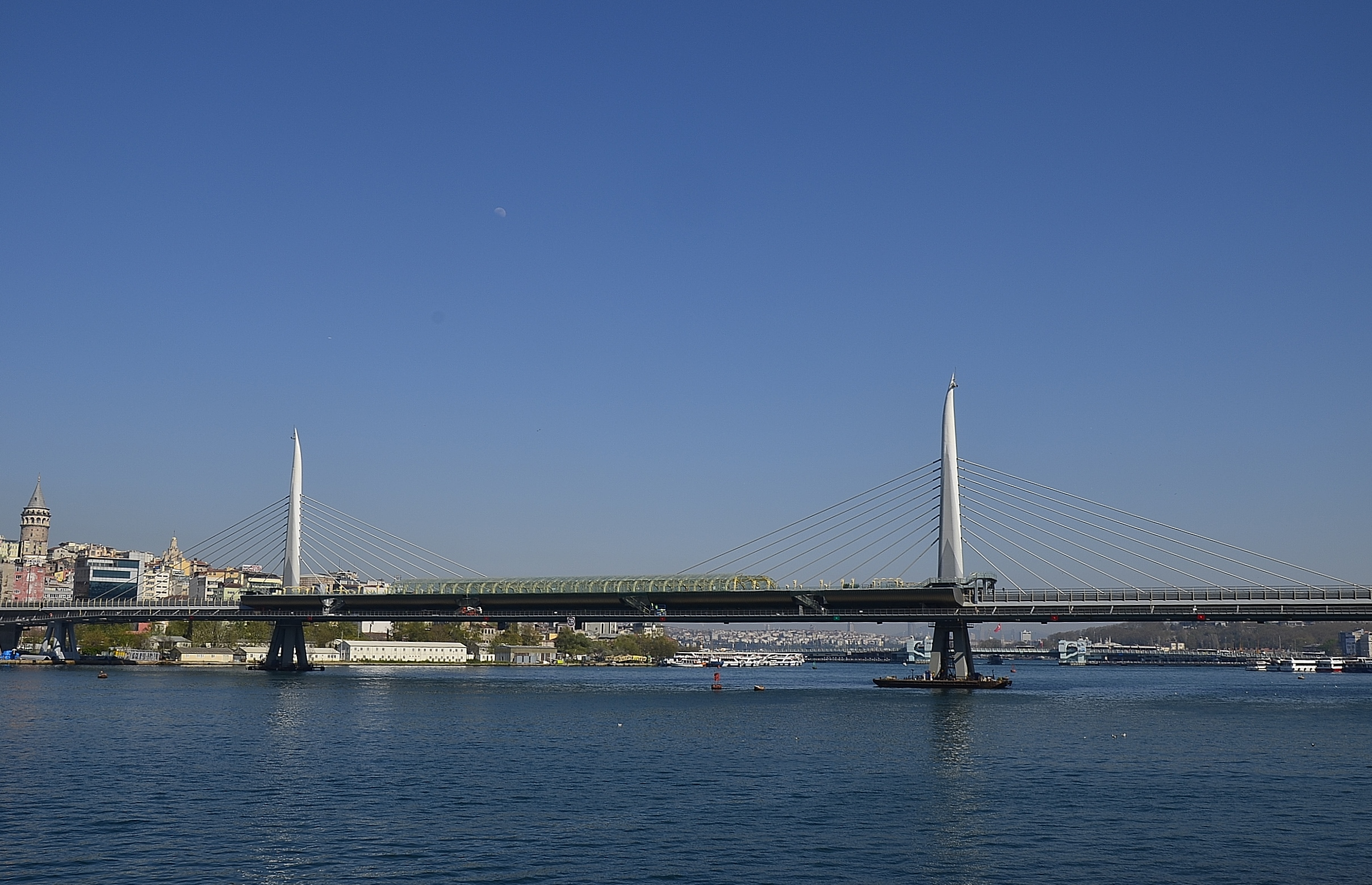
Golden Horn Metro Bridge

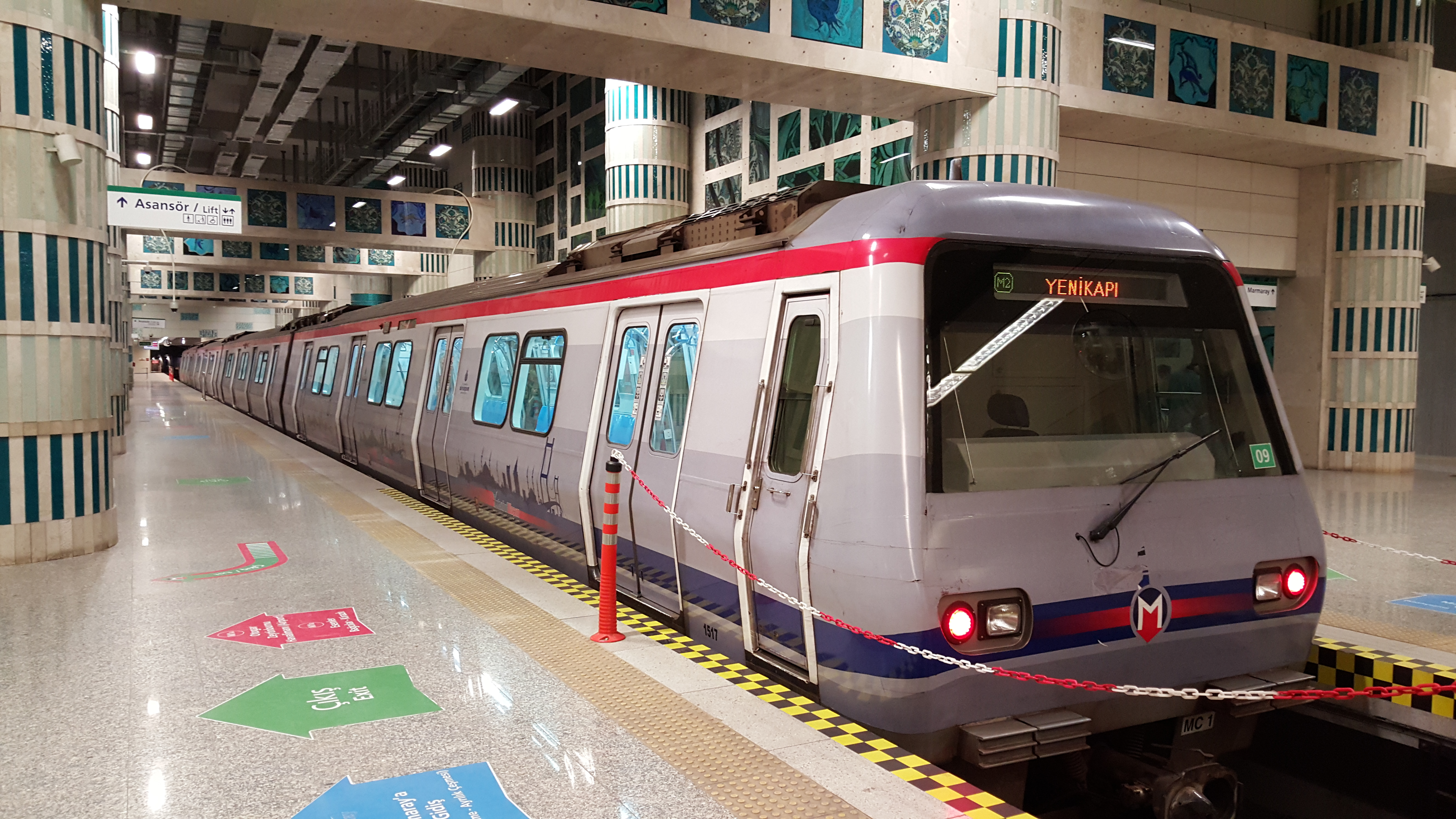
M2 train at Yenikapı station

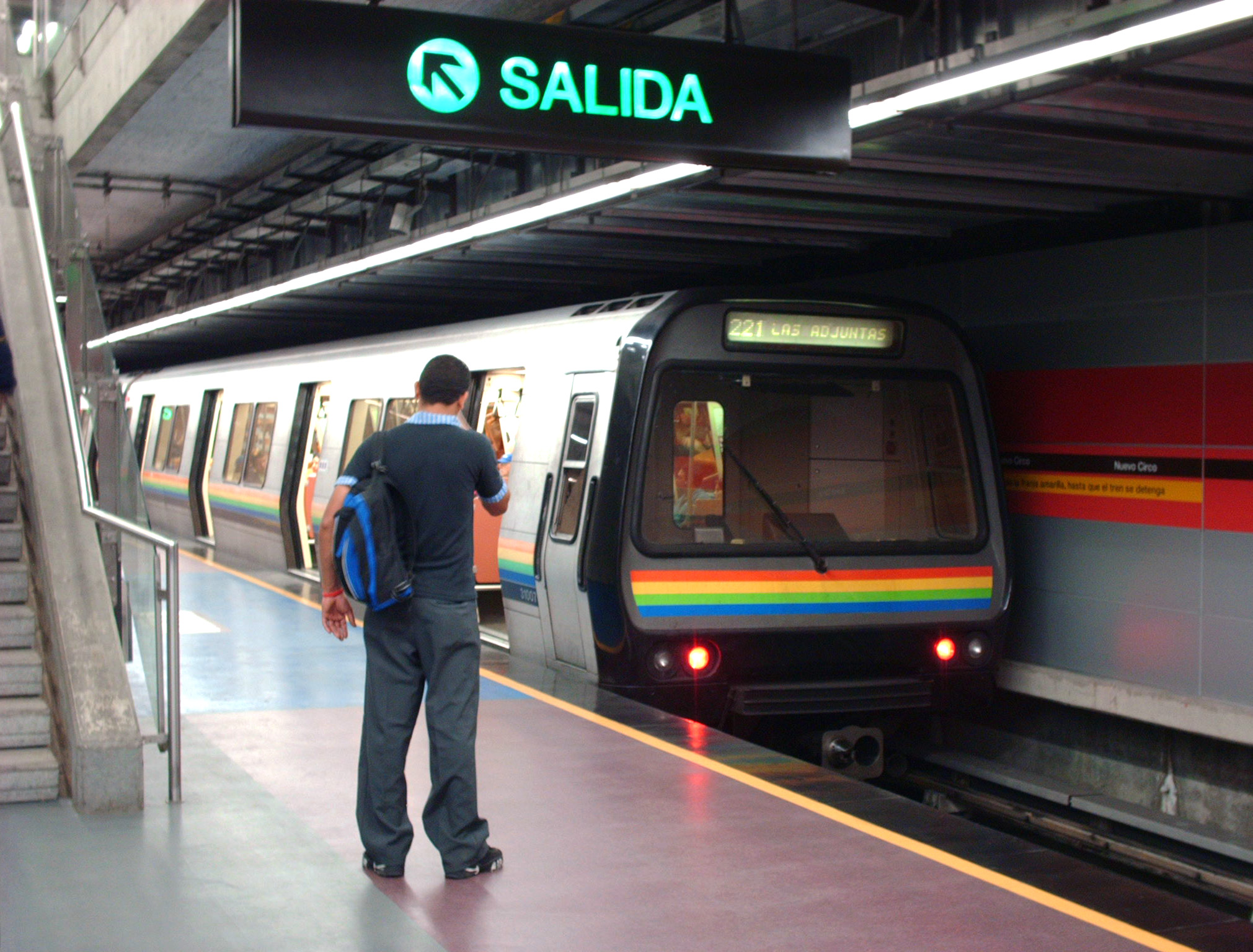
A Caracas Metro S3 train, from which the design of the trains used on Istanbul's M2 and M6 lines is derived

== See also ==
- Golden Horn Metro Bridge
- Istanbul modern tramways
- Istanbul nostalgic tramways
- Public transport in Istanbul
- İstanbul Metropolitan Municipality
- Metro İstanbul
