= Darüşşafaka station =

Station of the Istanbul Metro

Darüşşafaka
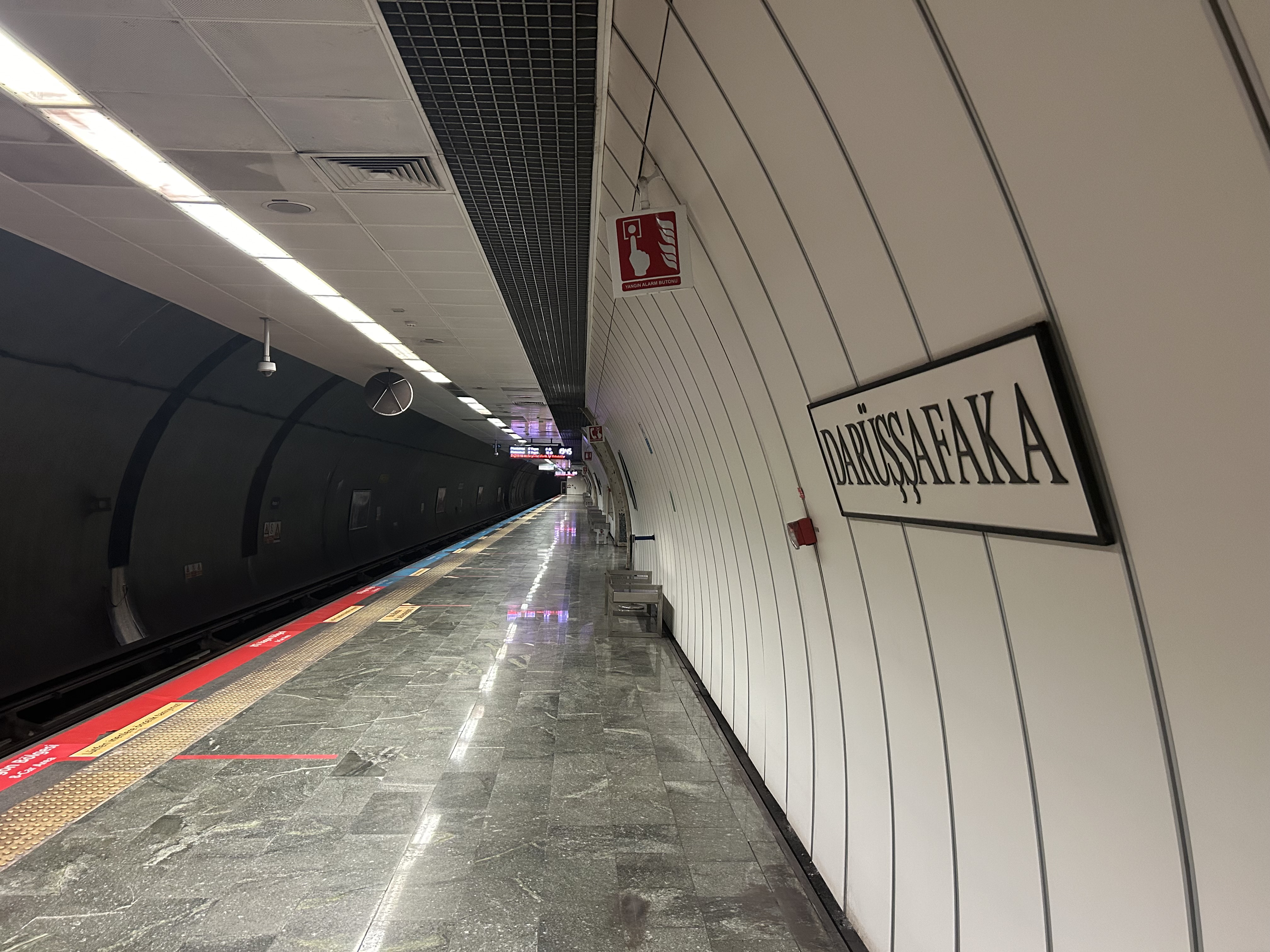

General information
- Location: Ulu Cd., Çamlıtepe Mah., 34457; Sarıyer, Istanbul
- Coordinates: 41.1302°N 29.0250°E
- Owner: Istanbul Metropolitan Municipality
- Operator: Metro Istanbul
- Line: M2
- Platforms: 1 island platform
- Tracks: 2
- Connections: İETT Bus: 25G, 29C, 29D, 29M2, 29T, 41, 42M, 50H, 59RK, 59RS, 62H, D2; Istanbul Minibus: Sarıyer-Beşiktaş, Zincirlikuyu-Bahçeköy

Construction
- Structure type: Underground
- Accessible: Yes

Other information
- Website: https://metro.istanbul

History
- Opened: 2 September 2010
- Electrified: 750V DC Third rail

Services
| Preceding station | Istanbul Metro | Following station |
|---|---|---|
| Atatürk Oto Sanayi towards Yenikapı | M2 Line | Hacıosman Terminus |
Location

Darüşşafaka is an underground rapid transit station on the M2 line of the Istanbul Metro. It is located under Büyükdere Avenue in southern Sarıyer. The station was opened on 2 September 2010 as a northern expansion of the M2 line. Until 29 October 2011 it served as the northern terminus until the line was further extended to Hacıosman. Darüşşafaka has an island platform serviced by two tracks.

== Layout ==
| Southbound | ← toward Yenikapı |
Island platform
| Northbound | toward Hacıosman → |
