= Atatürk Oto Sanayi station =

Station of the Istanbul Metro

Atatürk Oto Sanayi
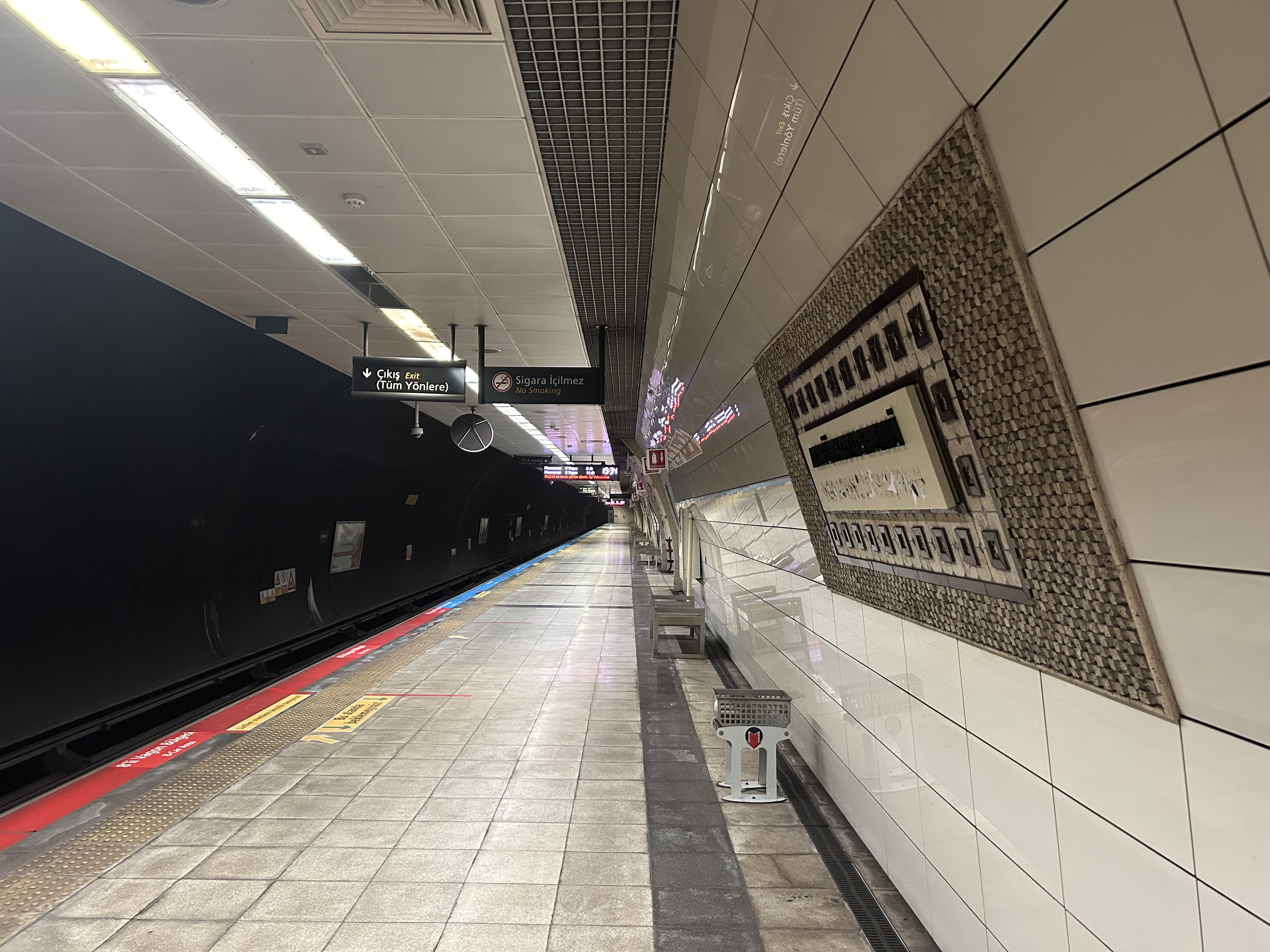

General information
- Location: Büyükdere Cd., Maslak Mah., 34398; Sarıyer, Istanbul
- Coordinates: 41.1186°N 29.0240°E
- Owner: Istanbul Metropolitan Municipality
- Operator: Metro Istanbul
- Line: M2
- Platforms: 1 island platform
- Tracks: 2
- Connections: İETT Bus: 25G, 29A, 29C, 29D, 29GM, 41, 42KM, 42M, 42Z, 50H, 59RK, 59RS; Istanbul Minibus: Beşiktaş-Sarıyer, Zincirlikuyu-Bahçeköy

Construction
- Structure type: Underground
- Accessible: Yes

History
- Opened: 31 January 2009
- Electrified: 750V DC Third rail

Services
| Preceding station | Istanbul Metro | Following station |
|---|---|---|
| İ.T.Ü.–Ayazağa towards Yenikapı | M2 Line | Darüşşafaka towards Hacıosman |
Location

Atatürk Oto Sanayi is an underground rapid transit station on the M2 line of the Istanbul Metro. It is located under Büyükdere Avenue just north of Maslak. The station opened on 31 January 2009 as part of the northern extension of the M2. It served as the northern terminus until 2 September 2010 when the line was extended further north to Darüşşafaka. Atatürk Oto Sanayi has an island platform serviced by two tracks.

== Layout ==
| Southbound | ← toward Yenikapı |
Island platform
| Northbound | toward Hacıosman → |
