= Maslak =

Business district in Istanbul, Turkey

- Neighbourhood
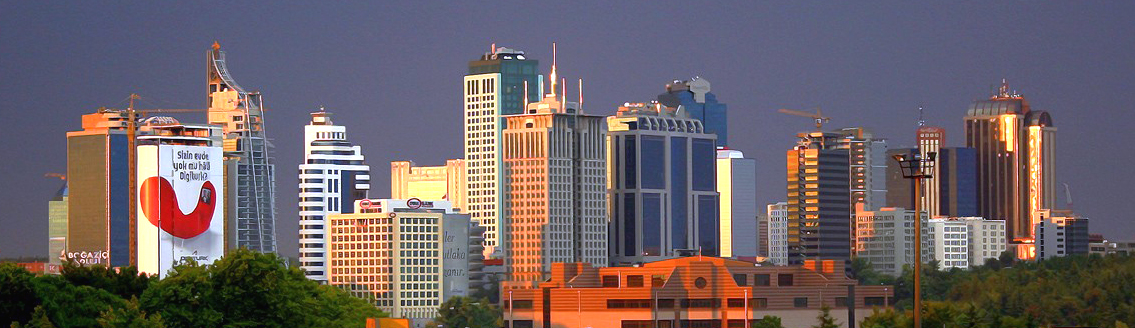
- Maslak in 2007

- Location within Turkey Location within Istanbul
- Coordinates: 41°06′32″N 29°01′16″E
- Country: Turkey
- Province: Istanbul
- District: Sarıyer
- Population (2022): 12,260
- Time zone: UTC+3 (TRT)

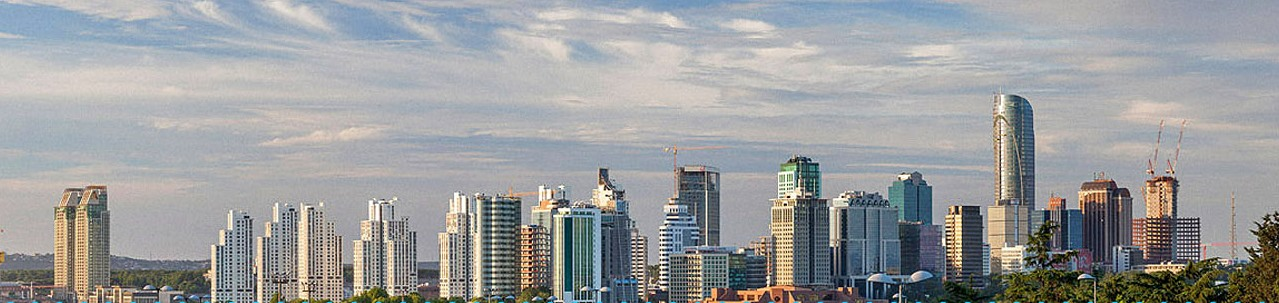
A panorama of Maslak business district in 2014

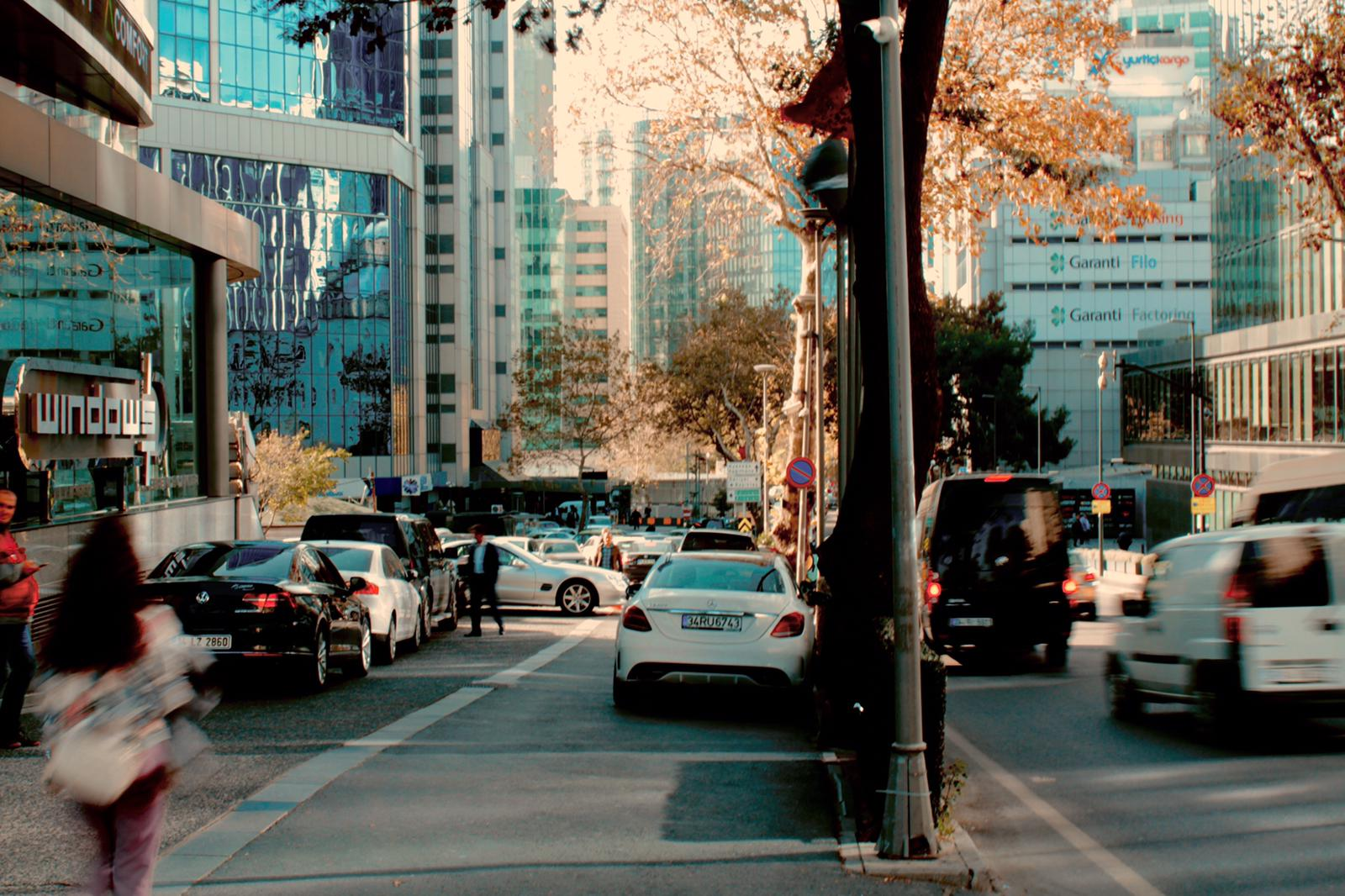
A street in Maslak business district

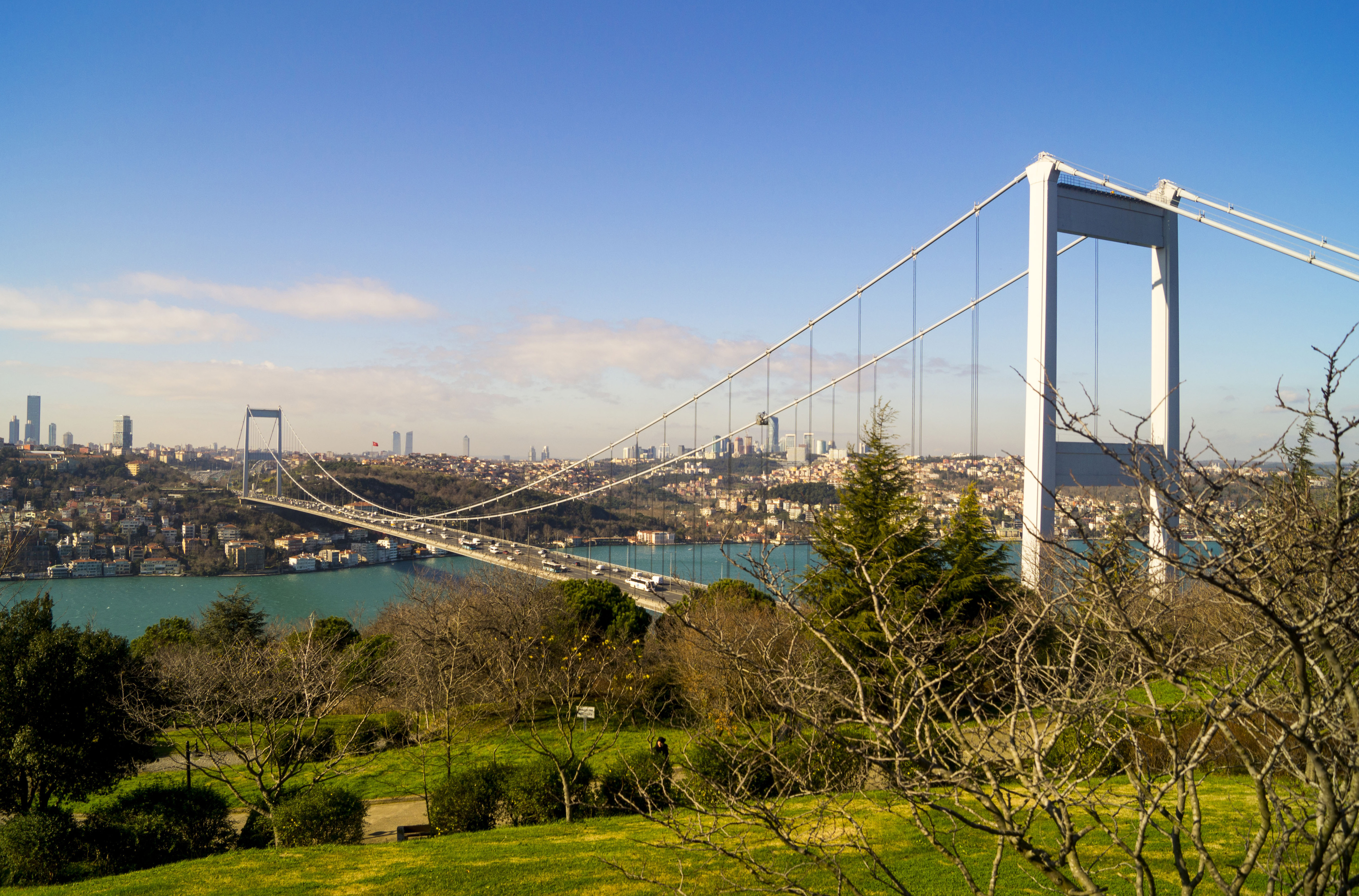
Fatih Sultan Mehmet Bridge and the skyscrapers of Levent (left) and Maslak (right) business districts

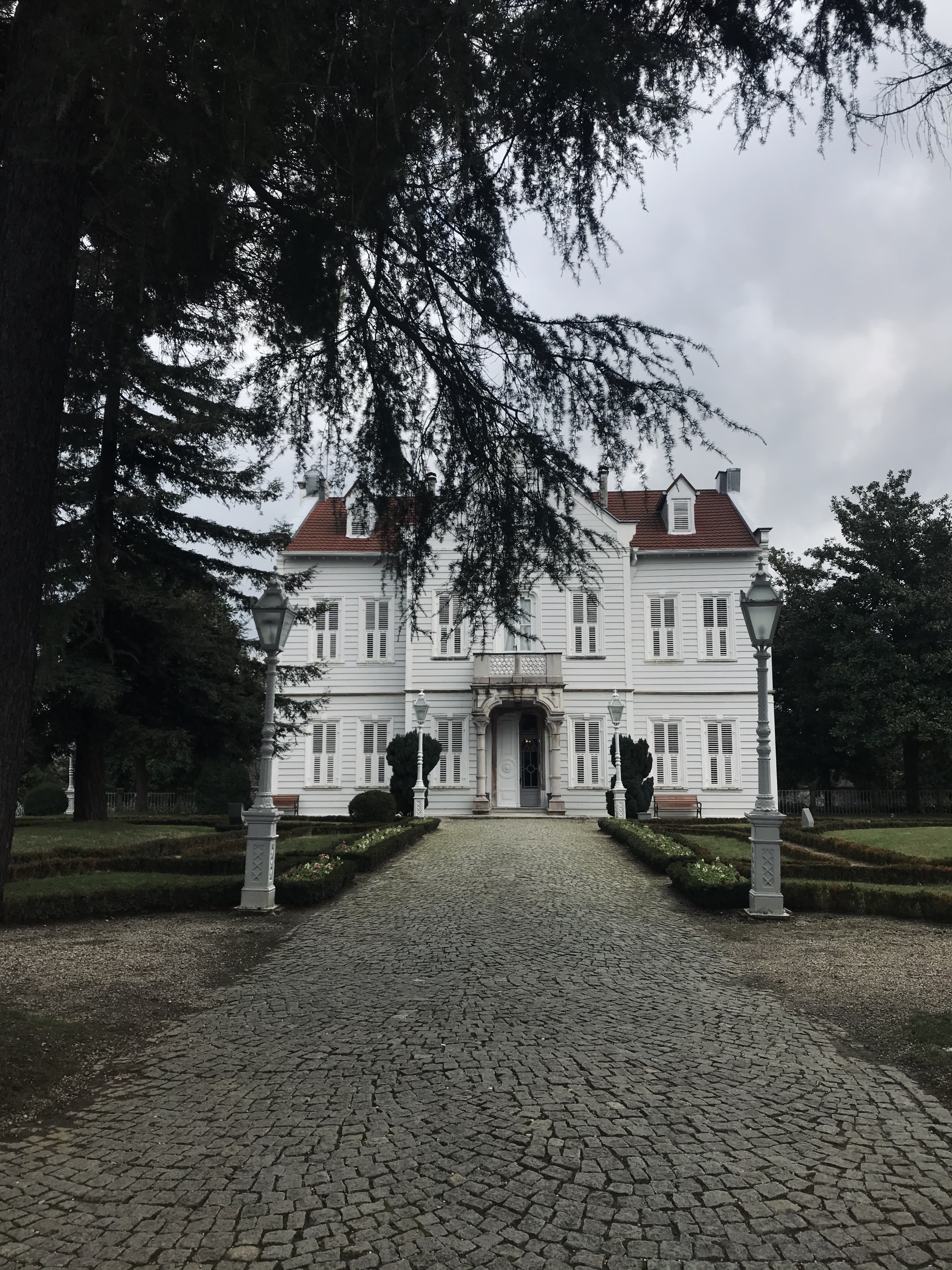
Maslak Kasrı

Maslak is a neighbourhood in Sarıyer, Istanbul Province, in Turkey. Its population is 12,260 (2022). It is one of the main business districts of Istanbul, located on the European side of the city. It was formerly an exclave of the municipality of Şişli, though being far north and actually closer to the municipalities of Sarıyer and Beşiktaş. In 2012, the jurisdiction of the Maslak district was shifted from Şişli to Sarıyer.

Maslak is in direct competition with the nearby Levent business district for new skyscraper projects. The tallest skyscraper in Maslak is the 47-floor Spine Tower, which reaches a height of 202 meters; and the tallest skyscraper currently under construction in the nation is the Diamond of Istanbul, which comprises three centrally-connected towers, the tallest of which will have 53 floors above ground and will reach a structural height of 270 meters.

The Diamond of Istanbul will be the first steel skyscraper in Turkey, despite the fact that constructing with steel costs more than constructing with concrete. The reason for choosing steel was its relative strength in resisting earthquakes since Istanbul is located on the North Anatolian Fault, though concrete is more fire-resistant.

The stations İTÜ-Ayazağa and Atatürk Oto Sanayi of the M2 line of the Istanbul Metro serve the Maslak business district and its surrounding neighborhoods.

== ITU Ayazağa Campus in Maslak ==
One of the five campuses of the Istanbul Technical University, the Ayazağa Campus, is located in Maslak.

== Image gallery ==
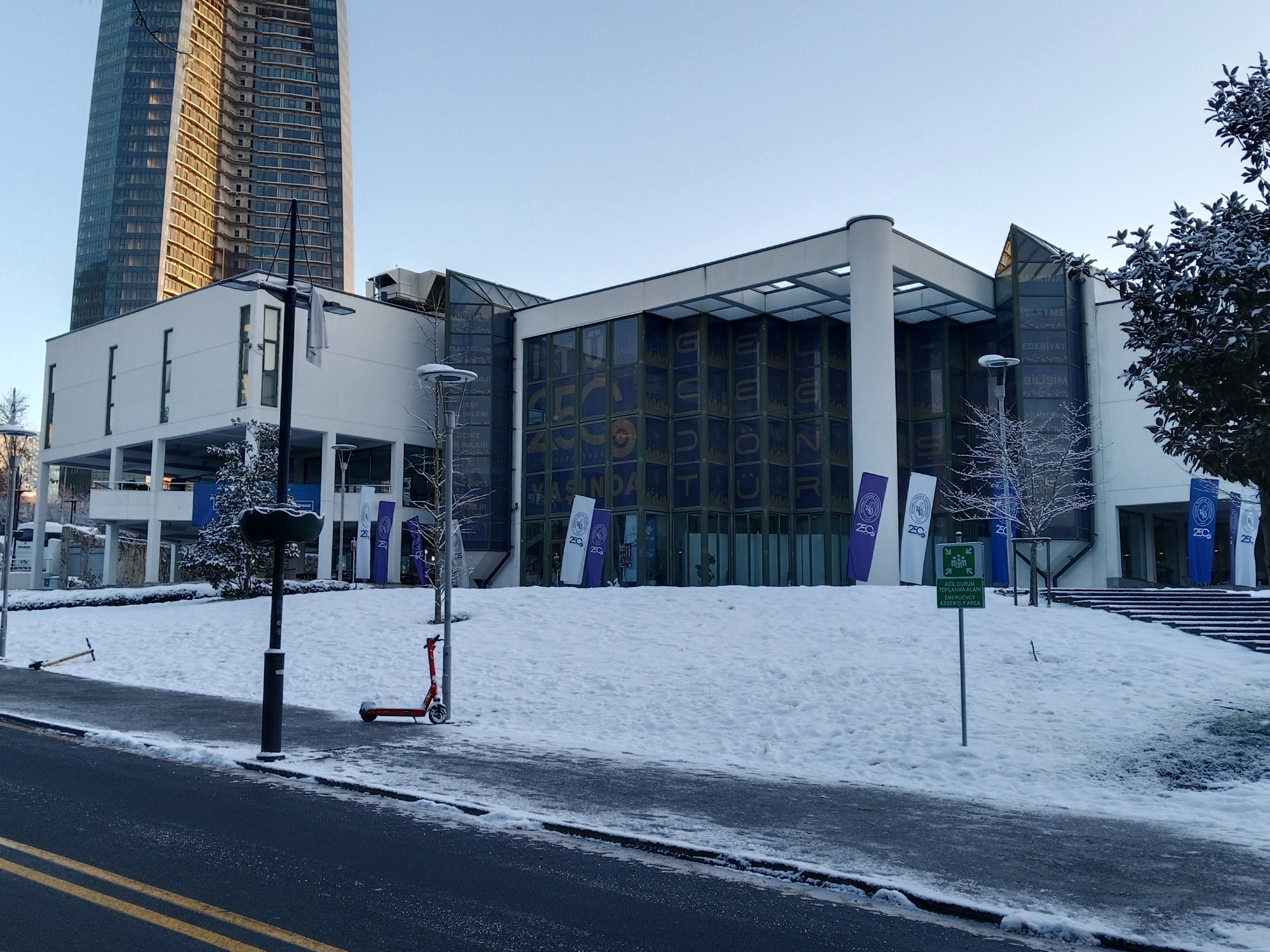
ITU Süleyman Demirel Cultural Center and the Rams Beyond Tower in Maslak, Istanbul

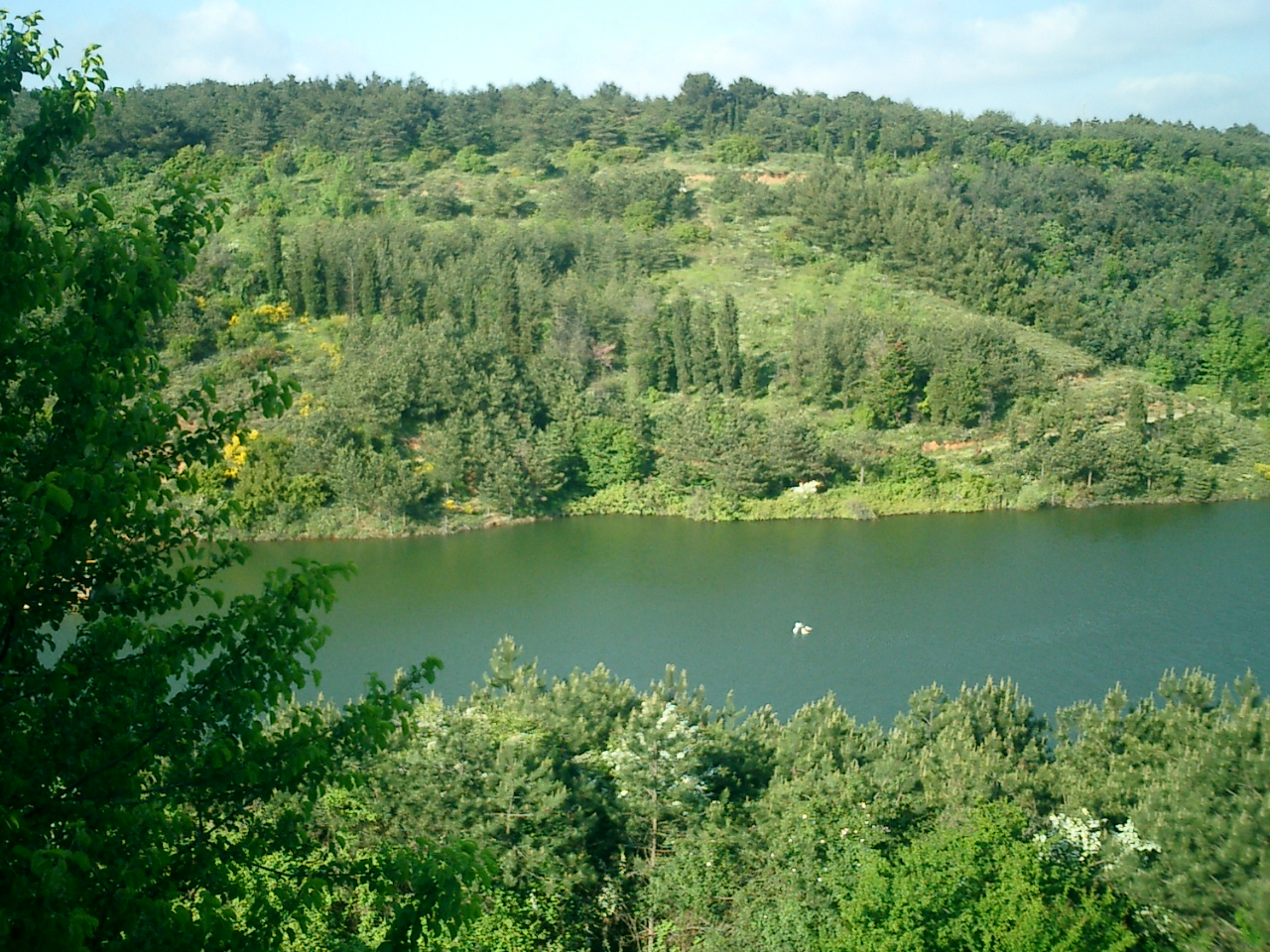
ITU Lake at the Ayazağa Campus in Maslak, Istanbul

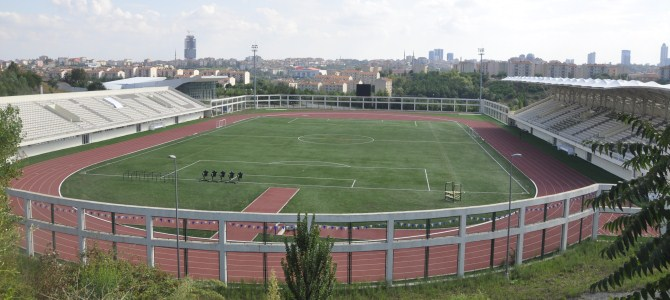
ITU Stadium at the Ayazağa Campus in Maslak, Istanbul

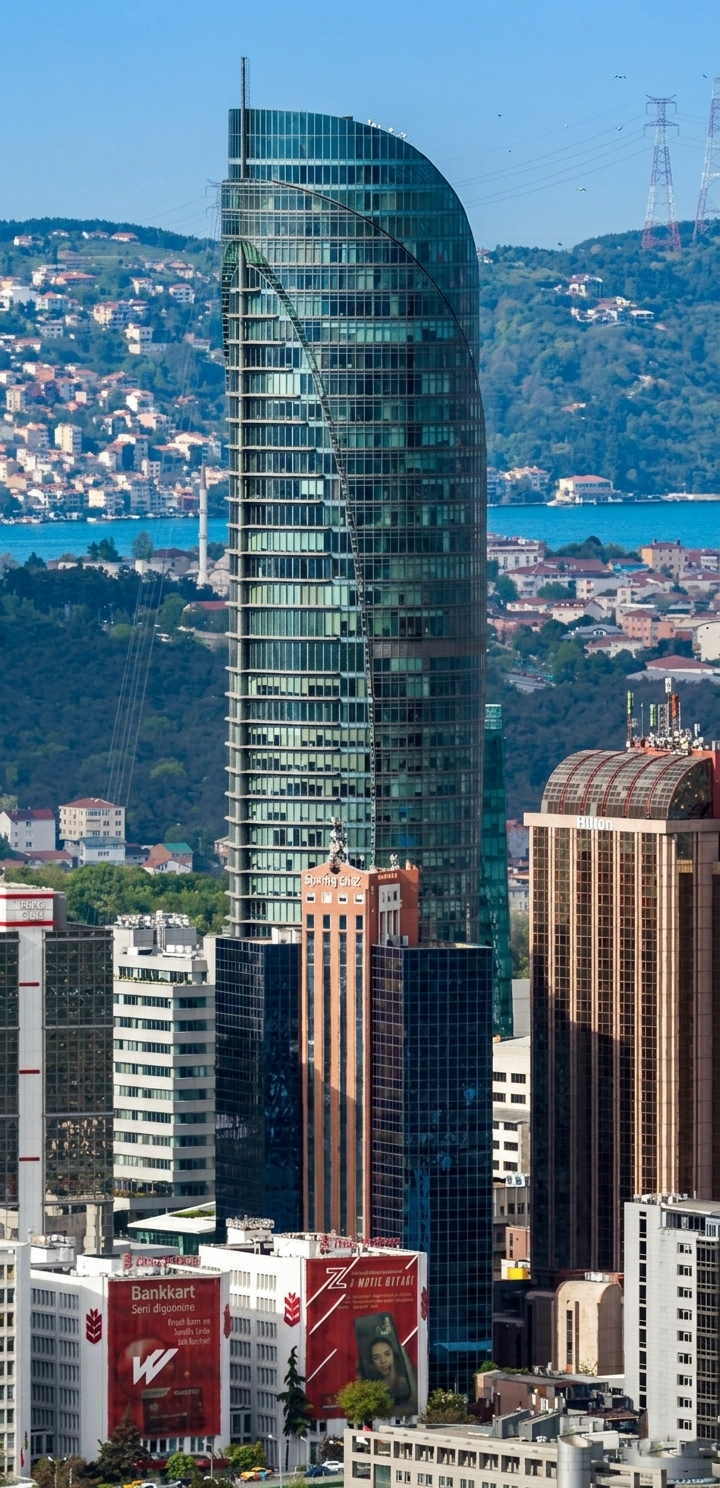
Spine Tower in Maslak, Istanbul

== See also ==
- Architecture of Turkey
- Bankalar Caddesi
- Istanbul International Finance Center
- Levent
- List of tallest buildings in Istanbul
- List of tallest buildings in Turkey
