= Hacıosman station =

Station of the Istanbul Metro

Hacıosman
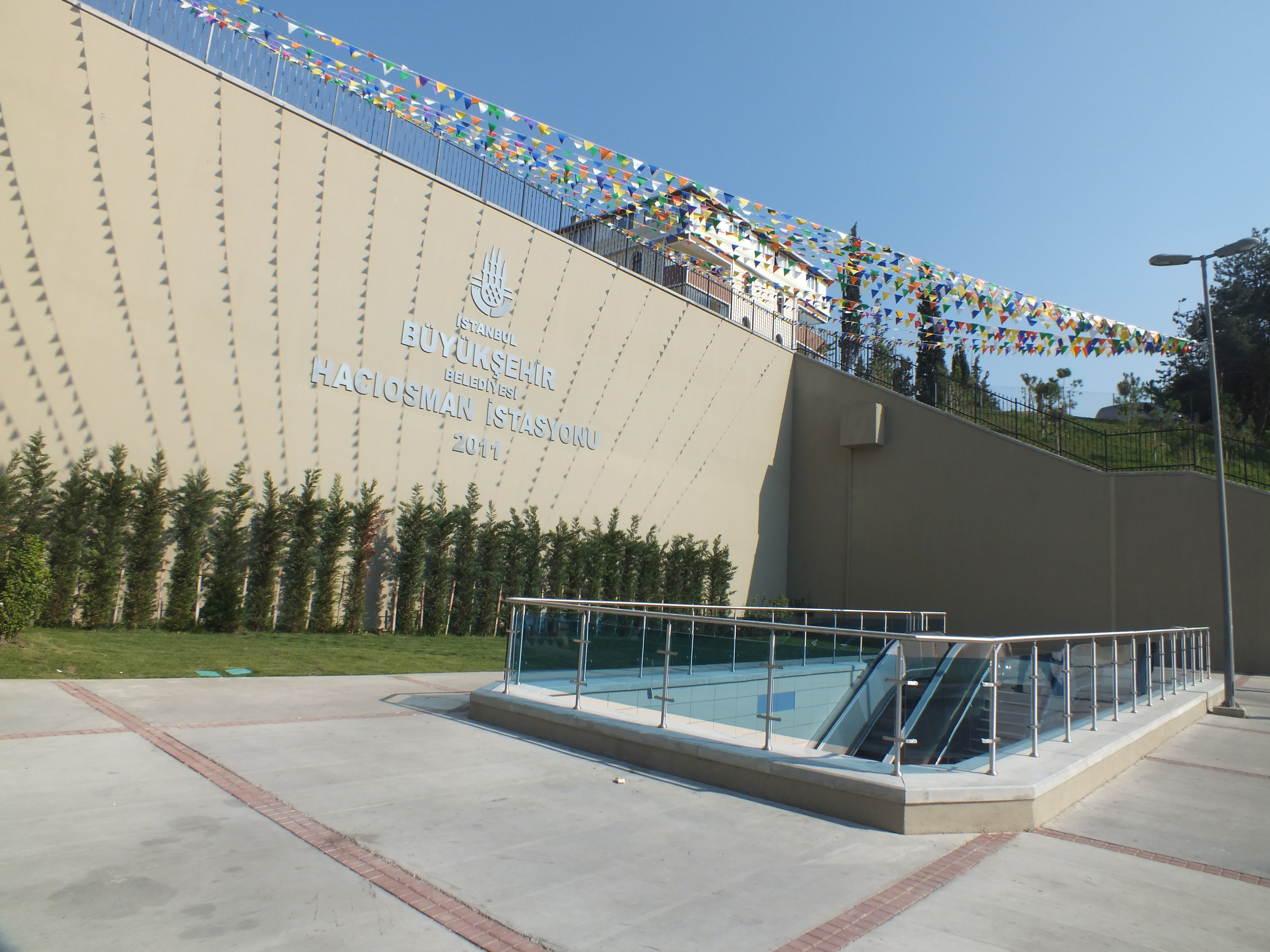

General information
- Location: Tarabya Bayırı Cd., Tarabya Mah., 34457; Sarıyer, Istanbul
- Coordinates: 41.1399°N 29.0309°E
- Owner: Istanbul Metropolitan Municipality
- Operator: Metro Istanbul
- Line: M2
- Platforms: 1 island platform
- Tracks: 2
- Connections: İETT Bus: 25, 25A, 25S1, 25Y, 29M1, 29M2, 42A, 42HM, 48D, 50H, 59HS, 59RH, 62H, 150, 151, 152, 154, H-8; Istanbul Minibus: Beşiktaş-Sarıyer, Zincirlikuyu-Bahçeköy

Construction
- Structure type: Underground
- Accessible: Yes

Other information
- Station code: M2/A

History
- Opened: 29 April 2011
- Electrified: 750V DC Third rail

Services
Preceding station	Istanbul Metro	Following station
Darüşşafaka towards Yenikapı	M2 Line	Terminus
Location

Hacıosman is an underground rapid transit station and northern terminus of the M2 line of the Istanbul Metro. It is located in southern Sarıyer under Tarabya Bayırı Avenue. Hacıosman was opened on 29 April 2011 as a northern extension of the M2 to service neighborhoods in Sarıyer. It has an island platform serviced by two tracks.

== Layout ==
Southbound	← toward Yenikapı
Island platform
Southbound	← toward Yenikapı
