= Taksim =

Taqsīm (Arabic: تَقْسِيم) or taksim (Turkish, Persian and Urdu) means "division", "partition", or "distribution". It may refer to:

- Taqsim, a style of musical improvisation in traditional Middle Eastern music
- Taksim (Istanbul Metro), an underground rapid transit complex under Taksim Square, Istanbul, Turkey
- Taksim (politics), the Turkish Cypriot political belief in the partition of Cyprus in the Cyprus dispute
- Taksim Square, a square in Beyoğlu district of Istanbul, Turkey
- Taksim Stadium, a football stadium in Istanbul that was converted from Taksim Military Barracks in 1921

== See also ==
- Taksin, (1734–1782), King of Thonburi (in present-day Thailand)
