= Kabataş station =

Underground metro station in Istanbul, Türkiye

Kabataş (M7) Kabataş (F1)
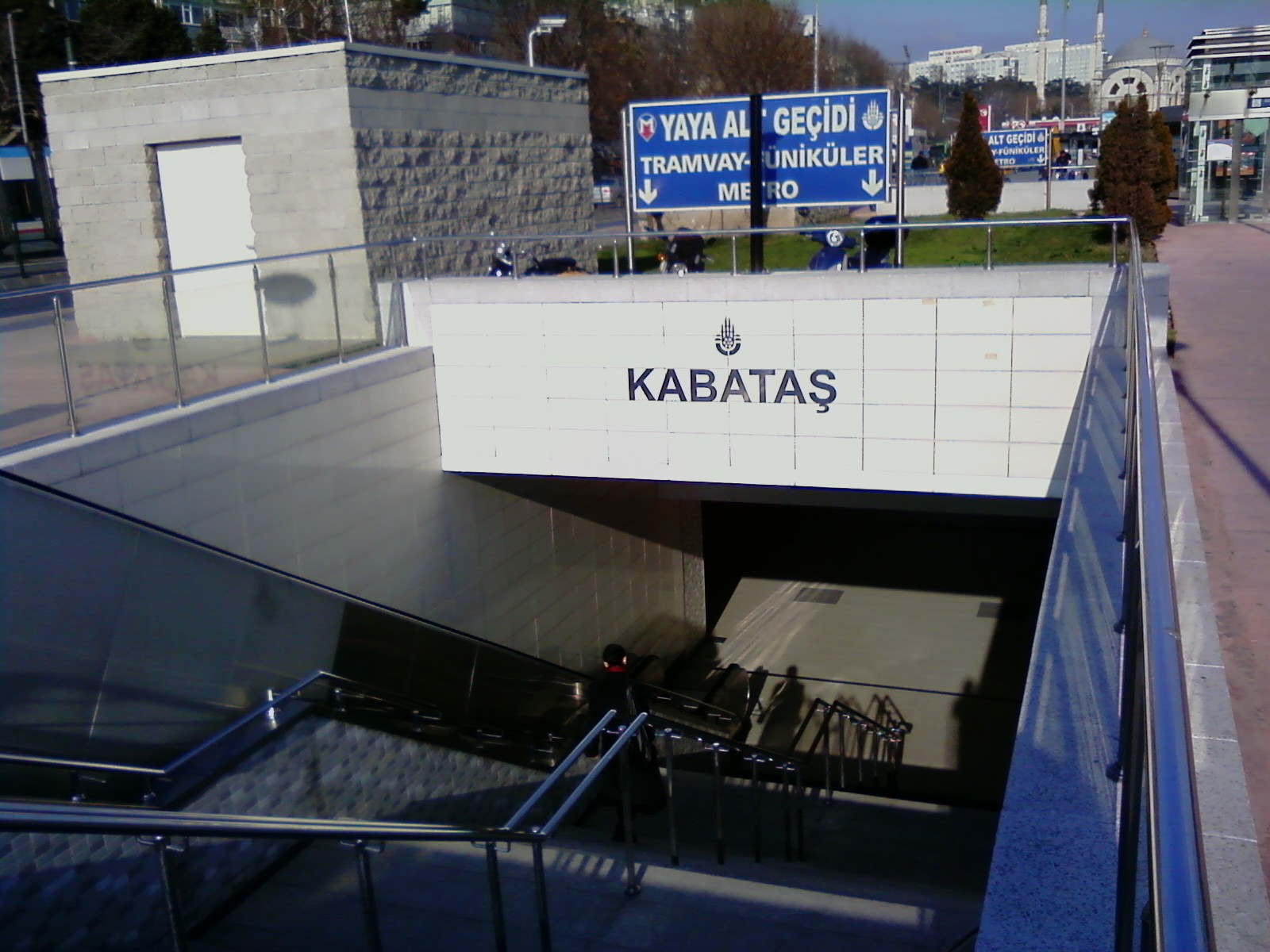

General information
- Location: Meclis-i Mebusan Cd., Ömer Avni Mah., 34427; Beyoğlu, Istanbul
- Coordinates: 41.0347°N 28.9930°E
- Owner: Istanbul Metropolitan Municipality
- Operator: Metro Istanbul
- Lines: F1; M7 (Under Construction)
- Platforms: 1 bay platform
- Tracks: 1
- Connections: Istanbul Tram: T1 at Kabataş; Şehir Hatları and Dentur at Kabataş Terminal; İETT Bus: 22, 25E, 26, 26A, 26B, 27E, 27SE, 28, 28T, 29C, 29D, 30D, 41E, 43R, 58A, 58N, 58S, 58UL, 62, 63, 70KE

Construction
- Structure type: Underground
- Accessible: Yes

History
- Opened: 29 June 2006

Services
Preceding station	Istanbul Metro	Following station
Taksim Terminus	F1	Terminus
Future service
Beşiktaş towards Mahmutbey	M7 Line	Terminus
Location

Kabataş is an underground station and eastern terminus of the F1 funicular line and will be the eastern terminus of the M7 metro line of the Istanbul Metro . The station is located under Meclis-i Mebusan Avenue in northeastern Beyoğlu. Connections to the T1 tram line, ferry service and city bus service are available on the surface.

Kabataş station was opened on 29 June 2006, 28 days after the T1 tram line was extended north from Eminönü to Kabataş. The station has become an important transfer point between ferry and rapid transit.

== Layout ==
Westbound	← toward Beşiktaş
Island platform(Under construction)
Westbound	← toward Beşiktaş (Terminus)

== See also ==
- Hadika Stone, erected in 1850
