= Vezneciler =

Vezneciler may refer to:

- Vezneciler neighborhood, part of Fatih district in the European part of Istanbul
- Vezneciler (Istanbul Metro), an Istanbul metro station
- Vezneciler Campus, Istanbul University's main campus adjacent to Beyazıt Square
