= T1 (Istanbul Tram) =

Tram line in Istanbul

T1 Kabataş–Bağcılar

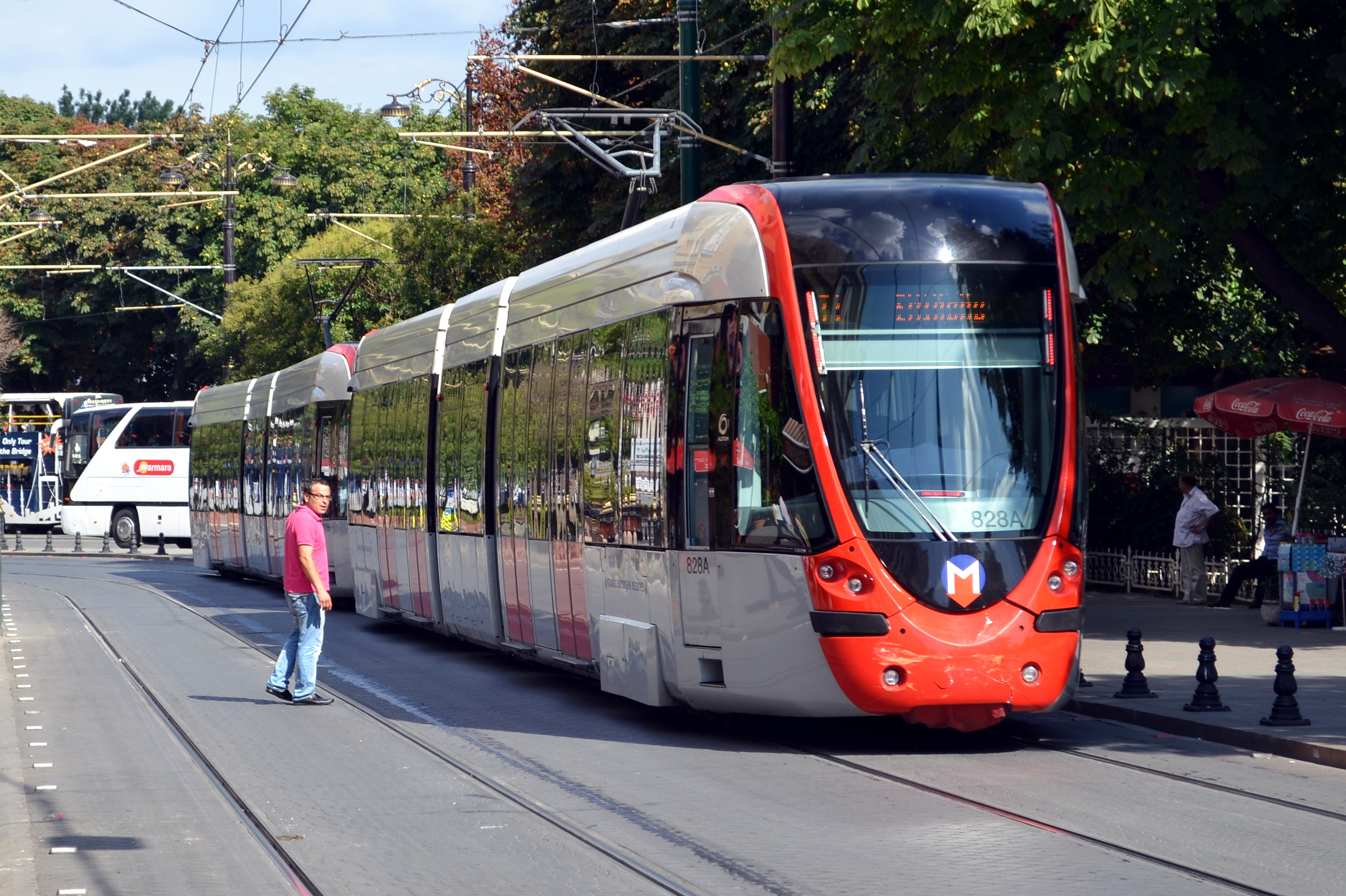

Overview
- Locale: Istanbul, Turkey
- Stations: 31
- Website: T1

Service
- Type: Tram
- System: Istanbul Tram
- Operator: Metro Istanbul
- Rolling stock: 55 Bombardier Flexity Swift A32; 37 Alstom Citadis X04
- Daily ridership: 320,000

History
- Opened: 13 June 1992

Technical
- Line length: 19.3 km (12.0 mi)
- Track gauge: 1,435 mm (4 ft 8 1/2 in) standard gauge
- Electrification: Overhead line

The T1, officially referred to as the T1 Kabataş–Bağcılar tram line (Turkish: T1 Kabataş–Bağcılar tramvay hattı) is a tram line of the Istanbul Tram, operated by Metro Istanbul. It runs from Kabataş to Bağcılar via Eminönü, with a total length of 19.3 km (12.0 mi).

== History ==
The first section of the T1 opened between Aksaray and Beyazıt on 13 June 1992 and was later extended first to Topkapı and Zeytinburnu, and later to Eminönü. On 29 June 2006, the Eminönü–Kabataş extension was opened, making the transfer to Kabataş–Taksim funicular possible. On 3 February 2011, the T1 merged with the T2 which opened in 2006 between Zeytinburnu and Bağcılar, with the T2's stations being converted to low-floor.

== Rolling stock ==
At the time of opening in 1992, the T1 used high-floor trams manufactured by ABB. These have subsequently been replaced by two types of low-floor tram, which are currently in use on the line. Both types are air conditioned and usually run in coupled pairs.

=== Bombardier Flexity Swift A32 ===
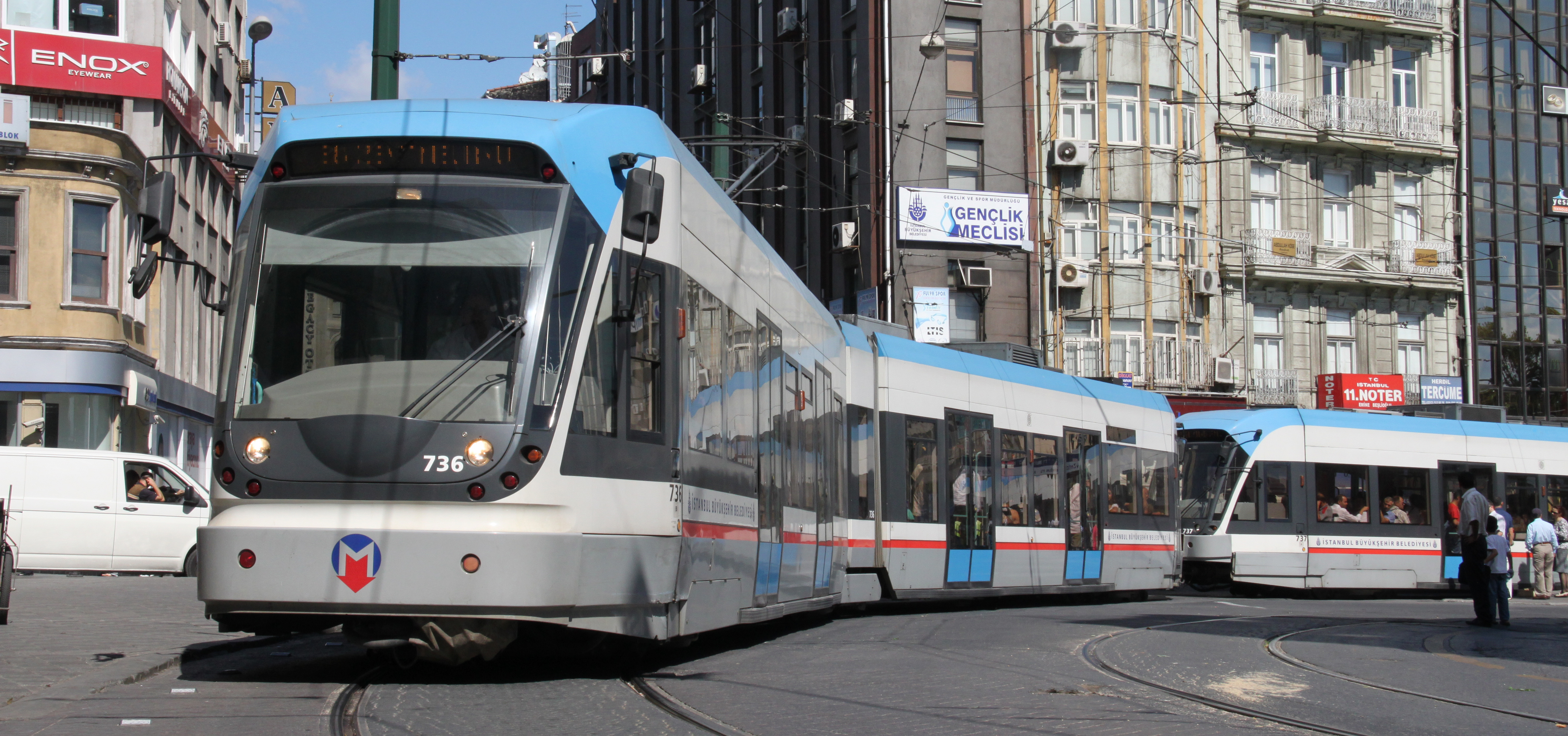
Bombardier Flexity Swift A32

In 2001, the Istanbul Transport Authority placed an order for 55 Bombardier Flexity Swift A32 trams. They entered service in 2003, once the platforms on the line had been lowered to accommodate low-floor trams. They have a top speed of 70 km/h, a total of 64 seats + 10 tip-up seats, and a maximum capacity of 272 passengers.

=== Alstom Citadis X04 ===
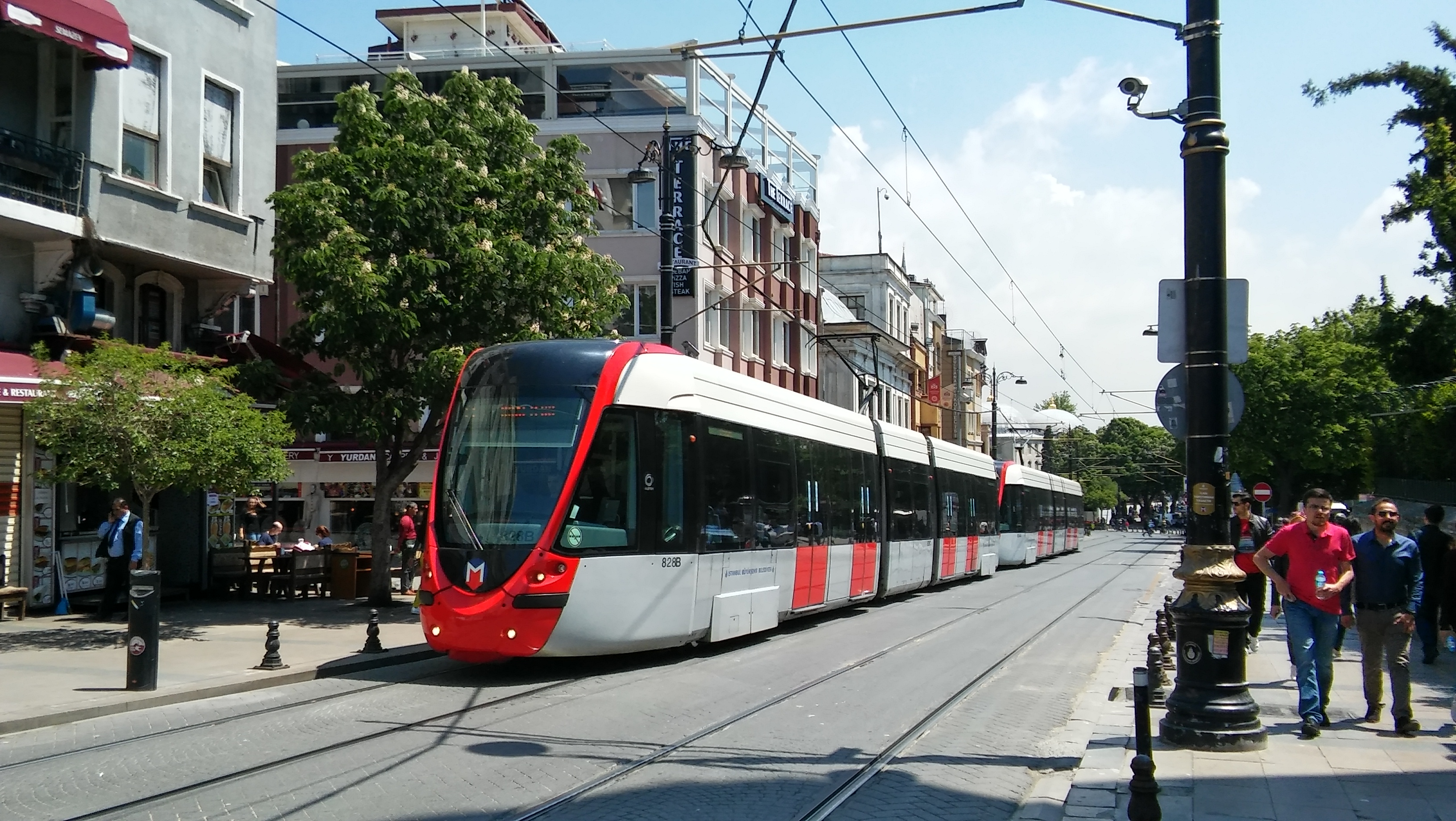
Alstom Citadis X04

In 2007, 37 Alstom Citadis X04 trams were ordered to replace the high-floor trams running on the T2 Zeytinburnu-Bağcılar line, in anticipation of the merger of the T1 and T2 lines and the conversion of the former T2 line platforms to low-floor height. The first tram was delivered in September 2009, and following testing the trams entered service in 2011. They also have a top speed of 70 km/h, and a maximum capacity of up to 500 passengers as a coupled pair.

== Stations ==
No	Station	Type	Transfer	District	Notes
1	Kabataş	Level	・ (under construction) ・ (Kabataş Terminal); İETT Bus: 22, 22B, 25E, 26, 26A, 26B, 27E, 27SE, 28, 28T, 29C, 29D, 30D, 41E, 43R, 58A, 58N, 58S, 58UL, 62, 63, 70KE	Beyoğlu	Park and Ride facility
2	Fındıklı	Level	İETT Bus: 22, 25E, 26, 26A, 26B, 27E, 27SE, 28, 28T, 29C, 29D, 30D, 41E, 43R, 58A, 58N, 58S, 58UL, 62, 63, 70KE	Beyoğlu	
3	Tophane	Level	İETT Bus: 26, 26A, 26B, 28, 28T, 30D, 70KE	Beyoğlu	
4	Karaköy	Level	İETT Bus: 26, 26A, 26B, 28, 28T, 30D, 31E, 32, 33, 33B, 33ES, 33TE, 33Y, 35, 36KE, 38E, 46Ç, 50E, 50P, 54E, 54TE, 66, 70D, 70FE, 70KE, 74, 74A, 77Ç, 78, 78H, 79E, 82, 90, 91O, 92, 92A, 92C, 93, 94, 97A, 97GE, 99A, 146B, 336E, EM1, EM2	Beyoğlu	
5	Eminönü	Level	İETT Bus: 26, 26A, 28, 28T, 30D, 31E, 32, 33, 33B, 33ES, 33TE, 33Y, 35, 36KE, 38E, 46Ç, 50E, 50P, 54E, 54TE, 66, 70D, 70FE, 70KE, 74, 74A, 77Ç, 78, 78H, 79E, 79GE, 82, 90, 92, 92C, 93, 97A, 97GE, 99A, 146B, 336, 336E, BN1, EM1, EM2	Fatih	
6	Sirkeci	Level	・ (Sirkeci railway station); İETT Bus: BN1	Fatih	
7	Gülhane	Level		Fatih	
8	Sultanahmet	Level		Fatih	
9	Çemberlitaş	Level		Fatih	
10	Beyazıt–Kapalıçarşı	Level	İETT Bus: 32A, 35A, 35C, 36, 36ES, 38, 38Z, 90B, 91E, 92B, 92K, 94A, 97, 97B, 97G	Fatih	
11	Laleli–İstanbul Üniversitesi	Level	(Vezneciler–Istanbul University station); İETT Bus: 32A, 35A, 35C, 36, 36ES, 38, 38Z, 90B, 91E, 92B, 92K, 94A, 97, 97B, 97G	Fatih	300m walk between lines
12	Aksaray	Level	・・・ (Yenikapı transfer center)	Fatih	750m walk between lines
13	Yusufpaşa	Level	(Aksaray Metro Station); İETT Bus: 28T, 31, 32A, 33, 33B, 33E, 33Y, 35, 35A, 35C, 35D, 36, 36ES, 36Y, 46T, 71T, 72T, 73, 73F, 76D, 79E, 79Ş, 80, 80T, 82, 85T, 89, 89B, 89C, 89K, 92, 92B, 92C, 92K, 92T, 93, 93T, 97, 97A, 97BT, 97T, 145T, 336Y, E-56	Fatih	200m walk between lines
14	Haseki	Level	İETT Bus: 28T, 31, 32A, 33, 33B, 33E, 33Y, 35D, 36, 36ES, 36Y, 46T, 71T, 72T, 73, 73F, 76D, 79E, 79Ş, 82, 85T, 89, 89B, 89C, 89K, 92, 92B, 92C, 92K, 92T, 93, 93T, 97, 97A, 97BT, 97T, 145T, 336Y, E-56	Fatih	
15	Fındıkzade	Level	İETT Bus: 28T, 31, 32A, 33, 33B, 33E, 33Y, 35D, 36, 36ES, 36Y, 46T, 71T, 72T, 73, 73F, 76D, 79E, 79Ş, 82, 85T, 89, 89B, 89C, 89K, 92, 92B, 92C, 92K, 92T, 93, 93T, 97, 97A, 97BT, 97T, 145T, 336Y, E-56	Fatih	
16	Çapa-Şehremini	Level	İETT Bus: 28T, 31, 32A, 33, 33B, 33E, 33Y, 35D, 36, 36ES, 36Y, 46T, 71T, 72T, 73, 73F, 76D, 79E, 79Ş, 82, 85T, 89, 89B, 89C, 89K, 92, 92B, 92C, 92K, 92T, 93, 93T, 97, 97A, 97BT, 97T, 145T, 336Y, E-56	Fatih	
17	Pazartekke	Level	İETT Bus: 28, 31, 32A, 33, 33B, 33E, 33Y, 35D, 36, 36ES, 36Y, 41ST, 71T, 72T, 73, 73F, 76D, 79E, 79Ş, 82, 85T, 87, 88, 89, 89B, 89C, 89K, 92, 92B, 92C, 92K, 92T, 93, 93T, 97, 97A, 97BT, 97T, 145T, 336Y, E-56 MR11	Fatih	
18	Topkapı	Under the bridge	・ İETT Bus: 31, 31E, 33B, 41AT, 50B, 71T, 72T, 73, 73F, 76D, 79Ş, 82, 85C, 85T, 89, 89B, 89K, 92, 92T, 97, 97A, 97B, 97BT, 97T, 500L, MR11	Zeytinburnu	
19	Cevizlibağ-A.Ö.Y.	Level	İETT Bus: 31, 31E, 33B, 41AT, 71T, 72T, 73, 73F, 76D, 79Ş, 82, 85C, 85T, 89, 89B, 89K, 92, 92T, 97, 97A, 97B, 97BT, 97T, 500L, H-9, MR11	Zeytinburnu	
20	Merkez Efendi	Level		Zeytinburnu	
21	Akşemsettin	Level		Zeytinburnu	
22	Mithatpaşa	Level		Zeytinburnu	
23	Zeytinburnu	Level	・ İETT Bus: 31, 31E, 50B, 71T, 72T, 73, 73F, 76D, 78ZB, 79G, 79Ş, 82, 89A, 89B, 89K, 89M, 92, 93, 93M, 93T, 97, 97A, 97B, 97BT, 97KZ, 97T, H-9, MK97, MR10	Bakırköy	Park and Ride facility
24	Mehmet Akif	Level		Güngören	
25	Merter Tekstil Sitesi	Level		Güngören	
26	Güngören	Level	İETT Bus: 92C, 92T, 98G	Güngören	
27	Akıncılar	Level	İETT Bus: 92C, 92T, 98G	Güngören	
28	Soğanlı	Level	İETT Bus: 92C, 92T, 98G	Güngören	
29	Yavuz Selim	Level	İETT Bus: 92C, 92T, 98G	Güngören	
30	Güneştepe	Level	İETT Bus: 92T	Bağcılar	
31	Bağcılar	Level	(Bağcılar Meydan Metro Station); İETT Bus: 36CY, 92B, HT1	Bağcılar	300m walk between lines

== Planned extensions ==
In 2022 a special service for cruise passengers was announced which would run for cruise passengers from a new infill stop in Galataport (south of Kabataş station) and run to the Beyazıt station, providing visitors easy access to the Grand Bazaar at that stop as well as the rest of Sultanahmet, Istanbul's Old City.

Metro line M7 is being extended southeastward to Beşiktaş and Kabataş, which will provide T1 passengers much easier access to Şişli and other parts of the Istanbul Central Business District.

== See also ==
- Istanbul Tram
- Istanbul Metro
- Public transport in Istanbul
