= Şişhane station =

Station of the Istanbul Metro

Şişhane
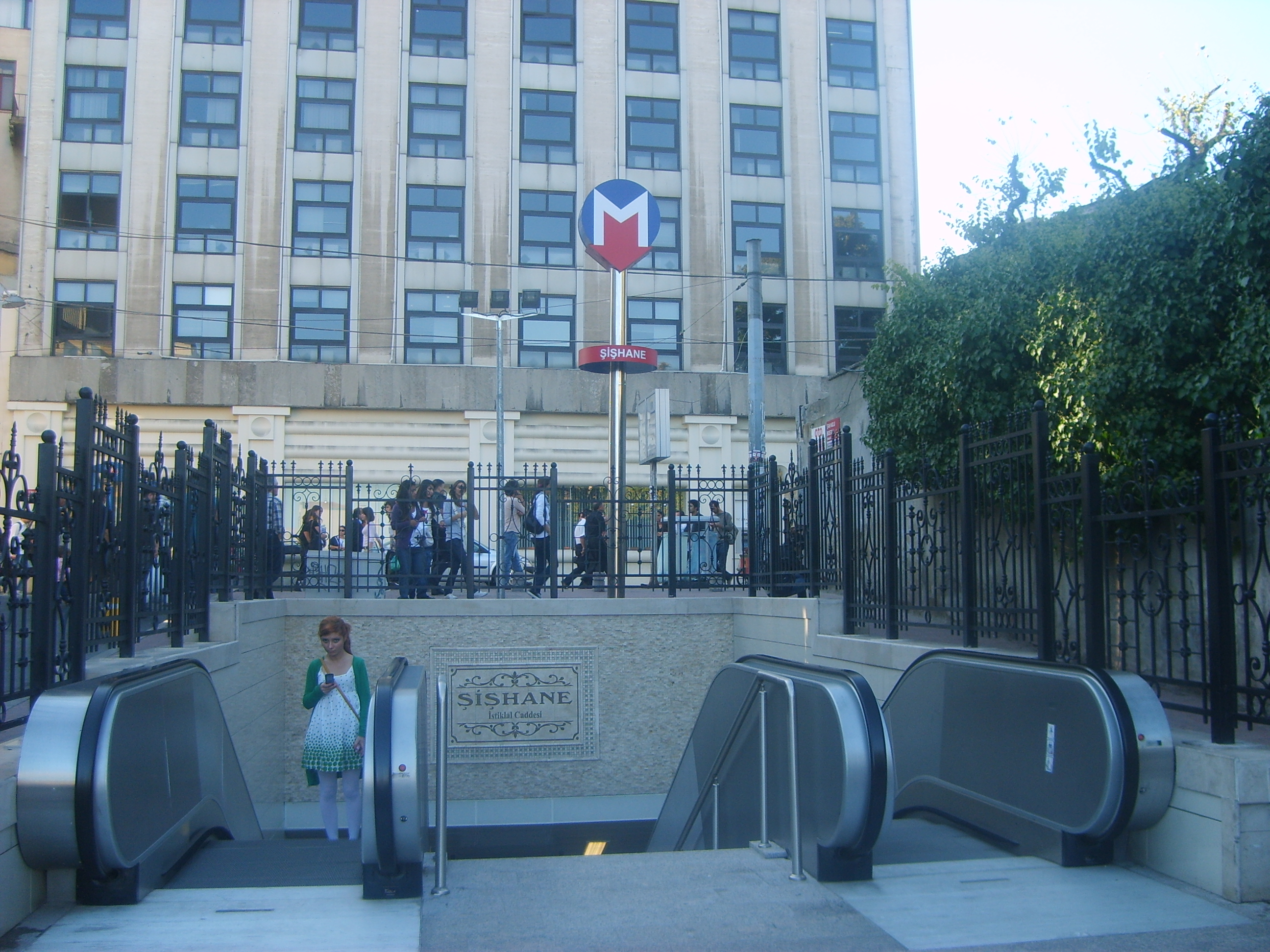
- Station entrance on İstiklâl Caddesi.

General information
- Location: Meşrutiyet Cd., Evliya Çelebi Mah., 34421; Beyoğlu, Istanbul
- Coordinates: 41.0278°N 28.9726°E
- System: Istanbul Metro rapid transit station
- Owner: Istanbul Metropolitan Municipality
- Line: M2
- Platforms: 1 island platform
- Tracks: 2
- Connections: Tünel at Beyoğlu; Taksim-Tünel Heritage tram İETT Bus: 32T, 35C, 46Ç, 46E, 46H, 46T, 50E, 50G, 50N, 54E, 54HT, 54TE, 55G, 55T, 66, 69A, 70FE, 70FY, 70KY, 71AT, 71T, 72T, 72YT, 73, 73F, 74, 74A, 76D, 77, 77A, 77Ç, 79T, 80T, 83O, 85T, 87, 89C, 89T, 92T, 93T, 97BT, 97T, 145T, E-56, E-59, EM1, EM2; Istanbul Minibus: Şişhane-Şişli, Şişhane-Yunus Emre Mahallesi, Şişhane - İsfanbul AVM, Şişhane - İmar Blokları; Istanbul Dolmuş: Taksim-Aksaray, Taksim-Bakırköy, Taksim-Cevizlibağ, Taksim-Florya, Taksim-Kocamustafapaşa, Taksim-Topkapı, Taksim-Yenibosna, Taksim-Yeşilköy

Construction
- Structure type: Underground
- Accessible: Yes

History
- Opened: 31 January 2009
- Electrified: 750V DC Third rail

Services
| Preceding station | Istanbul Metro | Following station |
|---|---|---|
| Haliç towards Yenikapı | M2 Line | Taksim towards Hacıosman |
Location

Şişhane is an underground station on the M2 line of the Istanbul Metro. The station is located under Meşrutiyet Street in Beyoğlu, Istanbul. Şişhane has an entrance to Istanbul's famous İstiklâl Caddesi as well as entrances to Kasımpaşa. An out-of-station interchange is available with the historic Tünel funicular line as well as the T2 tram line. Many city buses that run along Tarlabaşı Boulevard are just a few blocks away from Şişhane's Kasımpaşa portal. Şişhane was opened on 31 January 2009 along with Atatürk Oto Sanayi on the northern part of the line. Between 2009-14 trains from Şişhane would operate as a shuttle to Taksim and back. When the M2 was extended south to Yenikapı in 2014, trains operated normally traversing the full line.

== Layout ==
| Track 2 | ← toward Yenikapı |
Island platform
| Track 1 | toward Hacıosman → |

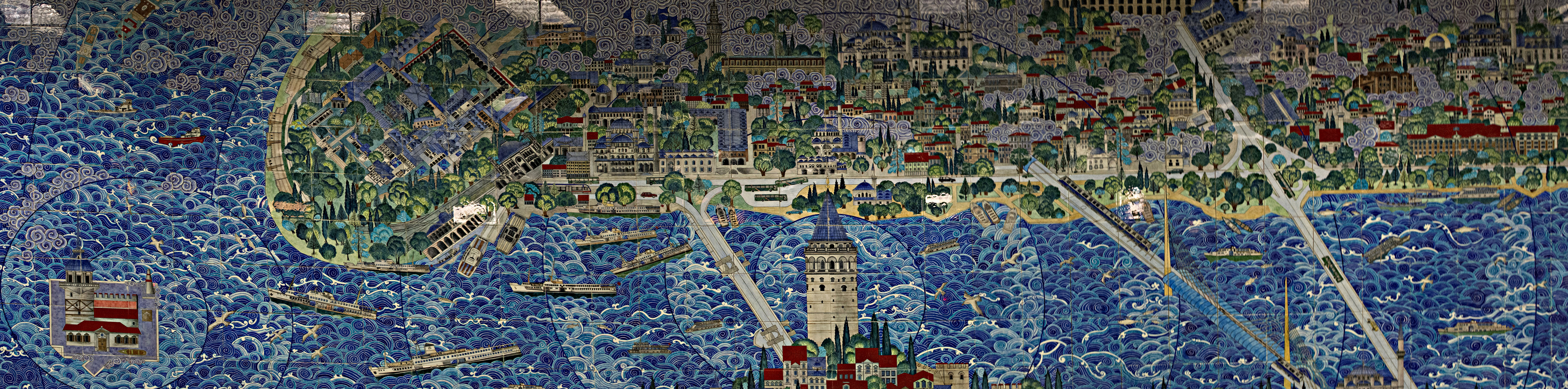
Sişhane metro station Tiles panorama

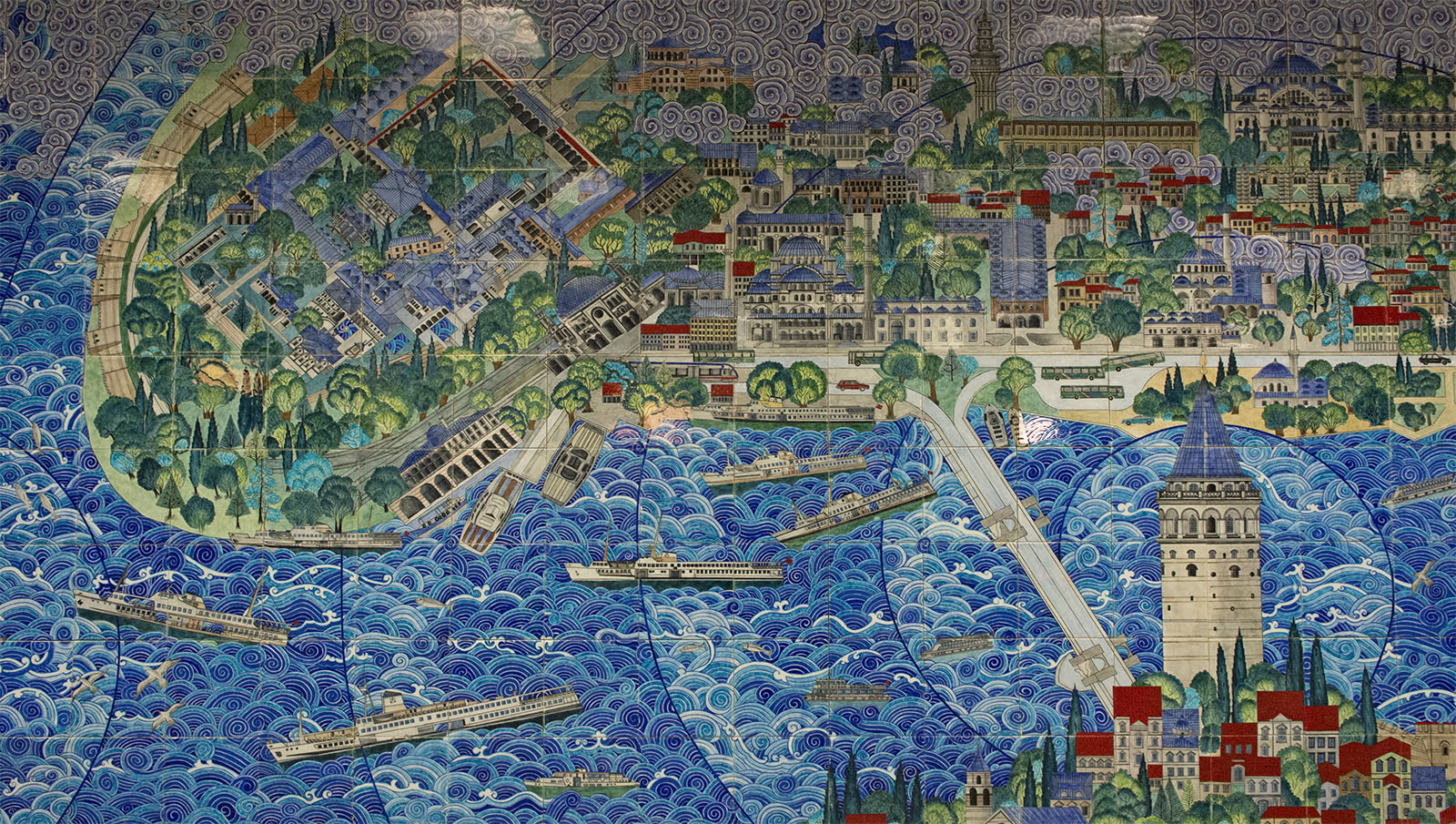
Sişhane metro station tiles

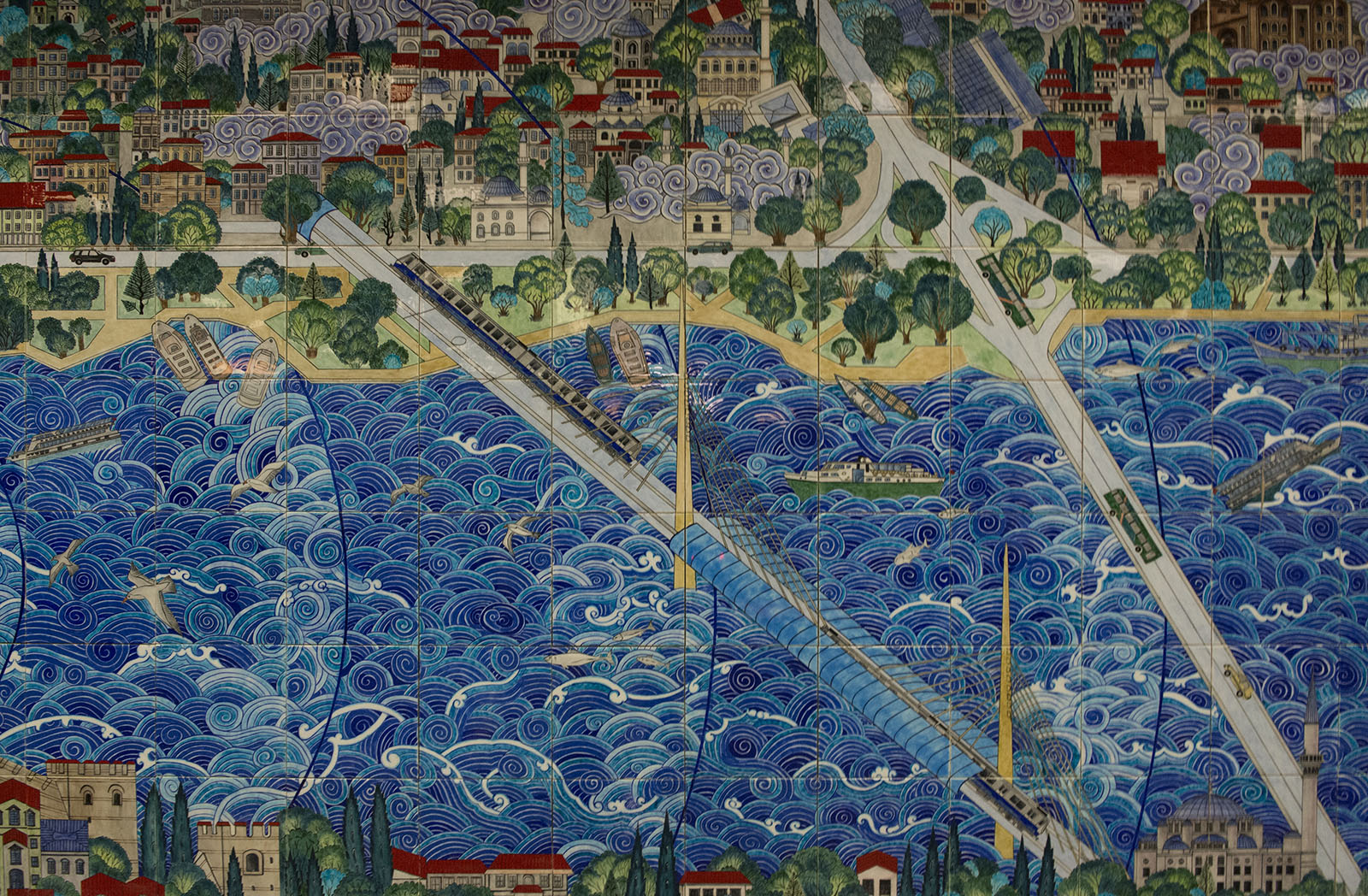
Sişhane metro station tiles

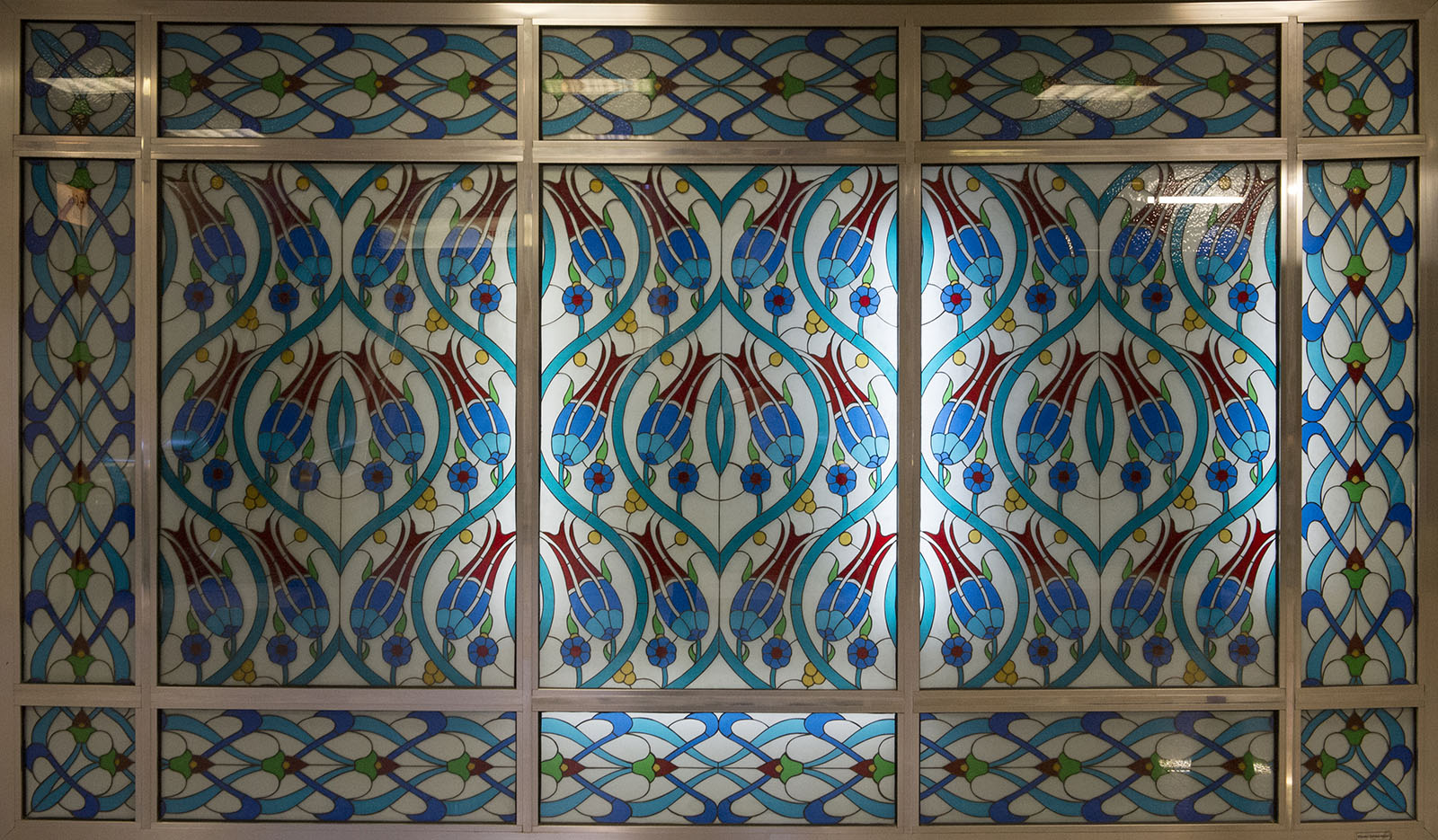
Sişhane metro station tiles
