= Haliç station =

Station of the Istanbul Metro

Haliç
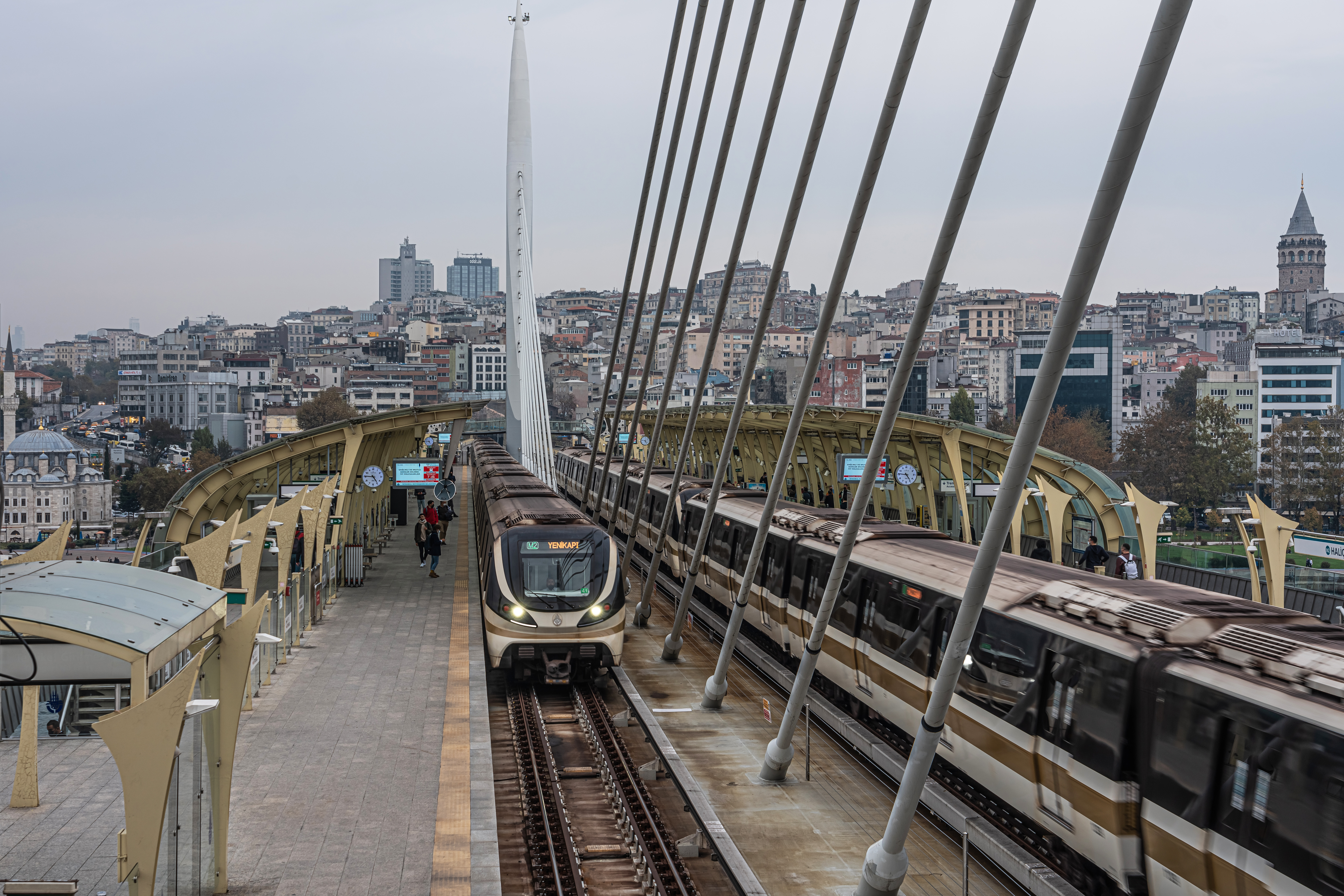

General information
- Location: Golden Horn Metro Bridge, Golden Horn
- Coordinates: 41.0229°N 28.9668°E
- System: Istanbul Metro rapid transit station
- Owner: Istanbul Metro
- Line: M2
- Platforms: 2 side platforms
- Tracks: 2
- Connections: Istanbul Tram: T5 at Küçükpazar; İETT Bus: 26, 26A, 28, 28T, 30D, 31E, 32, 33, 33B, 33E, 33ES, 33TE, 33Y, 35, 36KE, 38E, 46Ç, 47E, 50E, 50P, 54E, 54TE, 66, 70D, 70FE, 70KE, 74, 74A, 77Ç, 78, 78H, 79E, 79GE, 82, 90, 92, 92C, 93, 97A, 97GE, 99A, EM1, EM2, 146B, 336, 336E

Construction
- Structure type: Bridge
- Accessible: Yes

History
- Opened: 15 February 2014
- Electrified: 750V DC Third rail

Services
Preceding station	Istanbul Metro	Following station
Vezneciler towards Yenikapı	M2 Line	Şişhane towards Hacıosman
Location

Haliç is a station on the M2 line of the Istanbul Metro. It is a part of the Golden Horn Metro Bridge and is located between the districts of Fatih and Beyoğlu above the Golden Horn. The station was opened on 15 February 2014 as part of the line's extension to Yenikapı Transfer Center. The station is accessible from both sides of the Golden Horn via pedestrian walkways adjacent to the bridge. Haliç has two side platforms, one for each direction. İETT bus service can be accessed on both sides of the bridge from Tersane Street on the Beyoğlu side and Abdülezelpaşa Street on the Fatih side. Haliç is the only aboveground station on the line.

== Layout ==
Side platform, doors will open on the right
Southbound	← toward Yenikapı ←
Northbound	→ toward Hacıosman →
Side platform, doors will open on the right

== Gallery ==
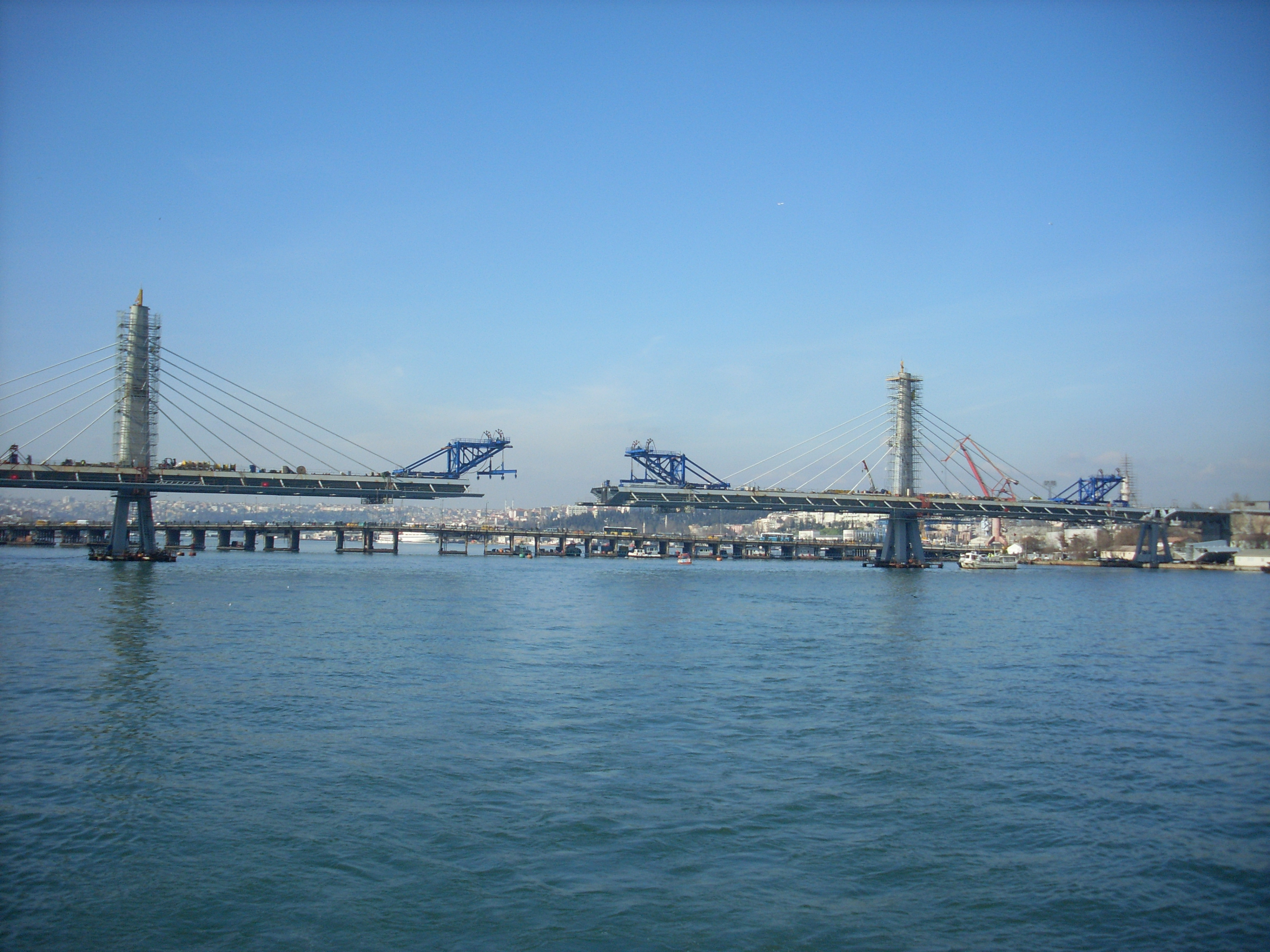
Haliç station under construction. (February 2013)

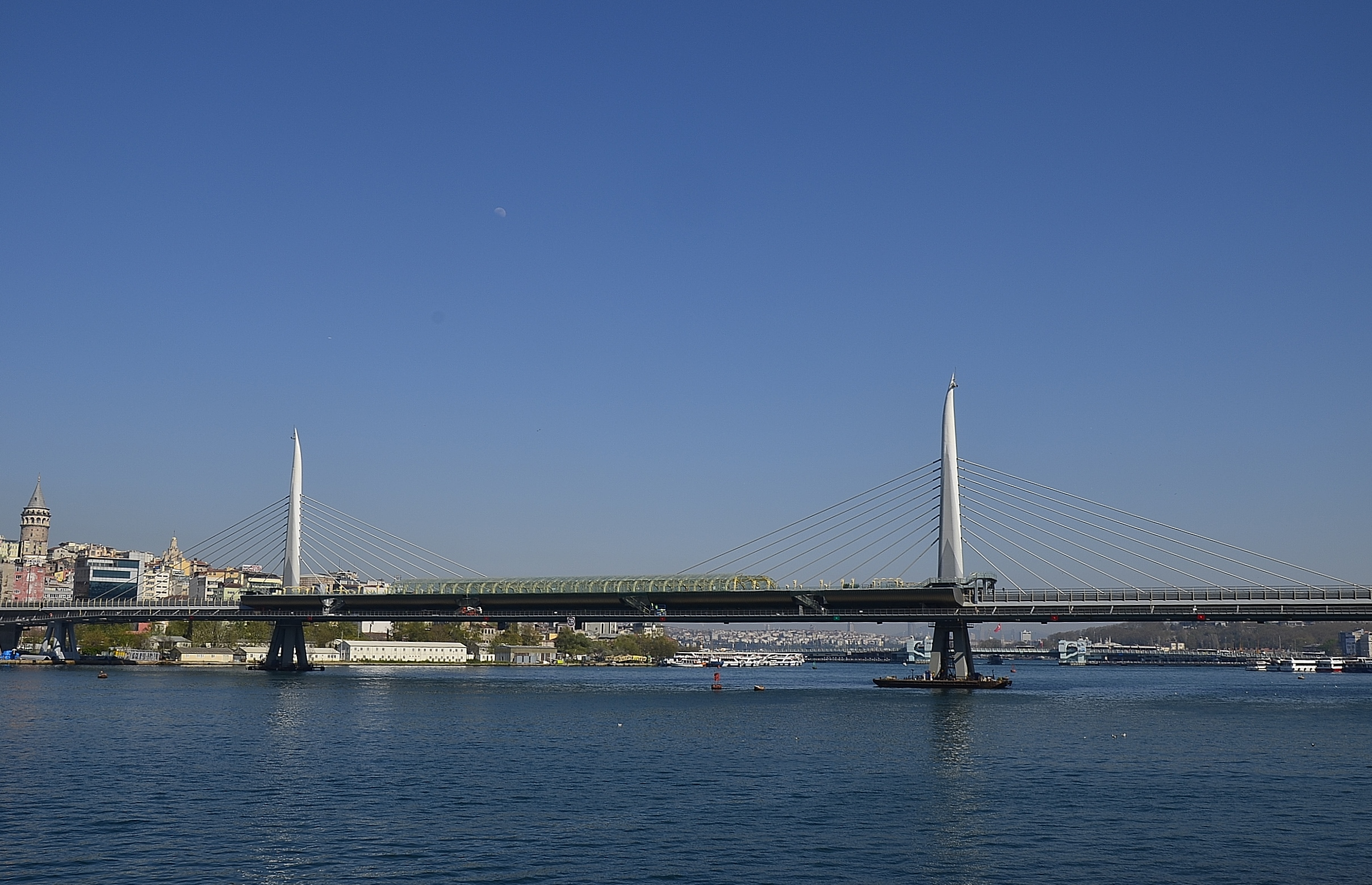
The Golden Horn Metro Bridge seen from the west.

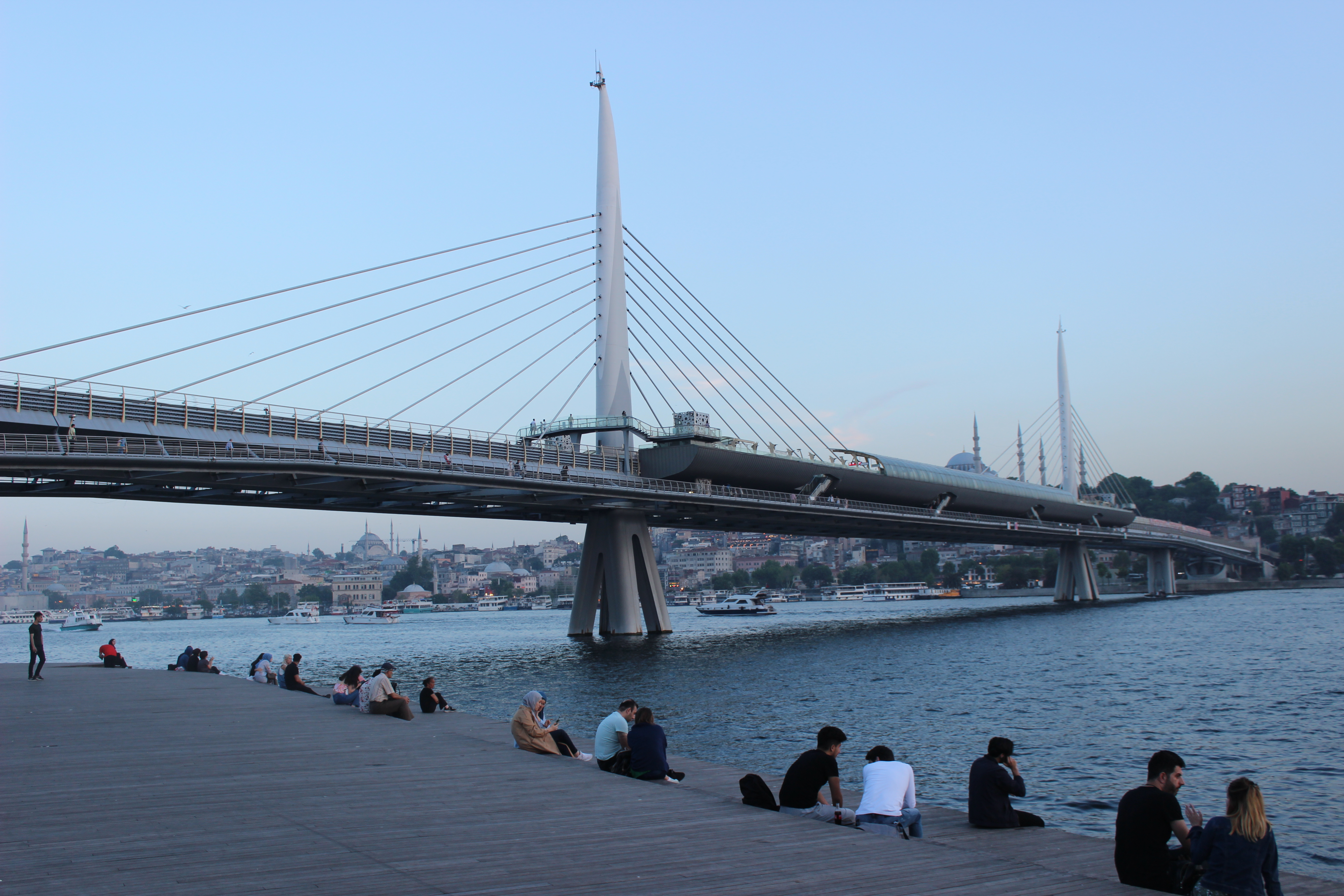
Haliç station as seen from Azapkapı.

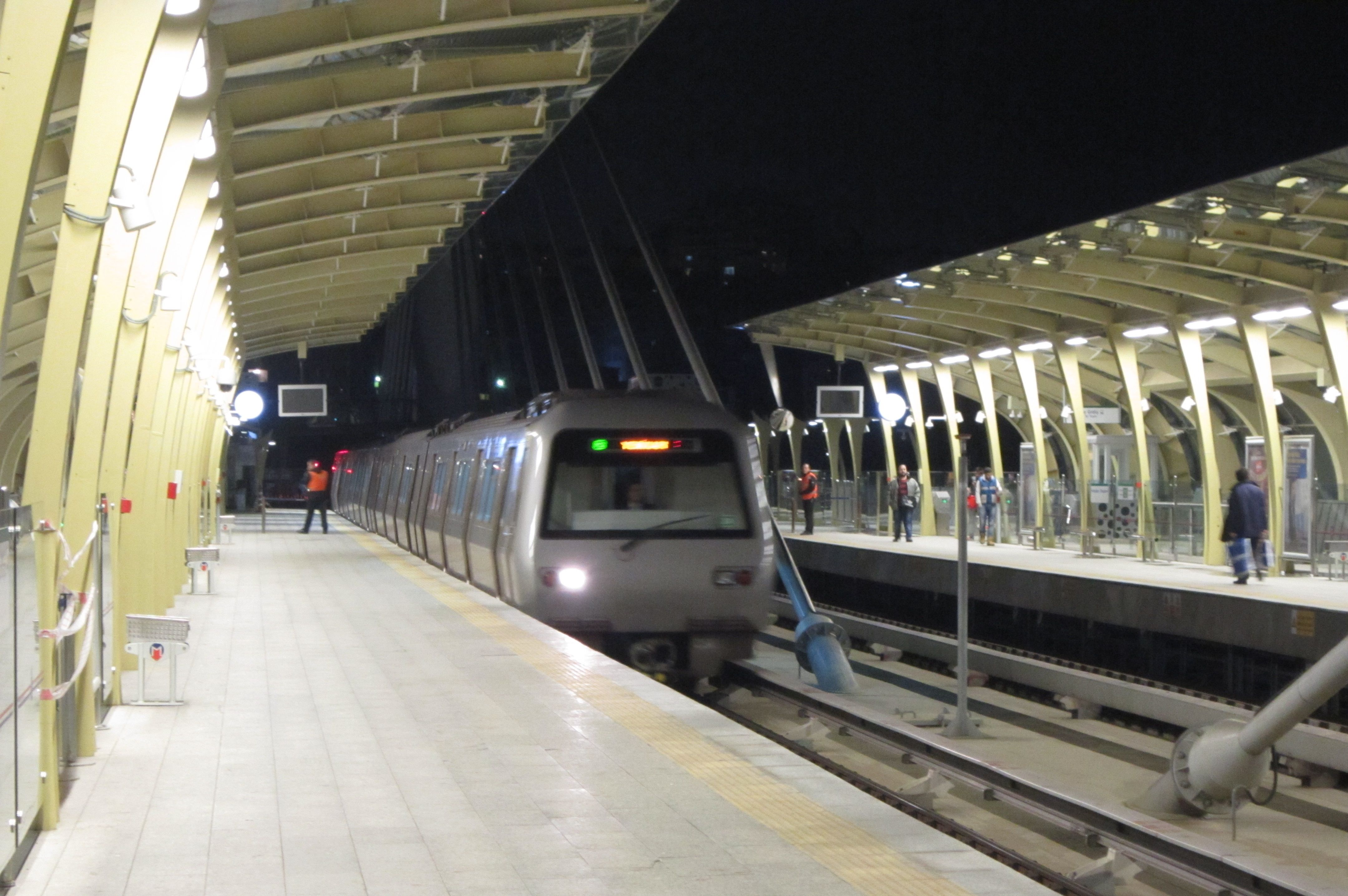
M2 train approaching Haliç platform at night.

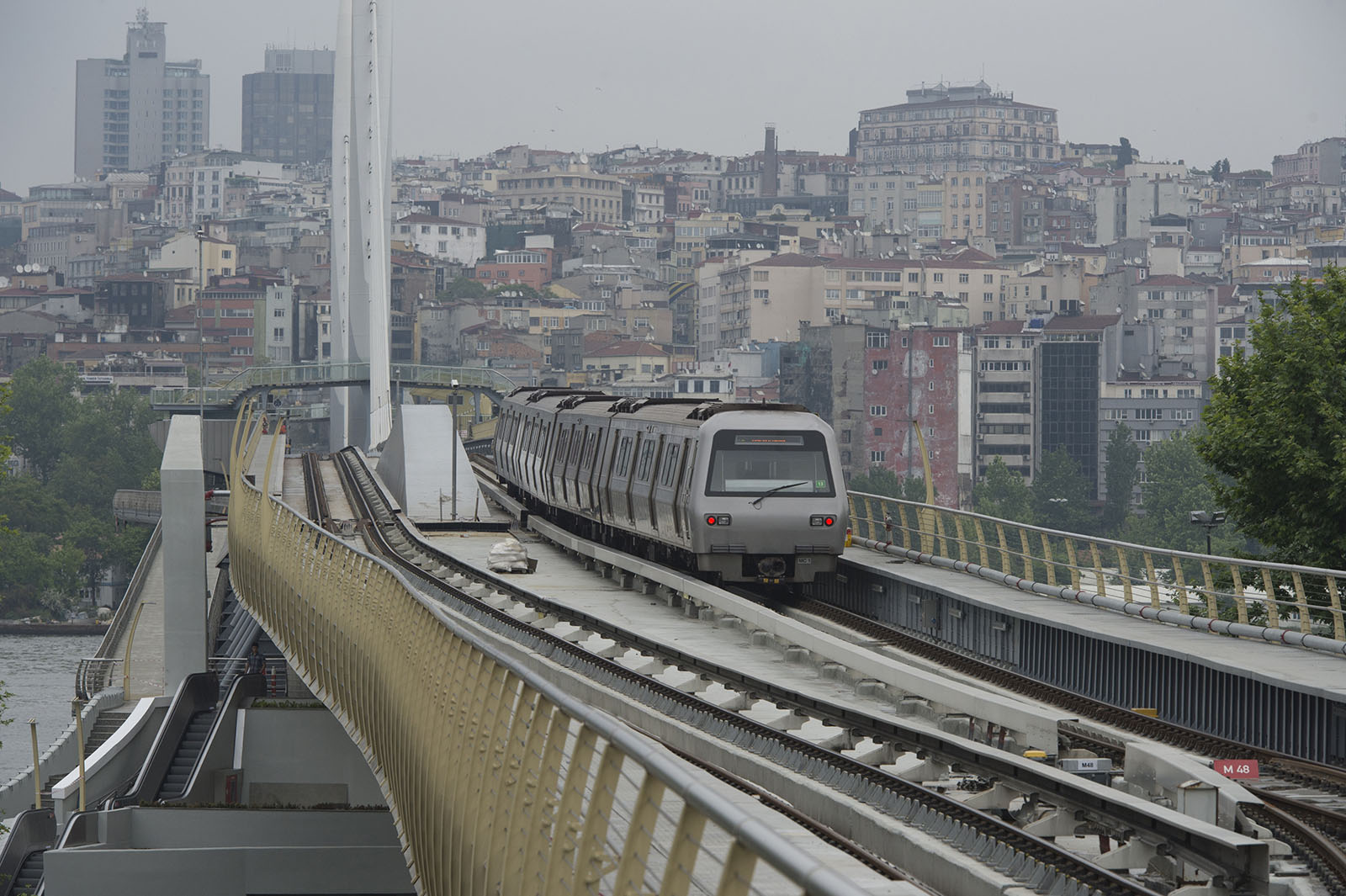
Train arriving from southwest.

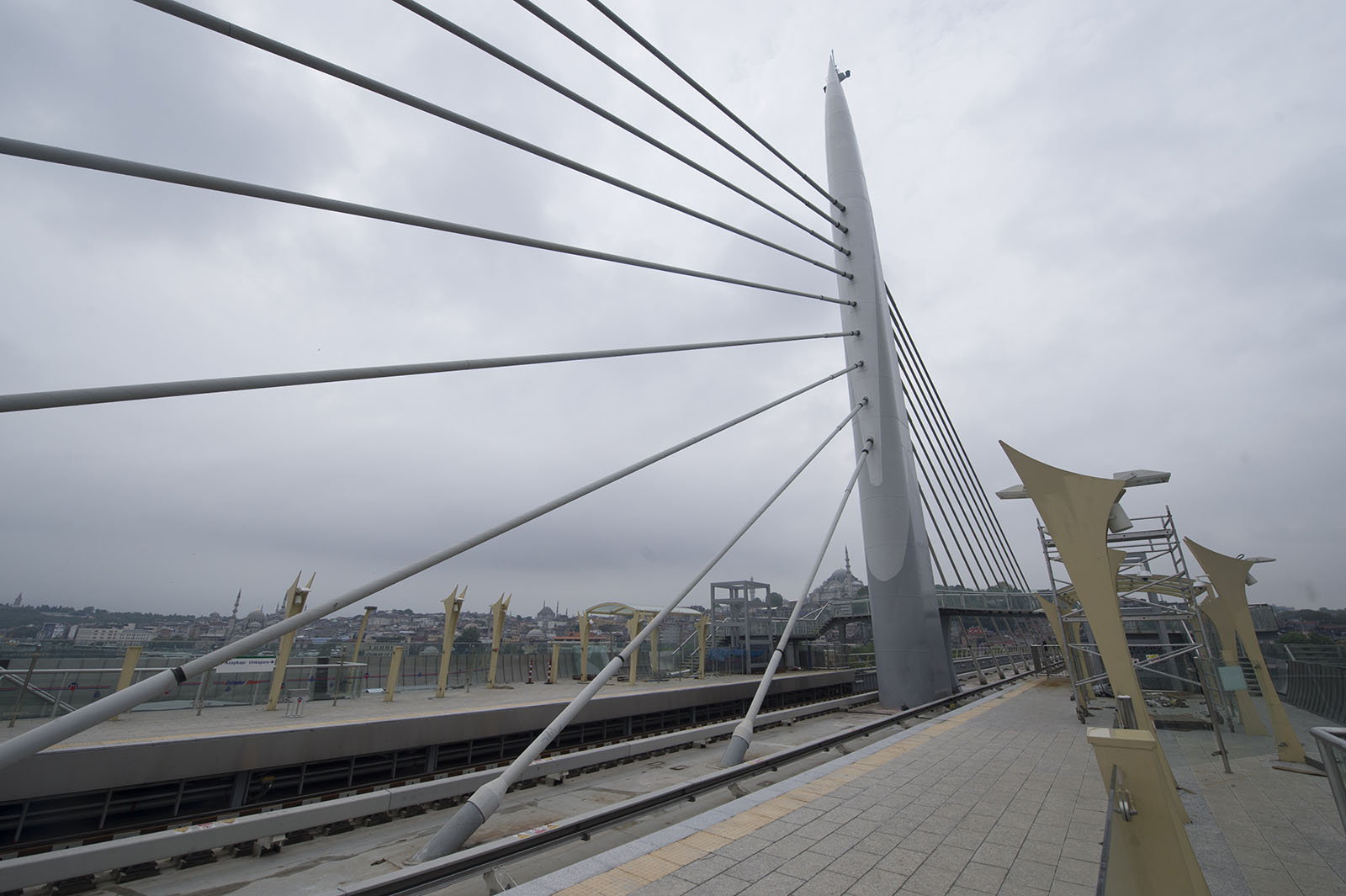
Golden Horn Metro Bridge from platform.

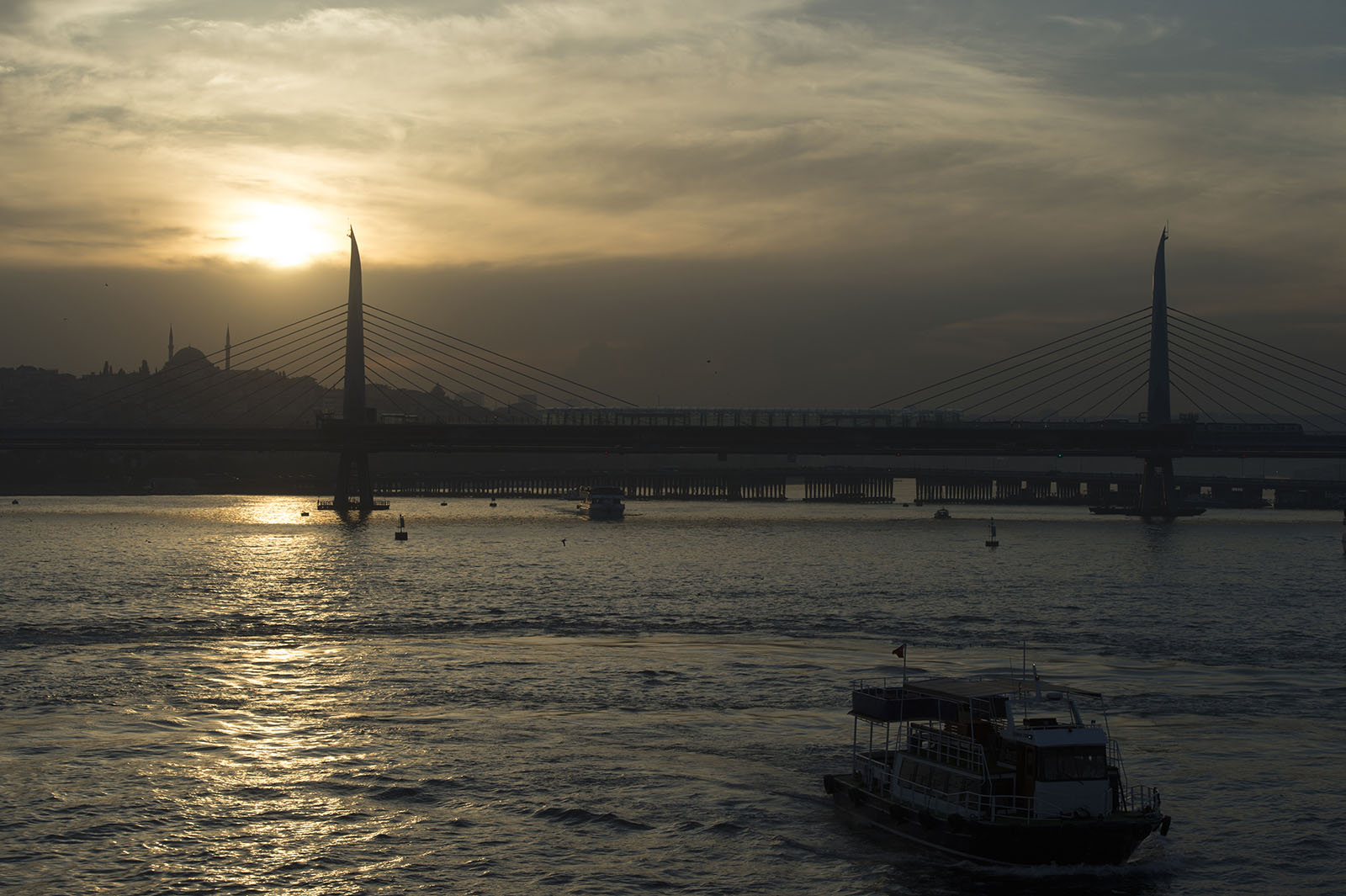
Golden Horn Metro Bridge from Galata Bridge in sunset.
