= Vezneciler station =

Station of the Istanbul Metro

Vezneciler
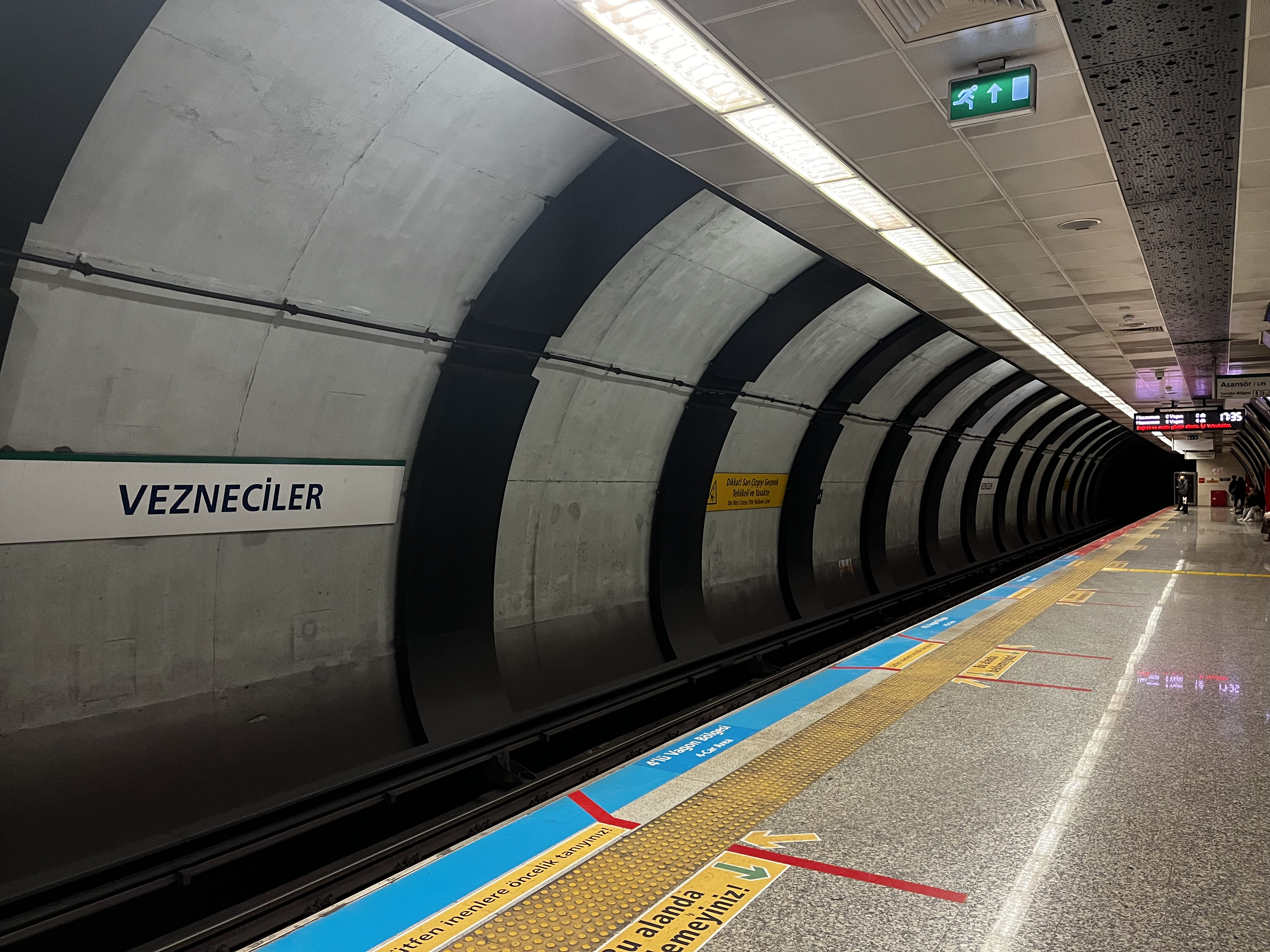

General information
- Location: Şehzadebaşı Cd., Kalenderhane Mah., 34134; Fatih, Istanbul
- Coordinates: 41.0124°N 28.9595°E
- System: Istanbul Metro rapid transit station
- Owner: Istanbul Metropolitan Municipality
- Line: M2
- Platforms: 1 island platform
- Tracks: 2
- Connections: Istanbul Tram: T1 at Laleli-Üniversite; İETT Bus: 36A, 36V, 38B, 50V, 77A, 86V

Construction
- Structure type: Underground
- Accessible: Yes

History
- Opened: 16 March 2014
- Electrified: 750V DC Third rail

Services
Preceding station	Istanbul Metro	Following station
Yenikapı Terminus	M2 Line	Haliç towards Hacıosman
Location

Vezneciler is a station on the M2 line of the Istanbul Metro. The station is located under Şehzadebaşı Street and 16 Mart Şehitleri Street in the historical Fatih district of Istanbul. Opened on 16 March 2014, Vezneciler is the most recently opened station on the M2 line. During the inauguration the station was dedicated to Ottoman police officers who were killed during a conflict with British forces during the Occupation of Constantinople in 1920. Istanbul University's main campus, Beyazıt Square and the Şehzade Mosque are a few landmarks in the vicinity of the station. On 7 June 2016, a bomb reportedly targeting a police bus struck around this station.

== Layout ==
Southbound	← toward Yenikapı
Island platform
Northbound	toward Hacıosman →
