= Hadika Stone =

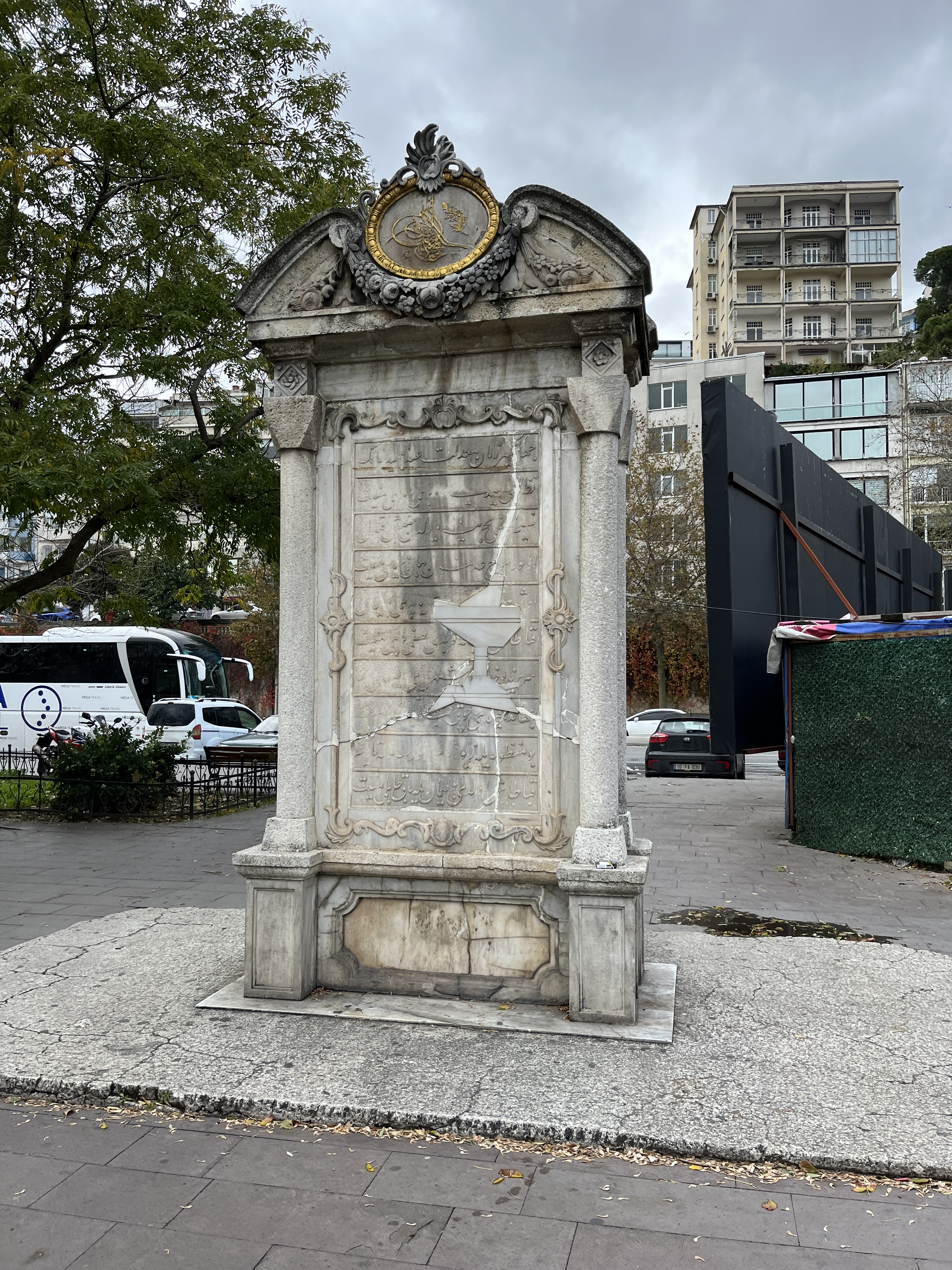

The Hadika Stone is located in Istanbul, Turkey. The stone was erected on the Kabataş dock by Sultan Abdülmecid in 1850.
