= Taksim station =

Station of the Istanbul Metro

Taksim (M2) Taksim (F1)
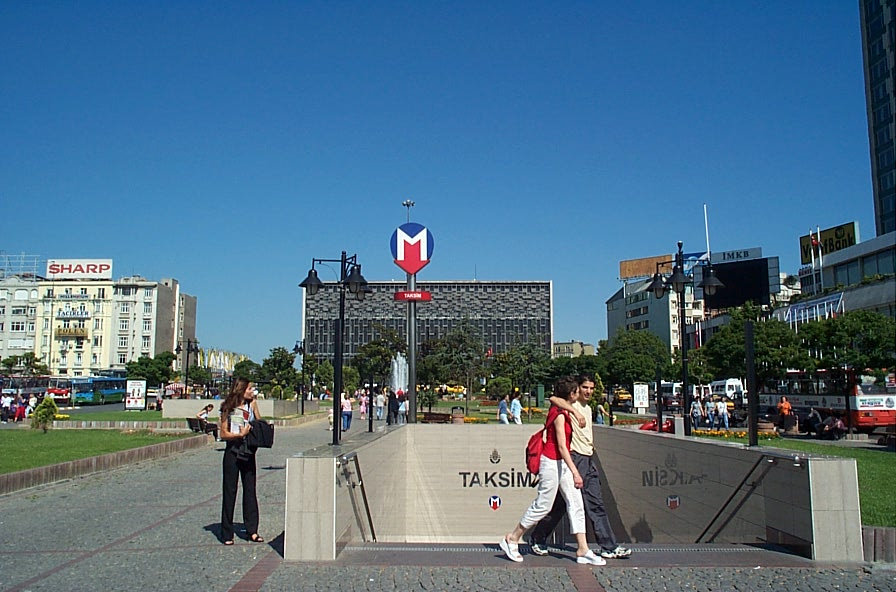

General information
- Location: Taksim Meydanı, Gümüşsuyu Mah., 34437; Beyoğlu, Istanbul
- Coordinates: 41.0369°N 28.9864°E
- System: Istanbul Metro rapid transit station
- Owner: Istanbul Metro
- Lines: M2; F1
- Platforms: 1 Island platform
- Tracks: 2 (M2); 1 (F1)
- Connections: Taksim-Tünel Heritage tram İETT Bus: 25G, 32T, 35C, 40, 40T, 42T, 46Ç, 46E, 46KT, 46T, 48N, 48T, 50G, 50N, 50T, 54Ç, 54E, 54HT, 54K, 54ÖR, 54P, 54T, 54TE, 55ET, 55G, 55T, 66, 69A, 70FE, 70FY, 70KE, 70KY, 71T, 72T, 72YT, 73, 73F, 74, 74A, 76D, 79T, 80T, 85T, 87, 89C, 89T, 92T, 93T, 97BT, 97T, 129T, 145T, 256, 559C, AVR2, DT1, DT2, E-56, E-59, SG-2, T2, Istanbul Dolmuş: Beşiktaş-Taksim, Bostancı-Taksim, Kadıköy-Taksim, Taksim-Aksaray, Taksim-Bakırköy, Taksim-Cevizlibağ, Taksim-Florya, Taksim-Kocamustafapaşa, Taksim-Topkapı, Taksim-Yenibosna, Taksim-Yeşilköy, Teşvikiye-Taksim; Havabüs: Taksim-SAW

Construction
- Structure type: Underground
- Accessible: Yes

History
- Opened: 16 September 2000 (M2 platform); 29 June 2006 (F1 platform)
- Electrified: 750V DC Third rail

Services
| Preceding station | Istanbul Metro | Following station |
|---|---|---|
| Şişhane towards Yenikapı | M2 Line | Osmanbey towards Hacıosman |
| Terminus | F1 | Kabataş Terminus |
Location

Taksim is an underground rapid transit complex. It is located in central Beyoğlu under Taksim Square in Istanbul. The complex is serviced by the M2 line of the Istanbul Metro and the Kabataş-Taksim Funicular (F1) line. Taksim was opened on 16 September 2000 as the southern terminus of the M2 until the line was extended to Yenikapı in 2014. On 29 June 2006 the Kabataş-Taksim funicular station was opened, offering shuttle service to Kabataş. Taksim is the busiest station on the M2 Line as well as the Istanbul Metro. Connections to Havabüs express bus service to Sabiha Gökçen Airport are available.

== 2013 Gezi Park protests ==
In the beginning of June 2013, during the height of the Gezi Park protests, Taksim square was the scene of large clashes between police and protesters. Due to the use of overwhelming force and tear gas, many protesters sought refuge in nearby hotels as well as Taksim station. Police however followed protesters into the station and fired tear gas grenades into the underground complex further harming the protesters as well as tourists and other civilians on the platforms below. Due to these clashes M2 service was suspended until the tear gas was cleared from the complex.

== Layout ==
| Southbound | ← toward Yenikapı |
Island platform
| Northbound | toward Hacıosman → |

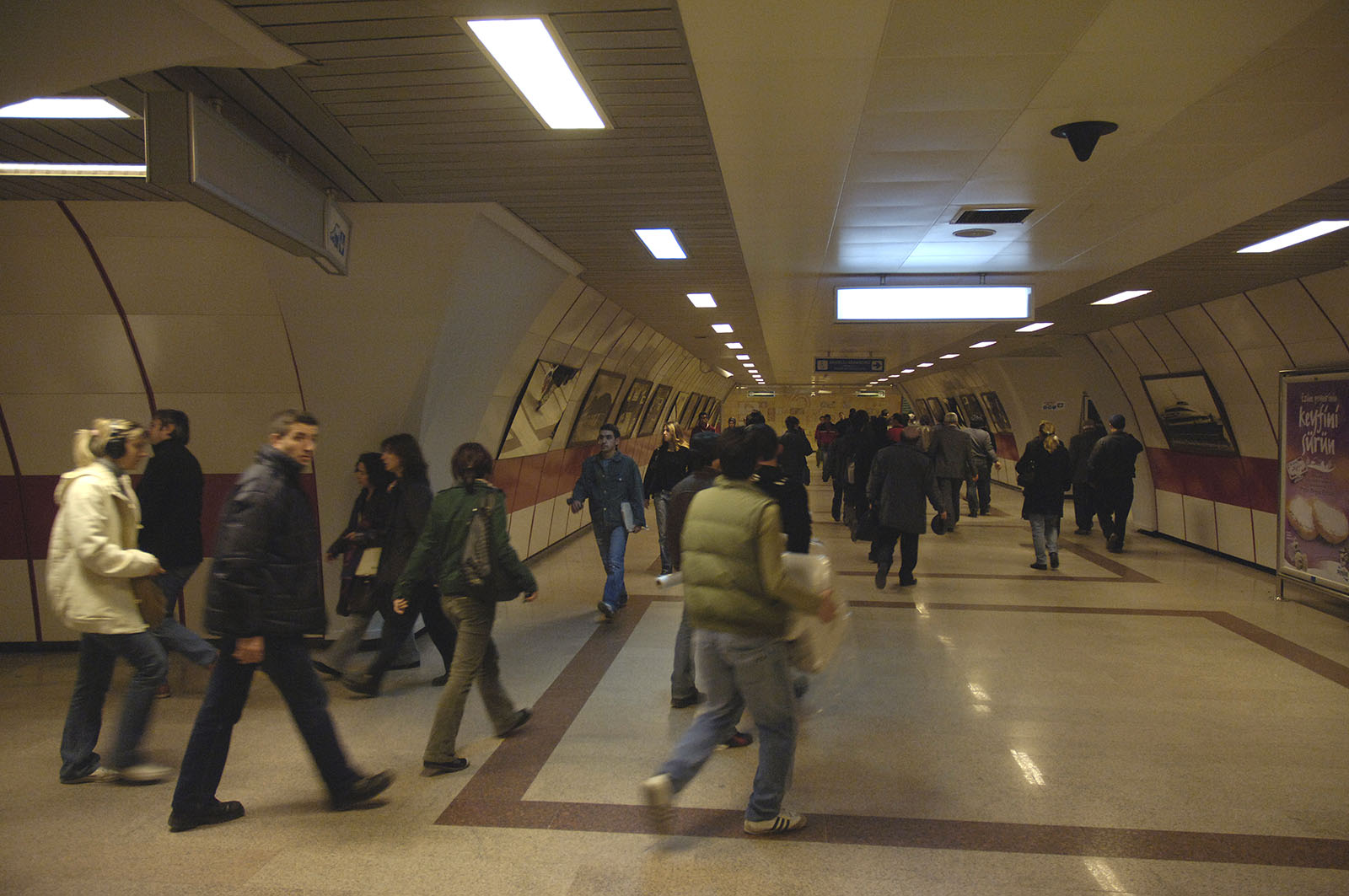
Taksim metro station

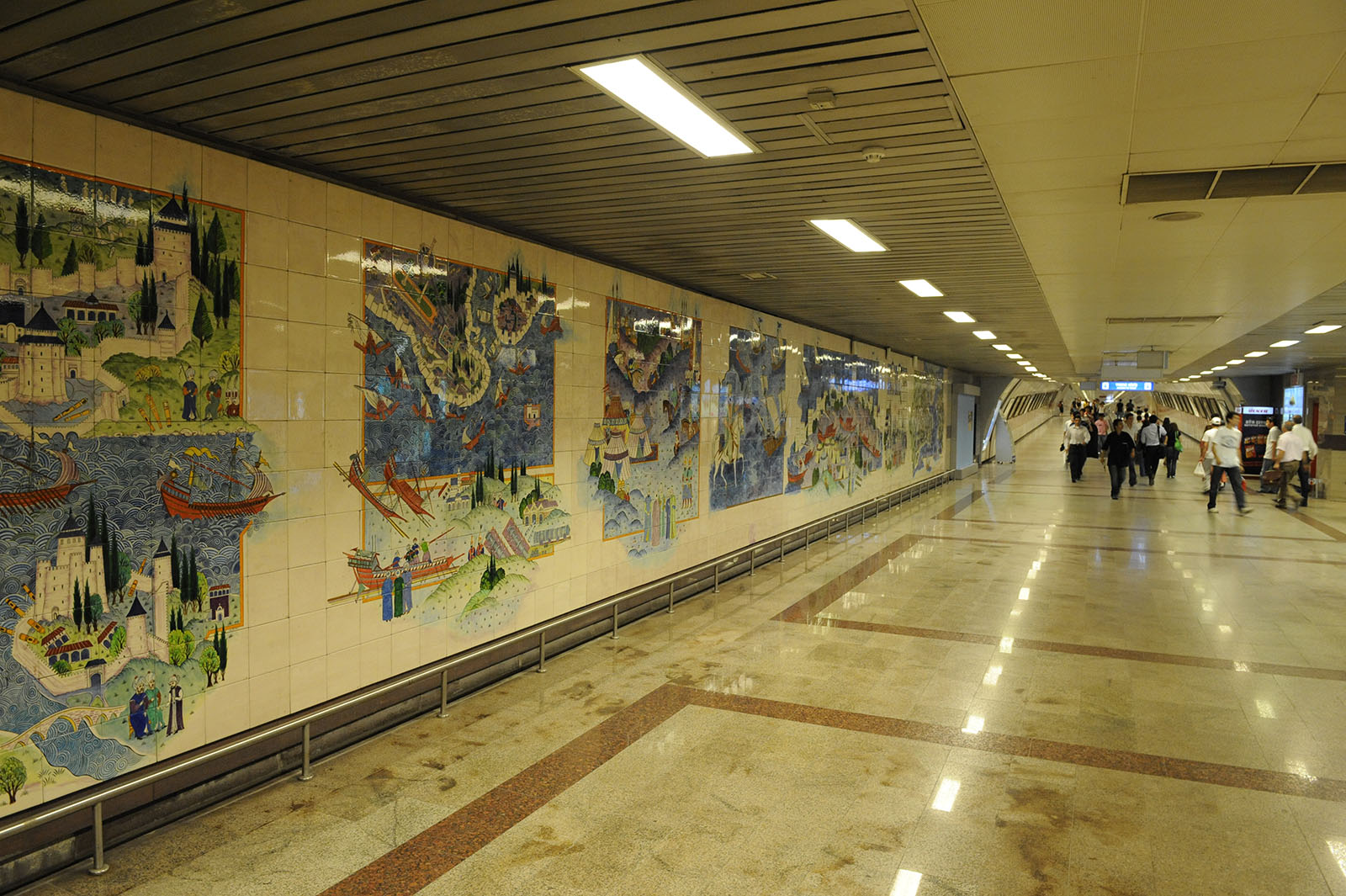
Taksim metro station tiles

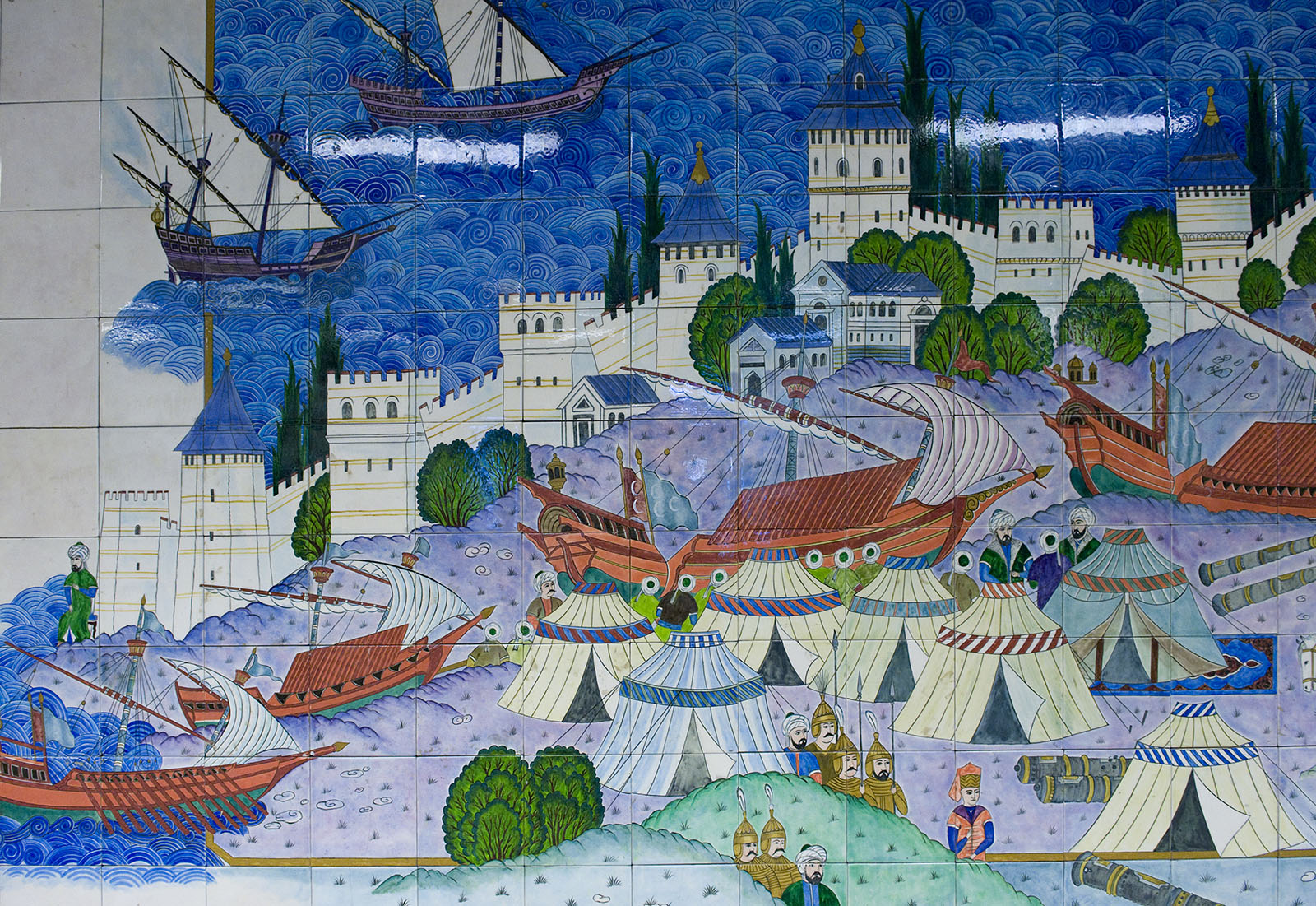
Taksim metro station tiles

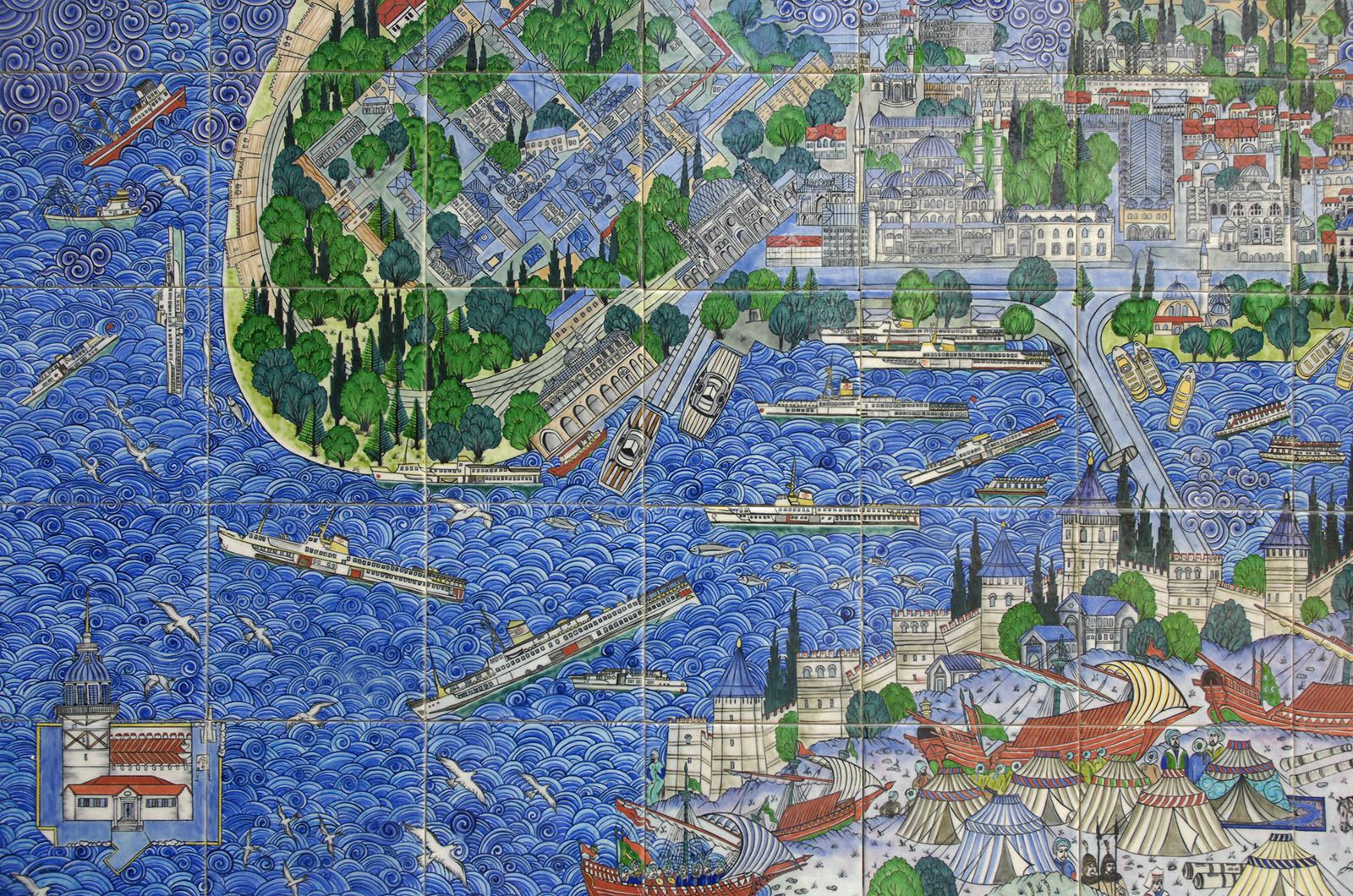
Taksim metro station tiles

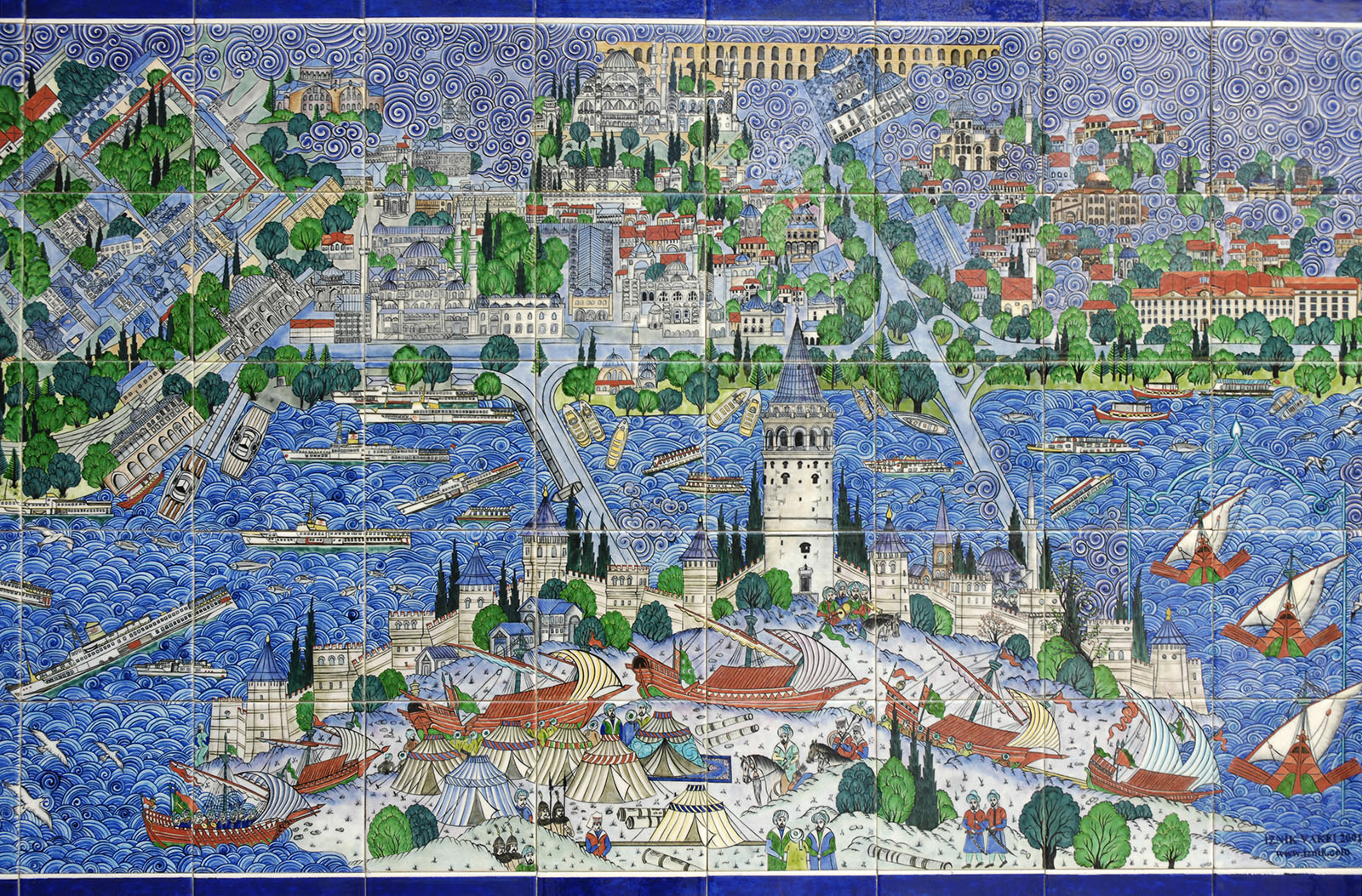
Taksim metro station tiles

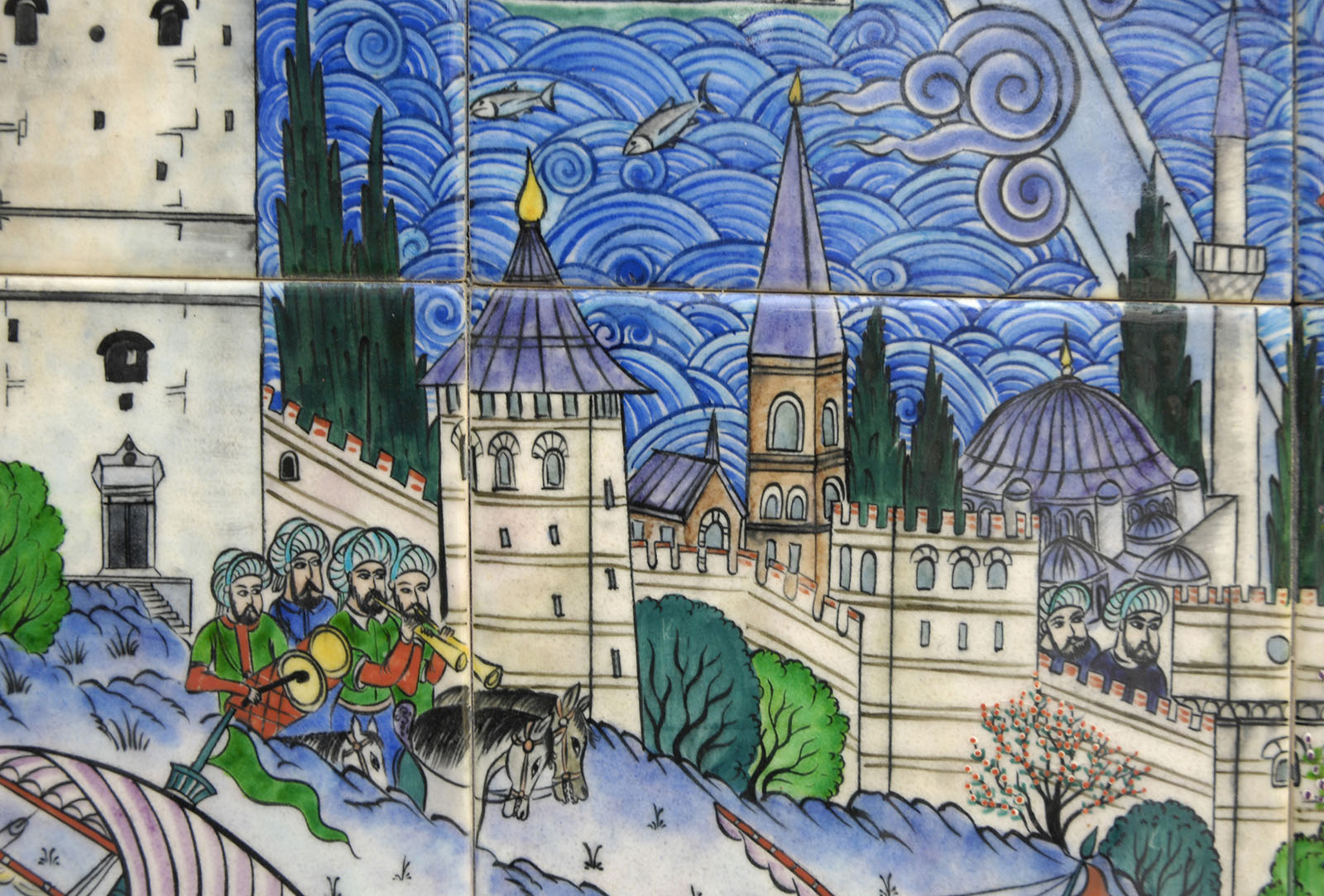
Taksim metro station tiles

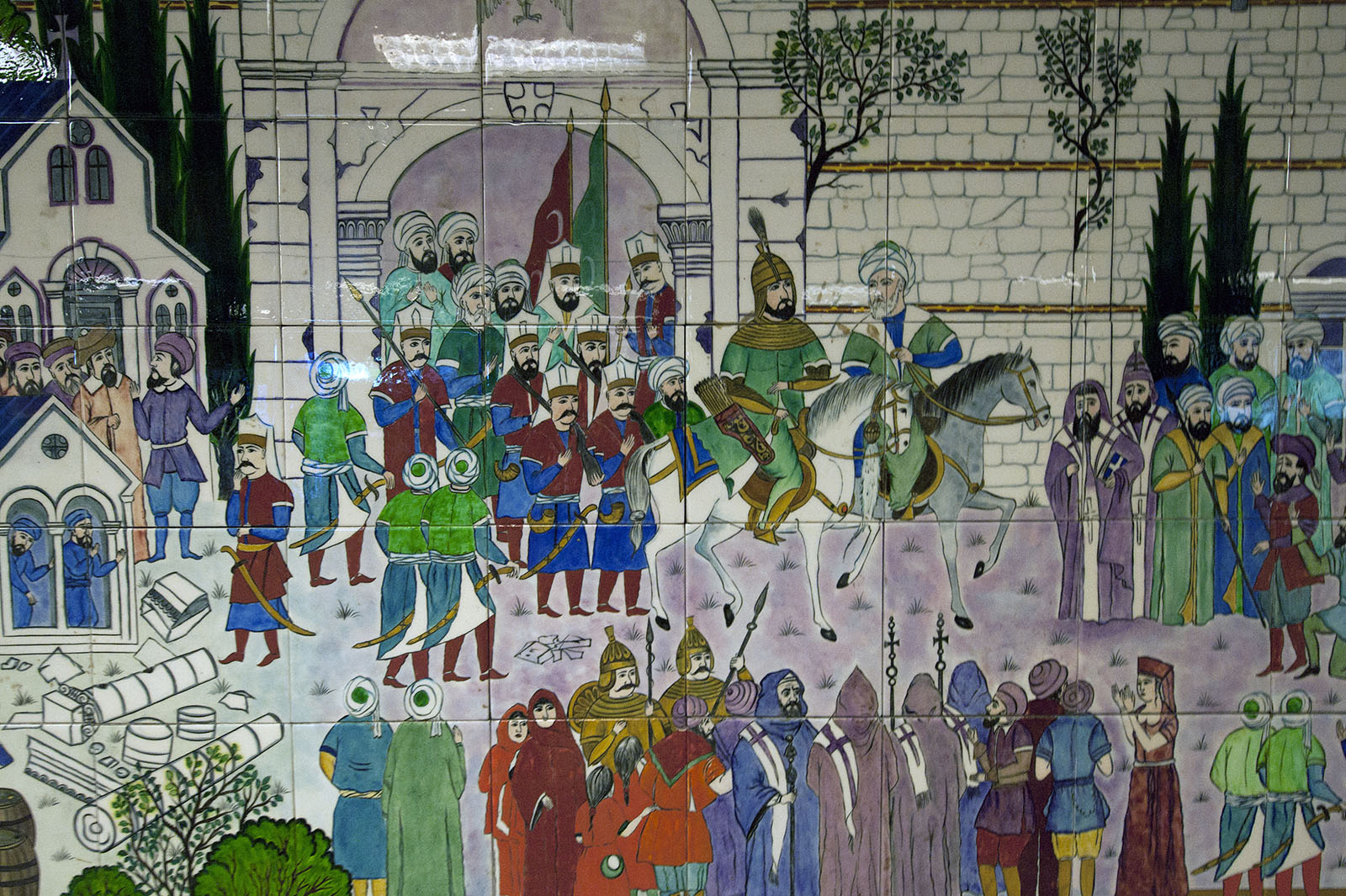
Taksim metro station tiles

== Nearby places of interest ==
- Taksim Square
  - Republic Monument
- Gezi Park
- Atatürk Cultural Center
