= F1 Taksim–Kabataş funicular line =

Underground funicular in Istanbul, Turkey

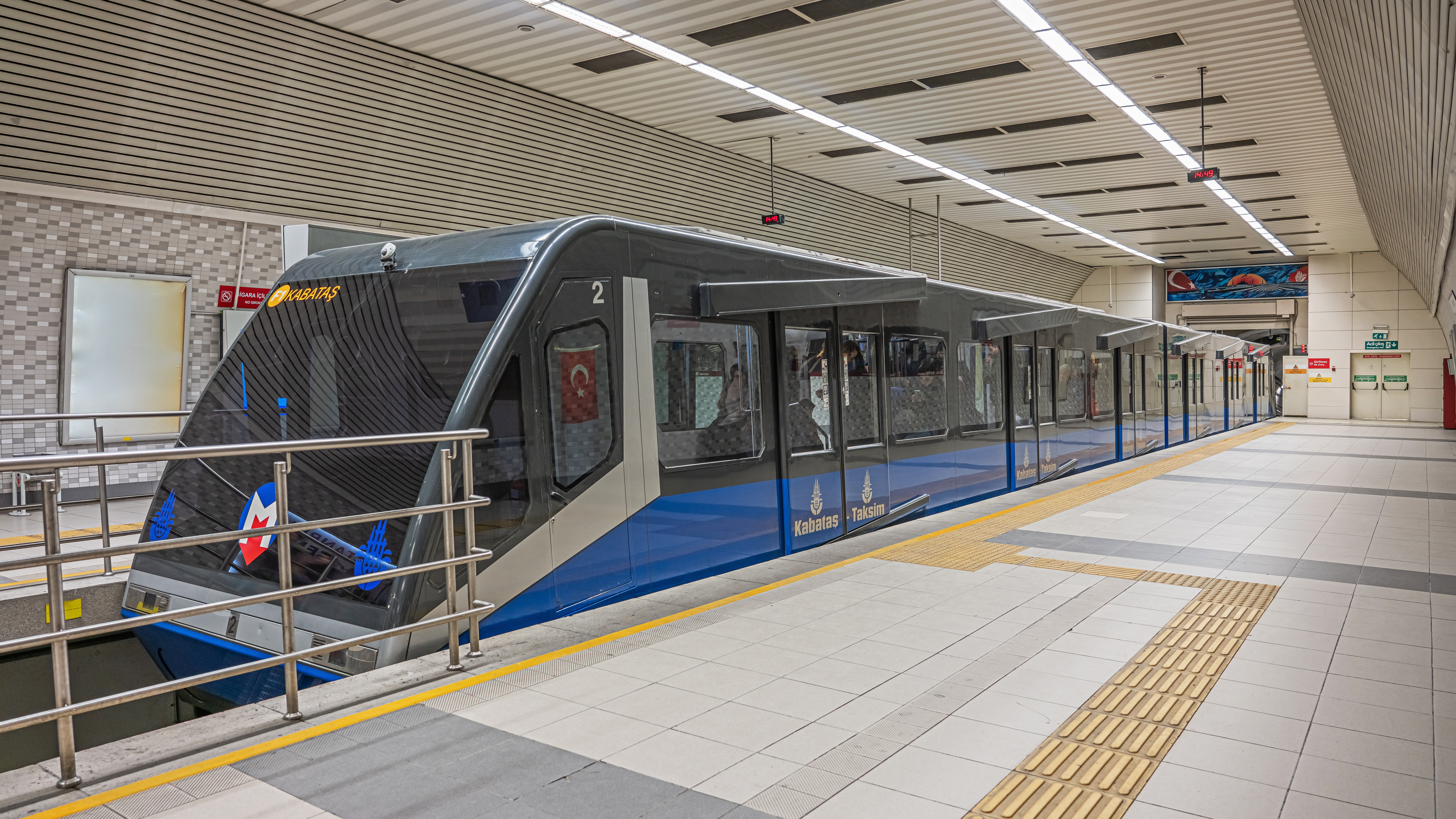

Overview
- Native name: F1 Taksim–Kabataş füniküler hattı
- Status: Operating
- Line number: F1
- Locale: Istanbul, Turkey
- Stations: 2
- Website: https://www.metro.istanbul/Hatlarimiz/HatDetay?hat=F1

Service
- Type: Funicular
- Operator(s): Metro Istanbul
- Daily ridership: 35,000

History
- Opened: 29 June 2006

Technical
- Line length: 594 m (1,949 ft)
- Number of tracks: 1 (with a passing loop)
- Track gauge: 1,435 mm (4 ft 8 1/2 in) standard gauge
- Maximum incline: 22%

The F1 Taksim–Kabataş funicular line (Turkish: F1 Taksim–Kabataş füniküler hattı) is an underground funicular in Istanbul, Turkey. It serves the F1 line of the Istanbul metro, which connects the hubs at Taksim Square and Kabataş, Istanbul.

== Overview ==
The funicular was built by the Doppelmayr Garaventa Group and opened on June 29, 2006, the funicular is operated by Metro İstanbul company, a subsidiary of Istanbul Metropolitan Municipality. The ride on the 594 m (1,949 ft) line takes 2.5 minutes. As of 2016 the daily ridership was 30,000 passengers between the operating hours from 6:15 to 0:00, daily number of trips were 195, with a headway of 3 minutes during peak hours.

== Stations ==
No	Station	District	Transfer	Type	Notes
1	Taksim	Beyoğlu	・ İETT Bus: 25G, 32T, 35C, 40, 40T, 42T, 46Ç, 46E, 46KT, 46T, 48N, 48T, 50G, 50N, 50T, 54Ç, 54E, 54HT, 54K, 54ÖR, 54P, 54T, 54TE, 55ET, 55G, 55T, 66, 69A, 70FE, 70FY, 70KE, 70KY, 71T, 72T, 72YT, 73, 73F, 74, 74A, 76D, 79T, 80T, 85T, 87, 89C, 89T, 92T, 93T, 97BT, 97T, 129T, 145T, 256, 559C, DT1, DT2, E-56, E-59	Underground	Taksim Square・Taksim Mosque
2	Kabataş	Beyoğlu	(under construction)・・ (Kabataş Pier); İETT Bus: 22, 22B, 25E, 26, 26A, 26B, 27E, 27SE, 28, 28T, 29C, 29D, 30D, 41E, 43R, 58A, 58N, 58S, 58UL, 62, 63, 70KE	Underground	Kabataş Erkek Lisesi

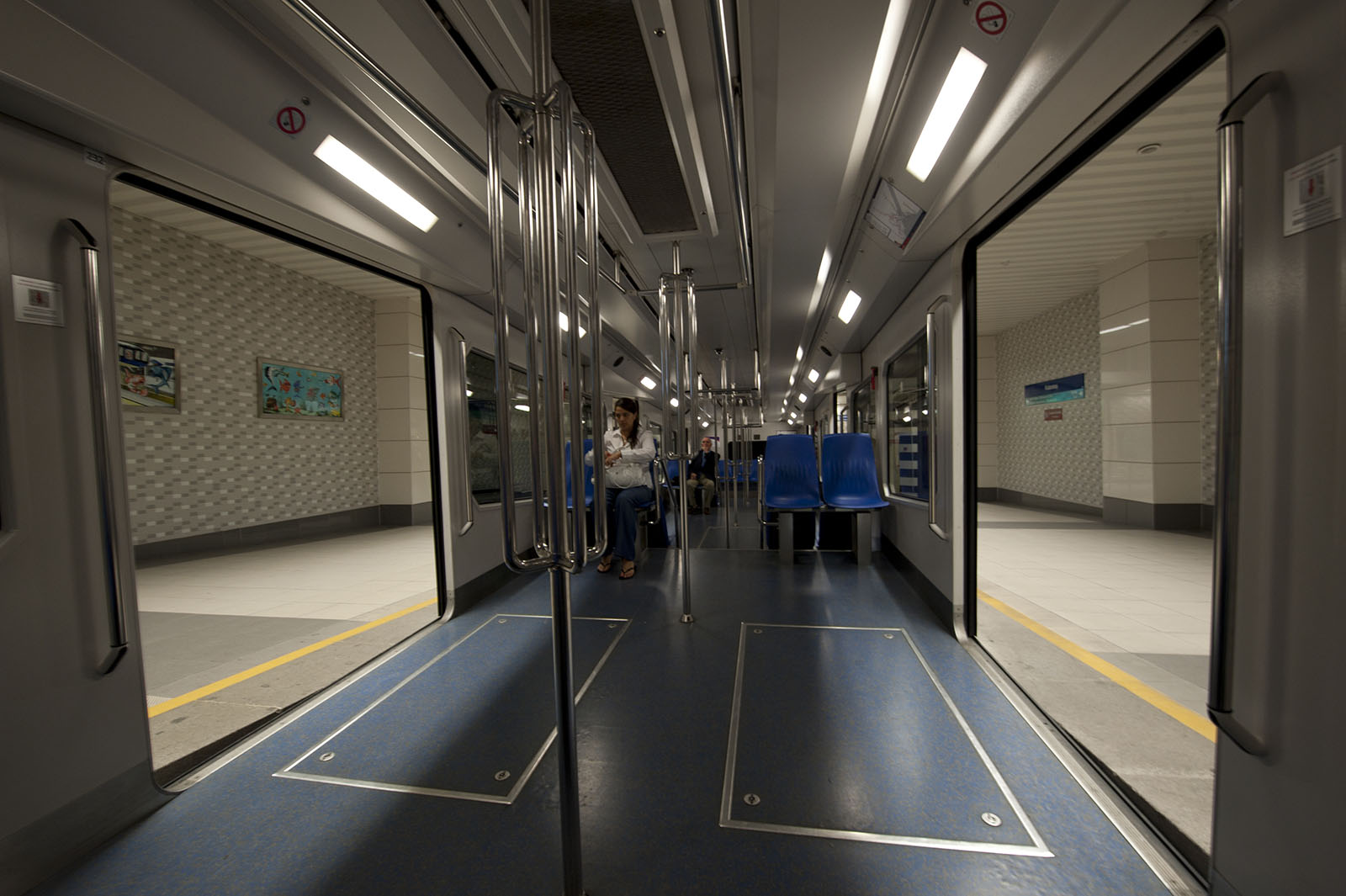
Funicular Kabataş station Wait for departure

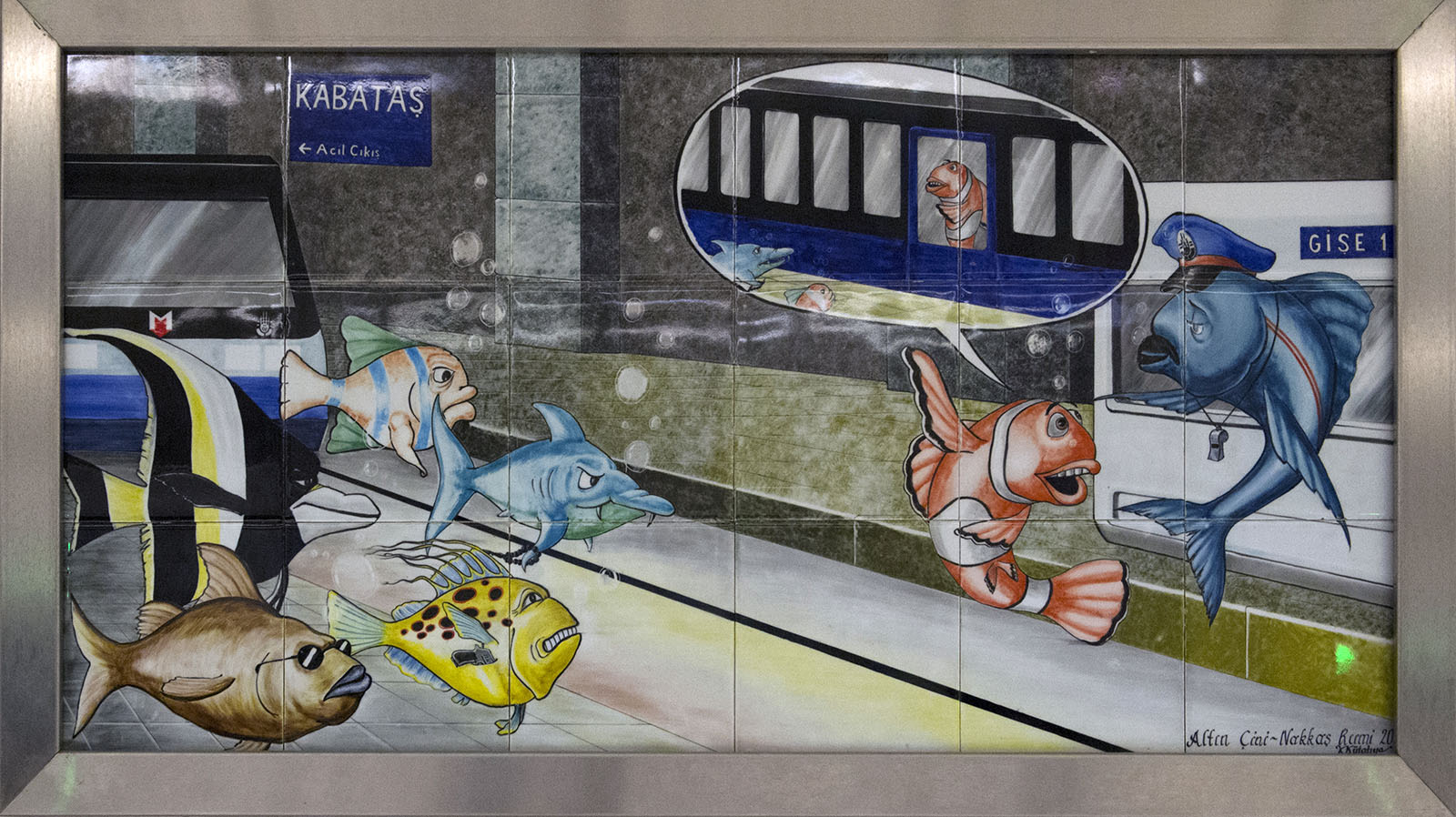
Funicular Kabataş station decoration

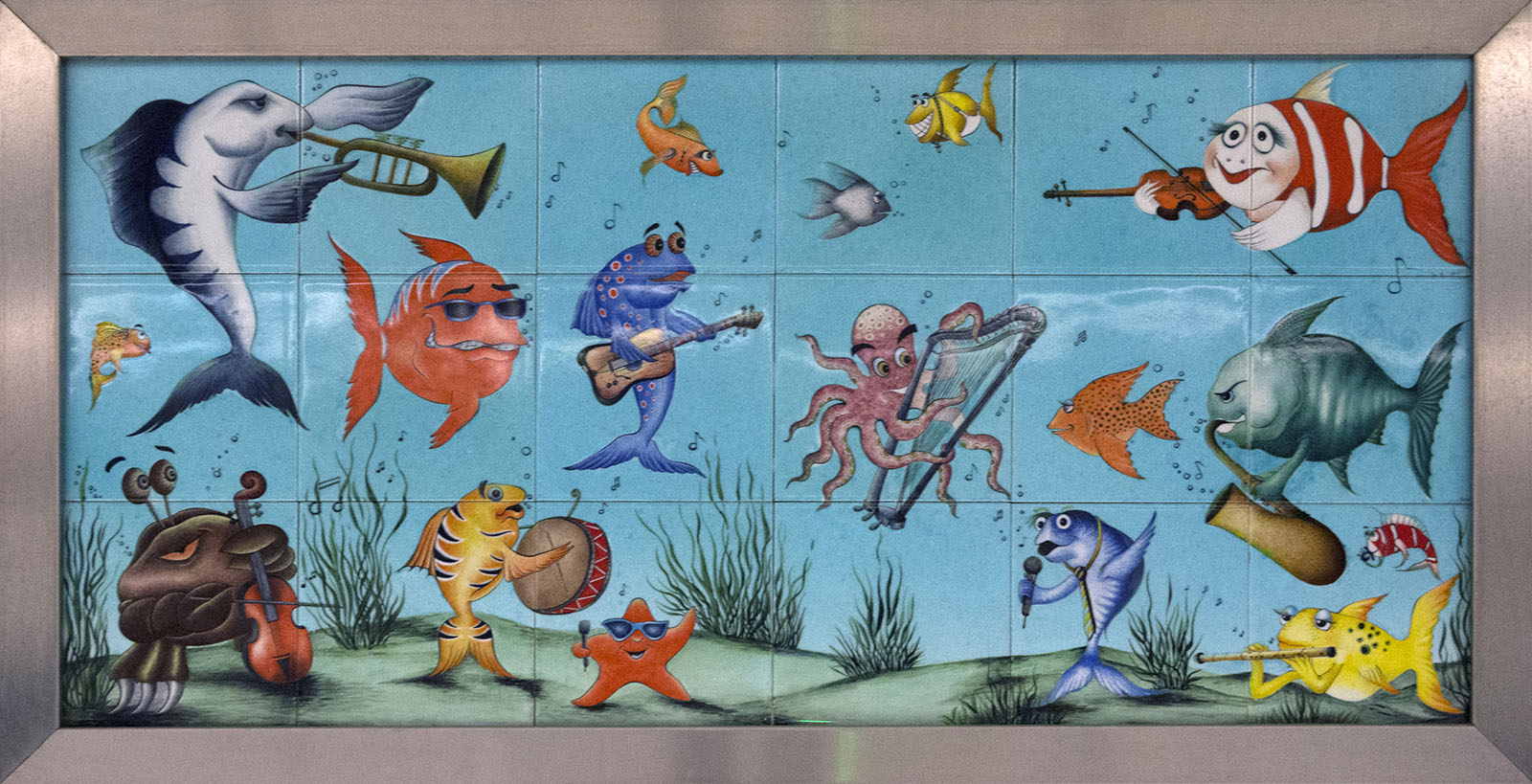
Funicular Kabataş station

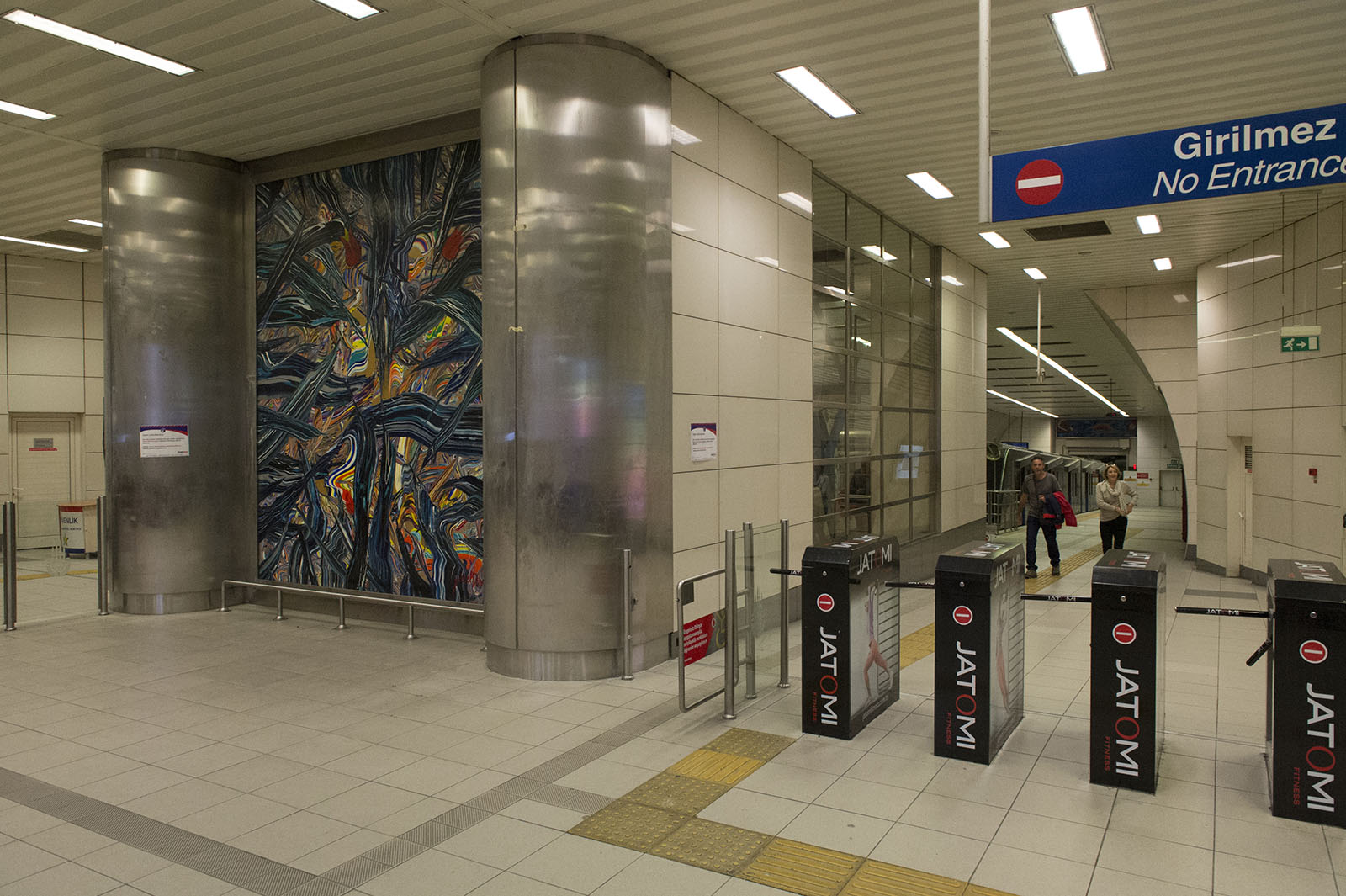
Funicular Taksim station

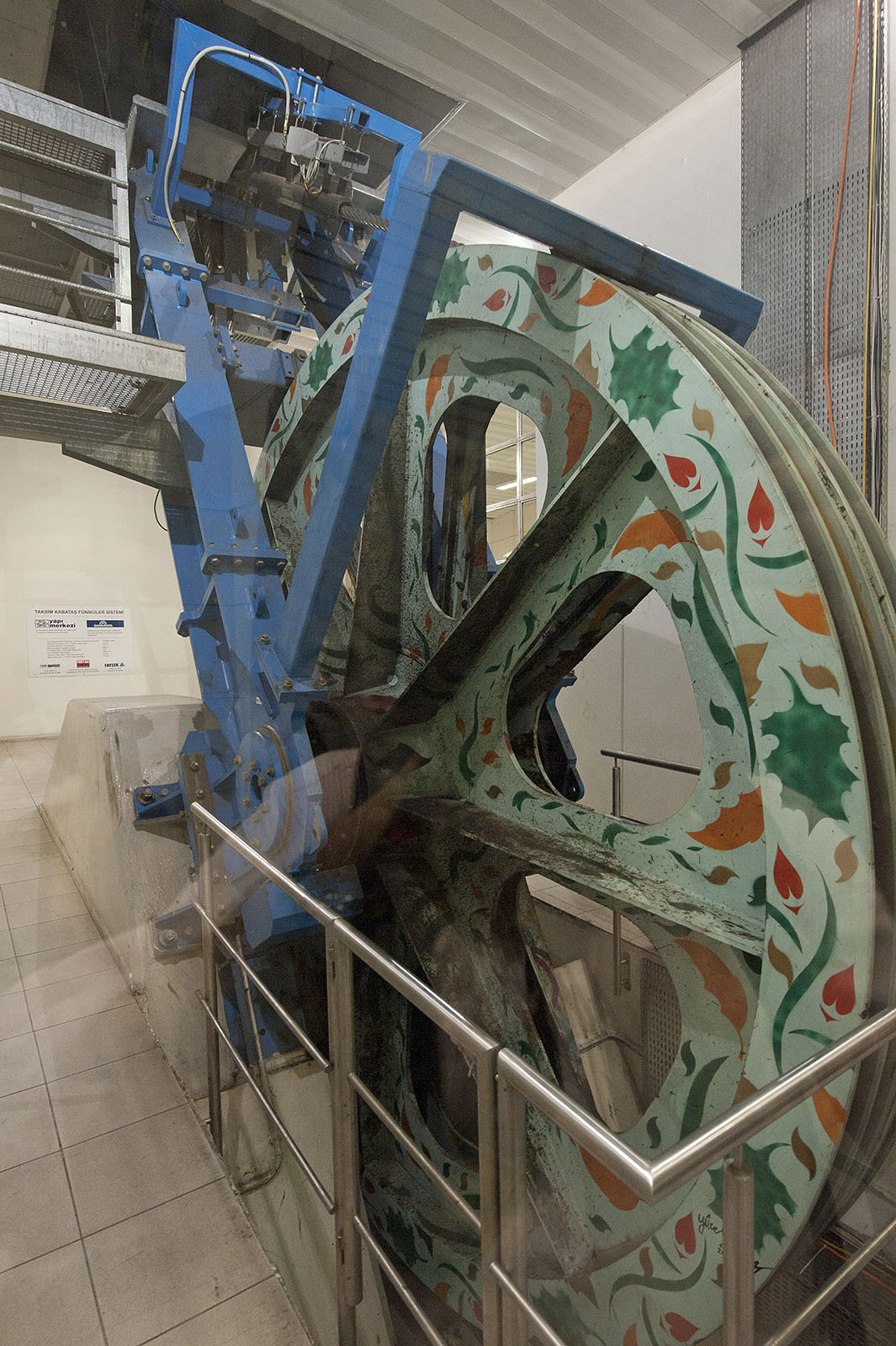
Funicular Taksim station

== Ridership ==
According to Metro Istanbul, the funicular line has transported 5.072.731 passengers in 2023.

== See also ==
- Istanbul Tünel funicular
- List of funicular railways
