= Beşiktaş station =

Station of the Istanbul Metro

Beşiktaş

General information
- Location: Barbaros Blv., Cihannüma Mah. 34353; Beşiktaş, Istanbul
- Coordinates: 41.0436°N 29.0074°E
- System: Istanbul Metro rapid transit station
- Owner: Istanbul Metropolitan Municipality
- Operator: Metro Istanbul
- Line: M7
- Platforms: 1 Island platform
- Tracks: 2

Construction
- Structure type: Underground
- Cycle facilities: Yes
- Accessible: Yes

Other information
- Status: M7 Under Construction

History
- Opening: 2028
- Electrified: 1500V DC Overhead Line

Services
Preceding station	Istanbul Metro	Following station
Future Service
Yıldız towards Mahmutbey	M7 Line	Kabataş Terminus
Location

Beşiktaş is a currently under construction underground metro station located on the M7 line of the Istanbul Metro, Currently on hold due to archeological excavation, and it is planned to have a museum in the station when completed. It is planned to be open in 2028, as there have also been archeological sites discovered at the Kabataş station.

== Layout ==
Westbound	← toward Yıldız
Island platform
Eastbound	toward Kabataş →
