= Beymen =

Turkish department store chain

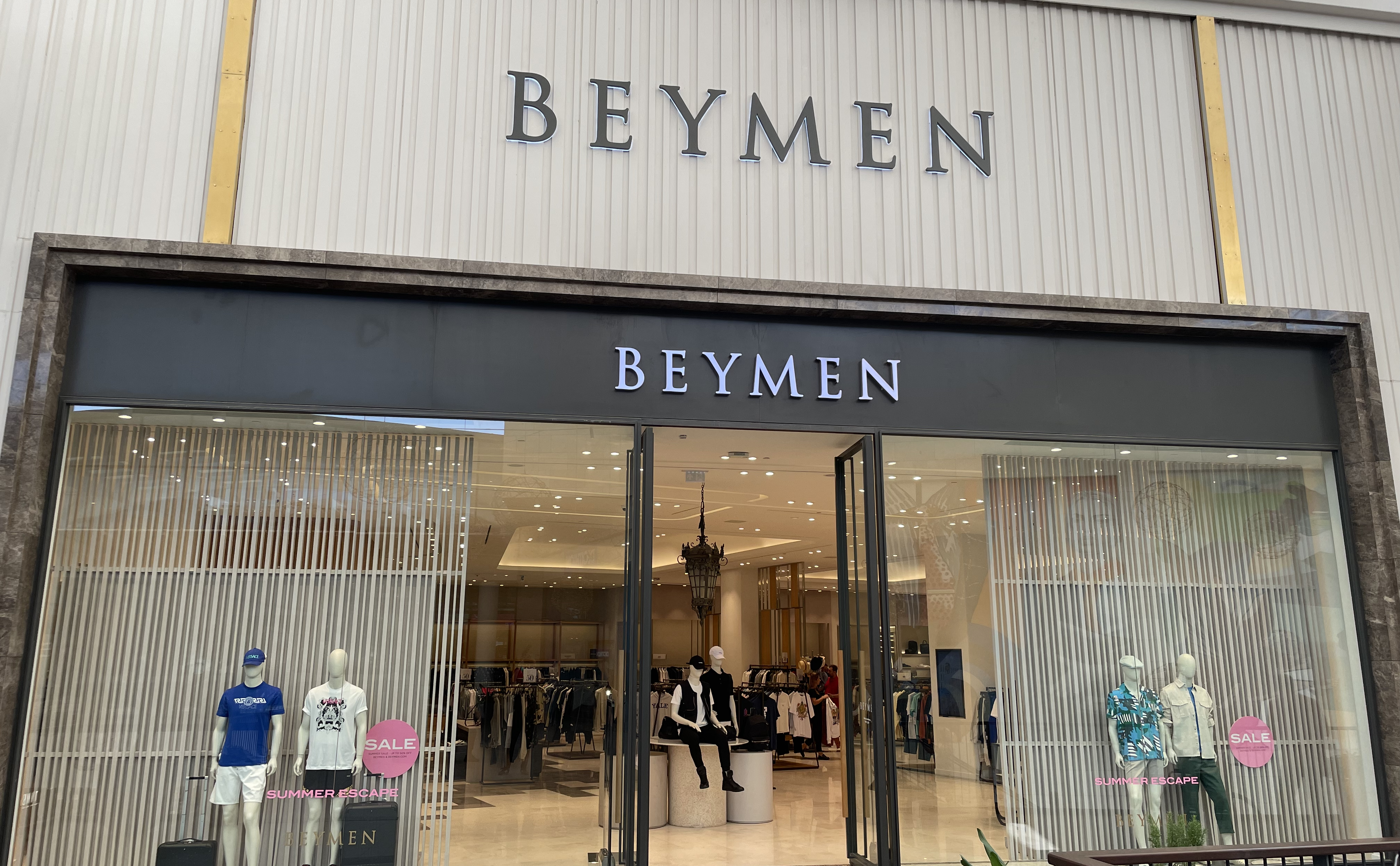
- Beymen Store in Hilltown Karşıyaka
- Industry: Fashion
- Founded: 1971; 55 years ago
- Founder: Osman Boyner
- Headquarters: Istanbul, Turkey
- Key people: Osman Boyner
- Products: Luxury goods
- Owner: Mayhoola for Investments

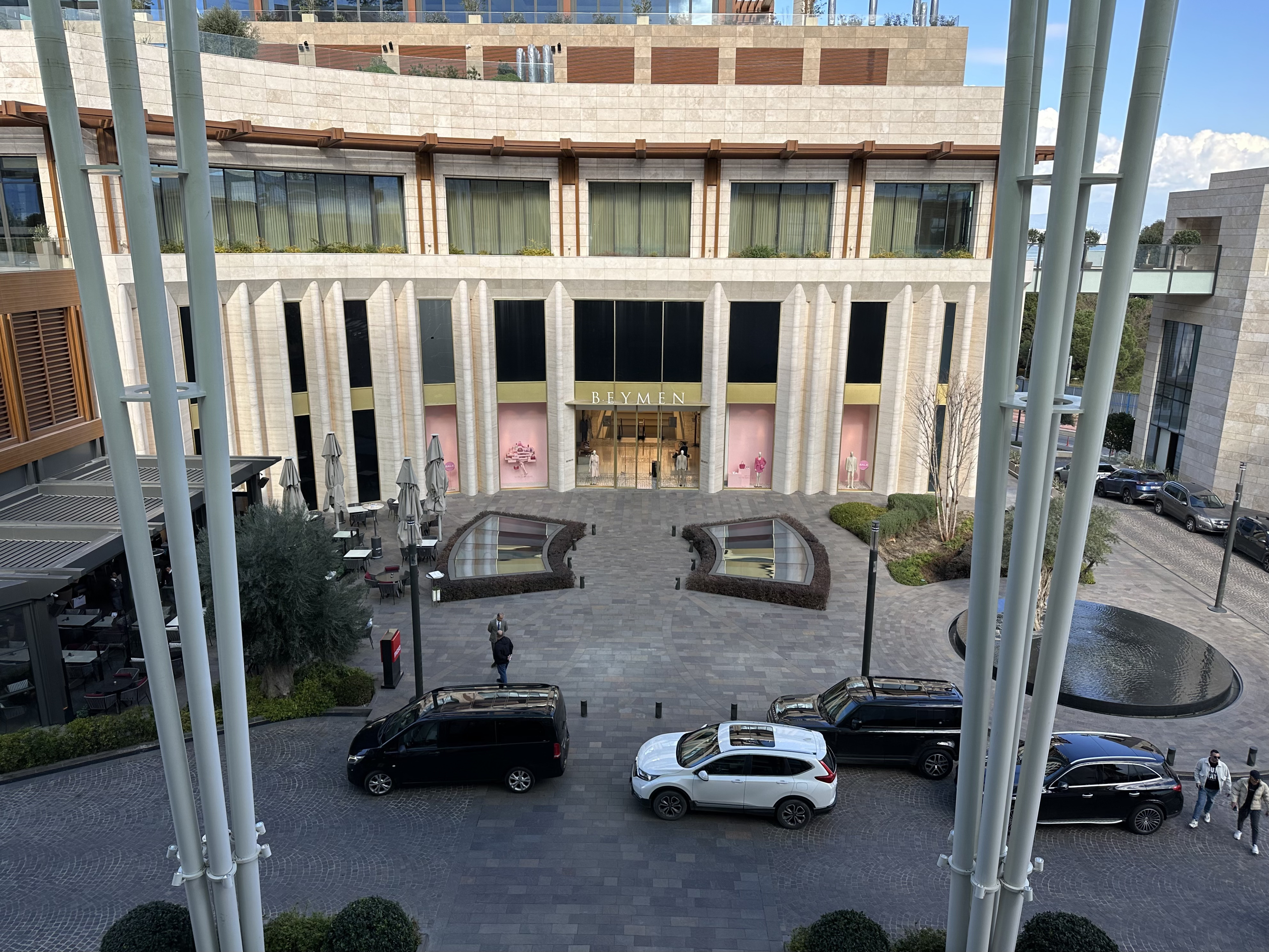
Beymen store in İstinyePark İzmir mall

Beymen is a chain of luxury department stores in Istanbul, Turkey, part of the Beymen Group owned by the Qatari investment fund Mayhoola for Investments.

Fodor's has compared the chain to Bloomingdale's in the United States, while London's Evening Standard has called Beymen Turkey's "answer to Selfridge's".

Beymen Group also operates the Beymen Classics, NetWork and Divarese chains of clothing boutiques. However, the separate Beymen Business operation is a chain of boutiques retailing private brand men's clothing under the Beymen Business brand, which it also manufactures. That business is not part of Beymen Group, but rather Boyner Group.

The company's headquarters is in Vadistanbul.

== History ==
Ali Osman Boyner co-founded Altınyıldız (today Boyner Holding) in 1952 with the idea to introduce Turkish fabric to the world. The company began exporting in 1956. At the end of the 1960s, Boyner began manufacturing ready-to-wear clothing to fill a gap in the Turkish market for quality goods. The upscale department store Beymen was conceived in collaboration with friend and fashion designer Kerim Kerimol and Italian fashion house owner Silvano Corsini. Beymen's first store, featuring its own private-label products, opened in 1971 in Şişli, Istanbul. From there, Beymen has continued to expand, owning a chain of 20 full-line department stores as of July 2024. A main competitor of Beymen is the upscale department store brand Vakko.

In 2016, supermodel Magdalena Frackowiak appeared in Beymen's advertising.

For its 50th anniversary in 2023, it held an exhibition, Golden opulence, "showcasing Istanbul’s lasting influence on high fashion".

== Products and services ==
Currently, the department stores sell high-quality house-brand ("Beymen") merchandise but also from global luxury brands including Valentino, Balmain, Dolce & Gabbana, Prada, Miu Miu, Etro, Balenciaga, Loewe, Isabel Marant, Bottega Veneta, Stella McCartney, Celine and Fendi.

Beymen's website also sells art, including works by İzzet Keribar ^{(tr)}.

== Corporate ==
In 2015, Qatari company Mayhoola acquired a 54% share of Boyner Retail and Textile Investments Inc., while Boyner Holding retained a share of 42.8%.

In 2019, Boyner Holding and Mayhoola agreed to dissolve their partnership, with Boyner Büyük Mağazacılık (department stores) and Altınyıldız Tekstil, the heritage businesses of the group, becoming part of Boyner Holding.

97% of Beymen Mağazacılık and Ay Marka Mağazacılık (boutiques) became part of Mayhoola, which thus added Turkey's largest luxury and fashion company to its global luxury portfolio, a portfolio including brands such as Valentino, Balmain and Pal Zileri.

=== Beymen Group ===
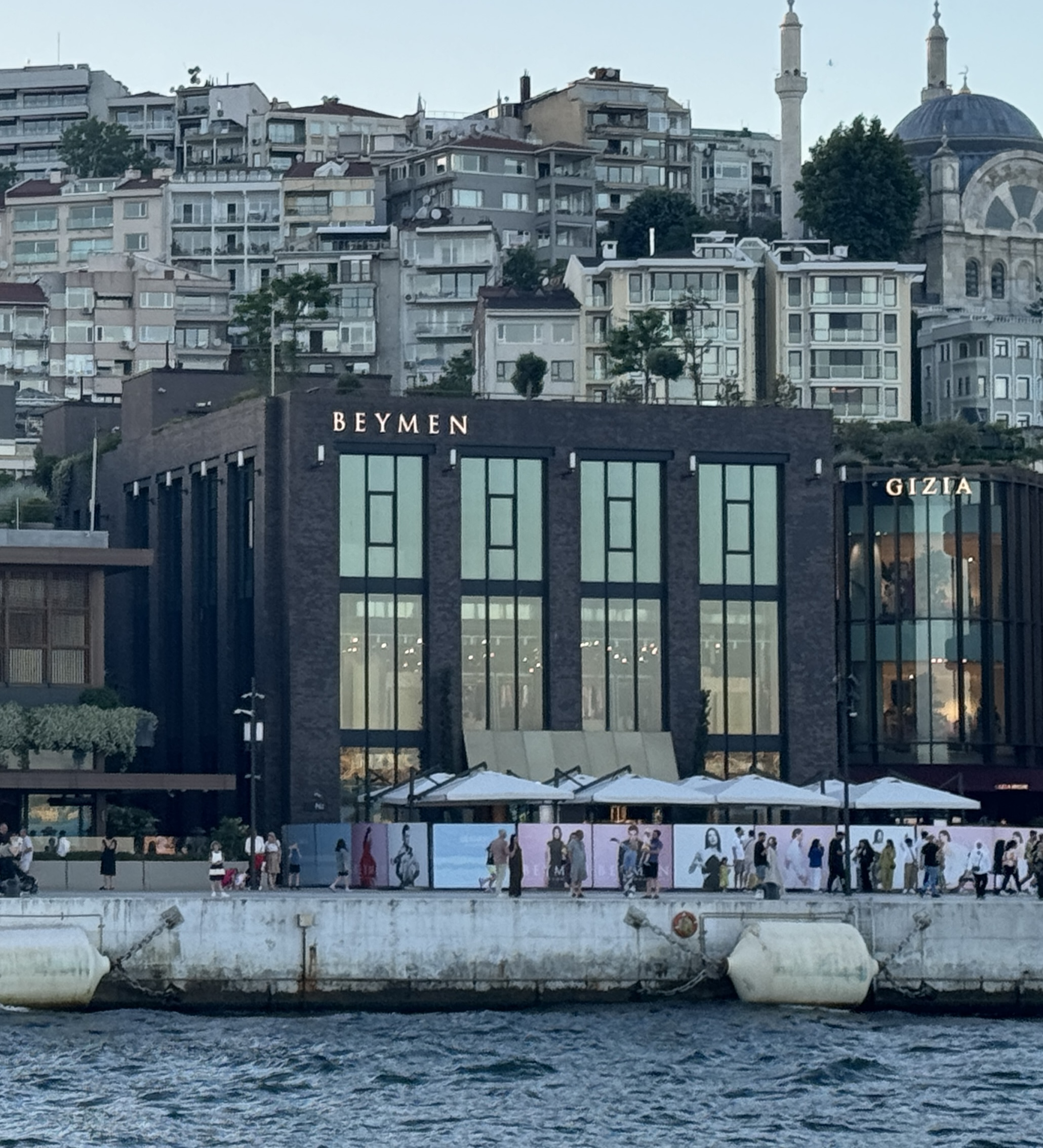
Beymen department store flagship at Galataport complex along the Bosphorus, Istanbul

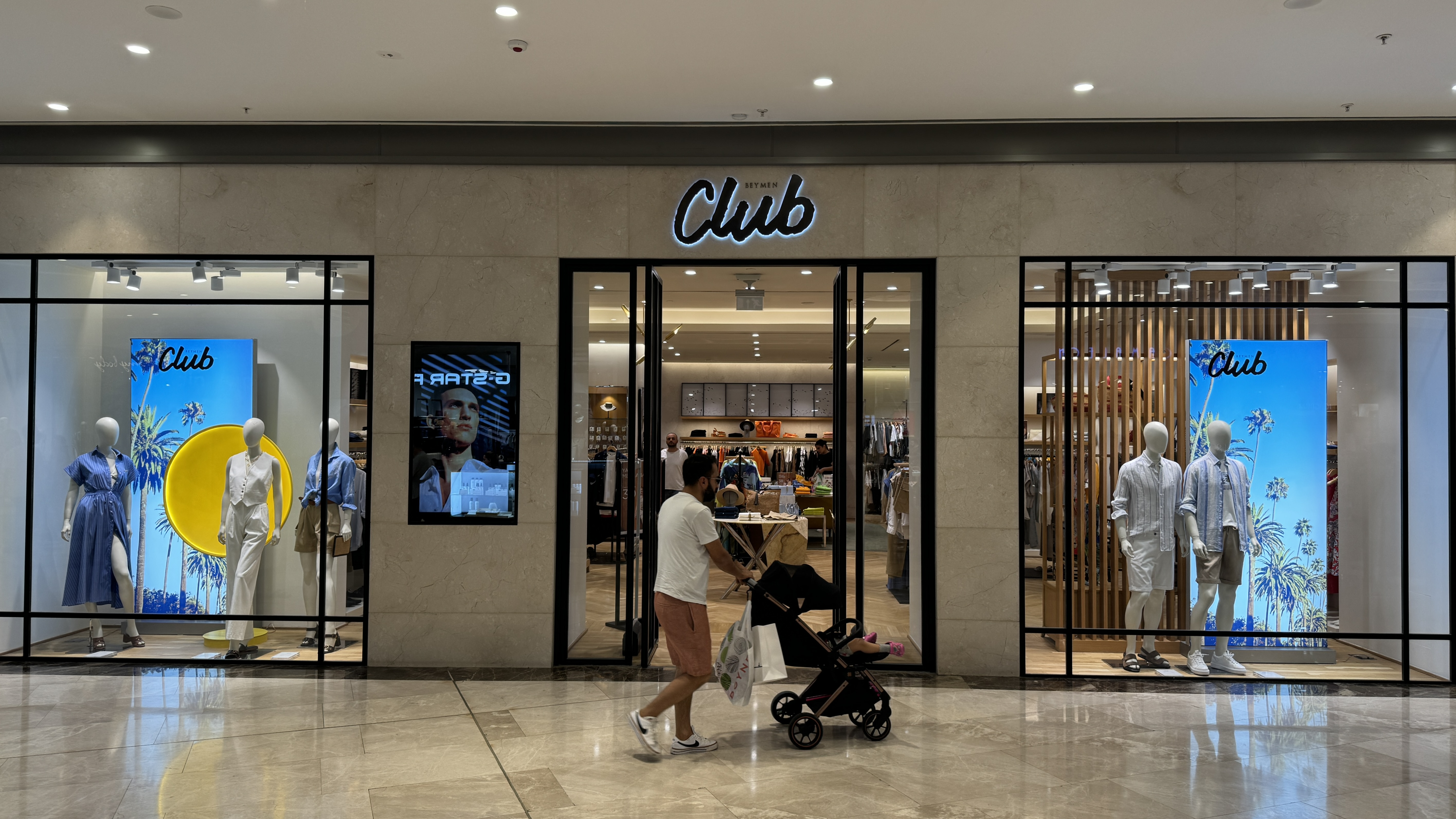
Beymen Club store in Vadistanbul shopping center

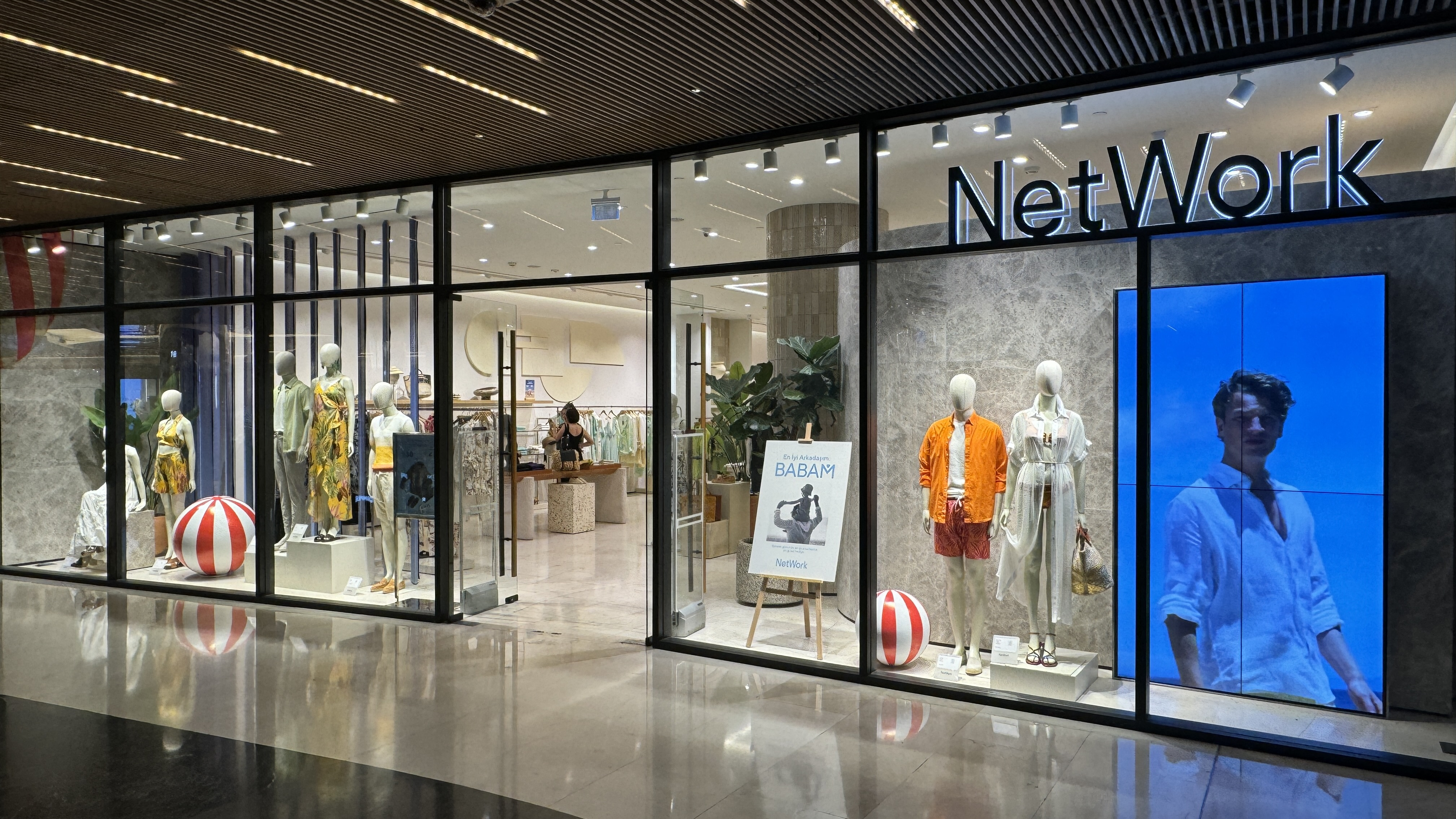
NetWork store in Zorlu Center in Istanbul, 2024

As of mid-2022, Beymen Group led by Cem Boyner operates a total of 91,000m^{2} of retail space across a total of 244 department and specialty stores. The four brands are:

- Beymen (full-line department store)
- Beymen Club men's clothing stores
- NetWork men's and women's clothing stores
- Divarese, with about 32 stores across Turkey

Beymen Business, on the other hand, is not part of Beymen Group, but rather operated by BR Mağazacılık of the Boyner Group.

=== Boyner Group ===
From 2019 onwards, Boyner Group has focused on five core businesses, as shown in the chart below. As of 2024, the Boyner Group brands are organized slightly differently than in 2019.

BR Mağazacılık manufactures and retails the brands Altınyıldız Classics and Beymen Business, created in 2011 as a joint venture of Boyner Group and Ran Konfesiyon. Headquartered in Torbalı, İzmir, and has around 2000 employees, 200 stores and more than 400 sales points in 60 provinces in Turkey as well as 60 stores in 18 other countries.

2019	2024
Boyner Büyük Mağazacılık (Boyner): multi-brand retail
Morhipo: fashion and multi-brand e-commerce	
Hopi: consumer technologies
Altınyıldız: textile production
Altınyıldız Classics: men's clothing manufacturing and retail	BR Mağazacılık (Altınyıldız Classics and Beymen Business manufacturing and retail)
	Boyner Yayınları: publishing
	Brooks Brothers

== Beymen stores ==
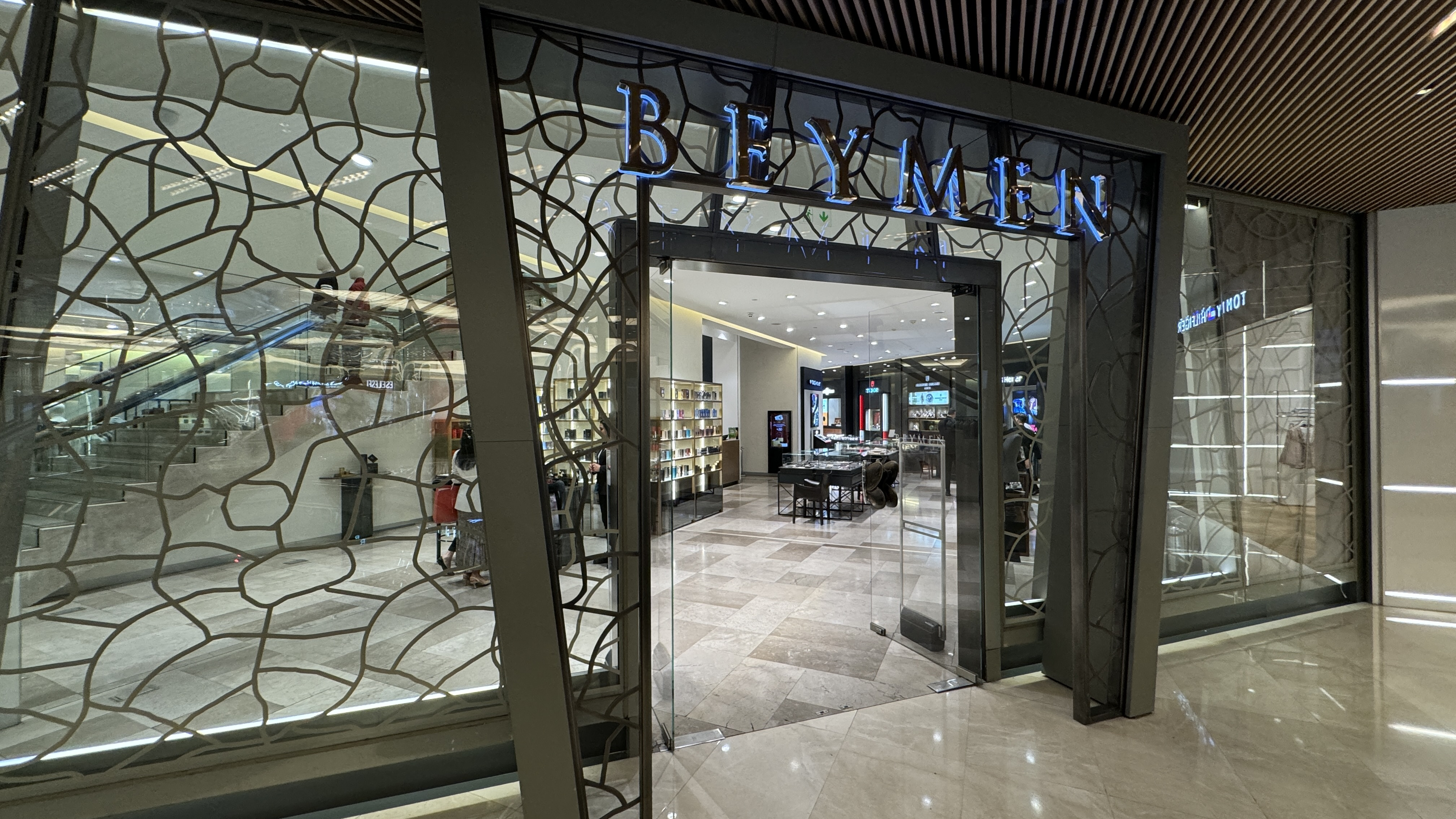
Beymen department store at Zorlu Center, Istanbul, 2024

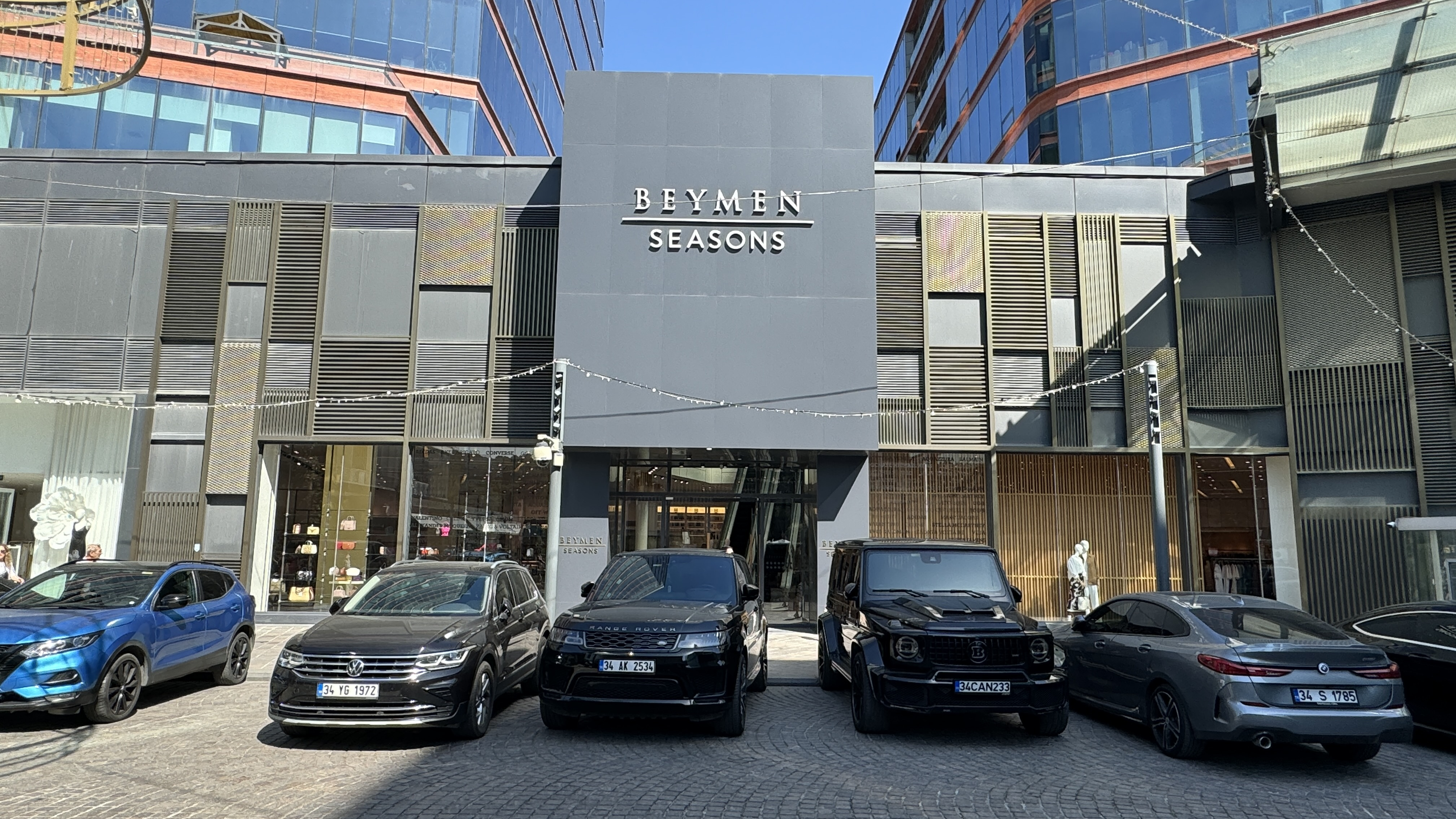
The "Beymen Seasons" department store at Vadistanbul, 2024

Originally 9,600 m^{2} upon opening in 2013, expanded in 2022 by another 1,750 m^{2}, Beymen Zorlu Center is the brand's largest department store location. 2,500 m^{2} is dedicated to shoes and bags. Designed by German/Swiss architects Michelgroup, who have done remodels for Munich's Oberpollinger department store It hosted the German artist Olaf Hajek's solo exhibition 'Best of Olaf Hajek'.

In 2022 Beymen opened a three-story, 3,000-sq-m store at Galataport, interiors by Catalan-Spanish designer Lazaro Rosa-Violán.

A second location along Bağdat Avenue in Erenköy, Kadıköy district closed as of 2024 The Suadıye location along Bağdat Avenue remains in operation.

The location in Vadistanbul opened in 2020 is branded Beymen Seasons and combines both the current season's fashions with previous seasons in one location.

Beymen operates department stores in the following locations: Michelgroup also designed the 2,000 m^{2} unit at Akasya mall in Üsküdar on the Asian side of Istanbul.

City/Region	District	Neighborhood	Mall	m^{2}	Opened	Remarks
Istanbul; CBD	Şişli	Harbiye (Nişantaşı)	Abdi İpekçi Avenue (freestanding)	3,500	2003	7 story flagship. Brasserie restaurant.
Istanbul; CBD	Beyoğlu	Karaköy	Galataport	3,000	2022	
Istanbul; CBD	Sarıyer	İstinye	İstinye Park			
Istanbul; CBD	Sarıyer	Ayazağa	Vadistanbul	4,000	2020	Branded "Beymen Seasons"
Istanbul; CBD	Beşiktaş	Levazım	Zorlu Center	11,300	2013	
Istanbul– Western	Bakırköy	Şenlikköy	Aqua Florya			
Istanbul– Western	Bakırköy	Ataköy	Ataköy Plus (A Plus)		May 20, 2022	
Istanbul– Western	Bahçelievler	Merkez	Starcity			Outlet store
Istanbul– Asia	Üsküdar	Acıbadem	Akasya		2021	
Istanbul– Asia	Kadıköy	Suadiye	Bağdat Avenue (freestanding)		August 9, 2017	
Istanbul– Asia	Ataşehir	Ertuğrul	Metropol İstanbul	1,210	2019	
Istanbul– Asia	Ataşehir	Yeni Sahra	Optimum			Outlet store
Istanbul– Asia	Pendik	Yenişehir	Viaport		2016	Outlet store
Adana	Seyhan	Ahmet Remzi Yüreğir	01 Burda			
Ankara	Söğütözü		Armada		May 20, 2022	
Ankara	Kavaklidere		Tahran Avenue (freestanding)			
Ankara	Oran		Panora		May 20, 2022	
Antalya	Muratpaşa	Şirinyalı	(freestanding)			
Antalya	Serik	Kadriye	Rixos - Land of Legends Shopping Avenue			
Bodrum area	Bodrum	Göltürkbükü	Resort Mandarin			
Bodrum area	Bodrum		Yalıkavak Marina			
Bursa	Osmangazi̇		Korupark		May 20, 2022	
Gaziantep	Şehitkamil	Sarıgüllük	Sanko Park			
İzmir	Karşıyaka	Yalı	Hilltown Karşıyaka	1,500	2021	Replaced Karşıyaka store
İzmir	Balçova	Bahçelerarası	İstinyePark İzmir	4,000+	2021	3rd largest store upon opening, 2 stories. Replaced Konak Pier store.
Mersin		Eğriçam Mah.	Mersin Marina		May 20, 2022	

Former stores: Erenköy (in Suadiye, Kadıköy), Akmerkez
