= Akasya =

Akasya Acıbadem
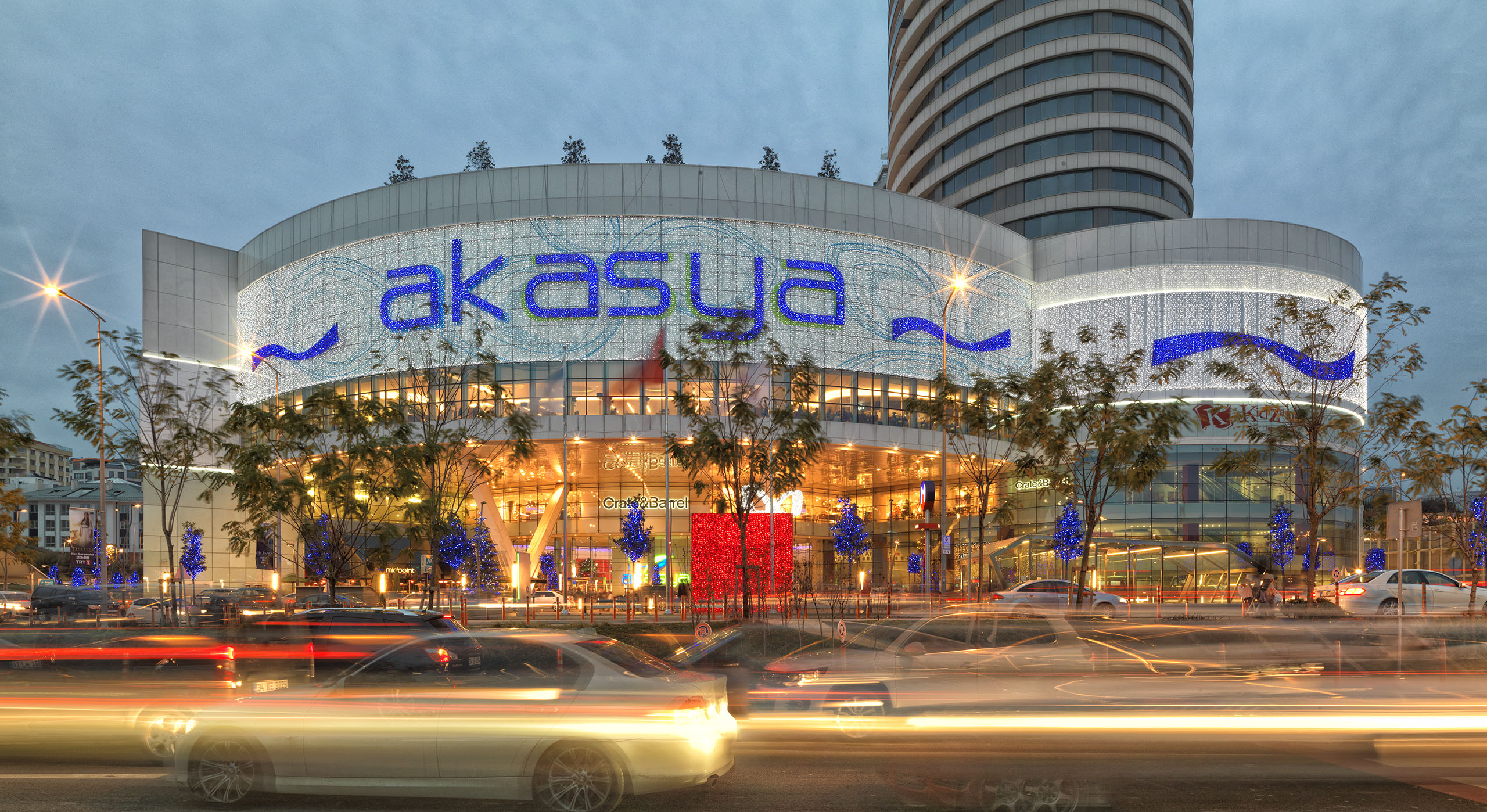
- Location: Acıbadem, Istanbul, Turkey
- Coordinates: 41°00′05″N 29°03′17″E
- Opened: March 2014; 12 years ago
- Developer: Akkök
- Num. of stores: 250
- Floor area: 80,000 m^{2} (860,000 sq ft) (total enclosed area)
- Website: www.ak-asya.com.tr

Akasya is a shopping mall and mixed-use development in Üsküdar, Istanbul, Turkey. The mall has a gross leasable area of 80,000 sqm and was developed on the site of a former car factory by SAF REIT in Acıbadem, a participation of Akiş REIT. The complex contains 1,357 residences as well as the shopping center, with around 250 stores including a hypermarket. The mall opened on March 6, 2014. Stores include department stores Beymen, Boyner and Vakkorama.

== Gallery ==
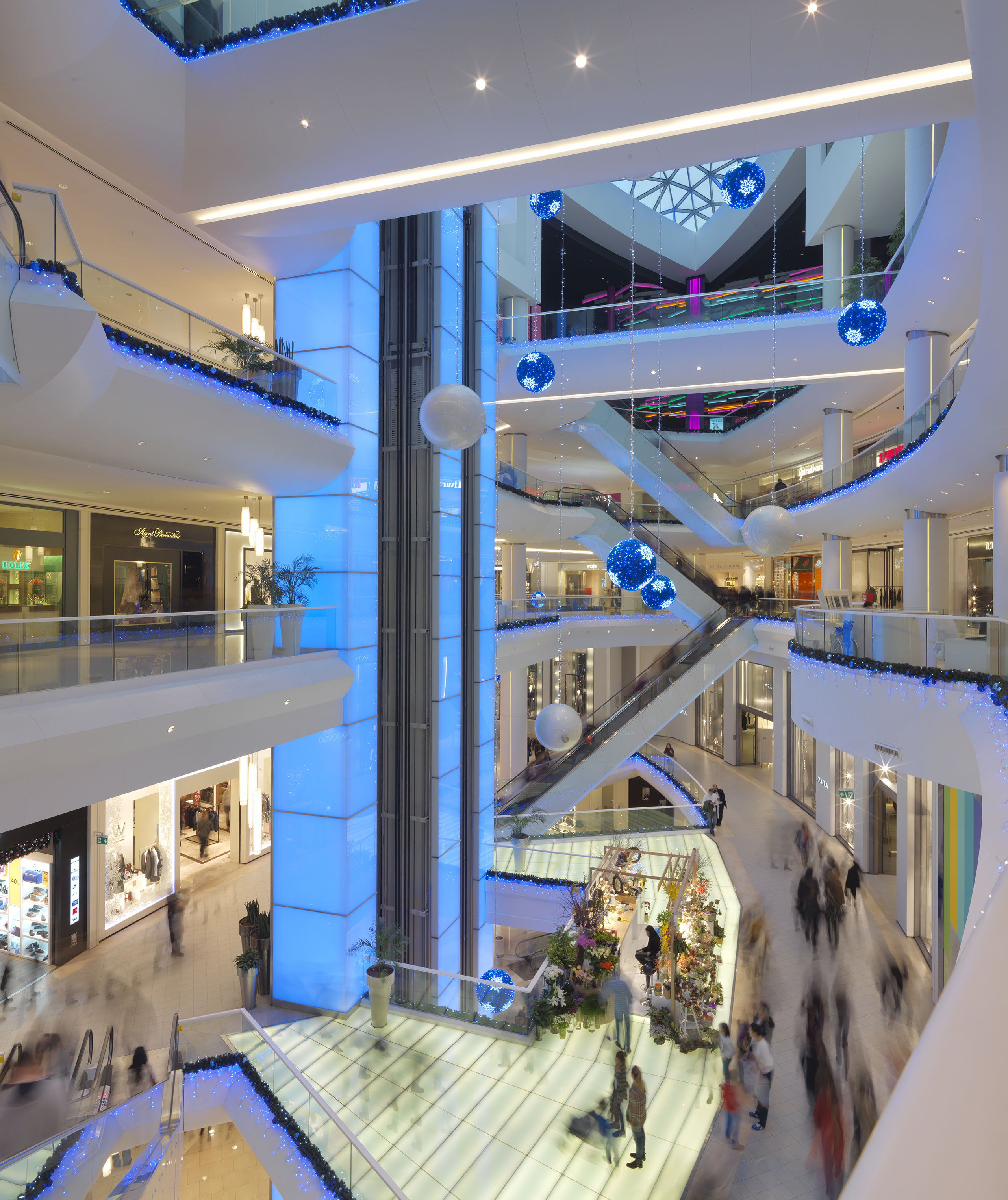

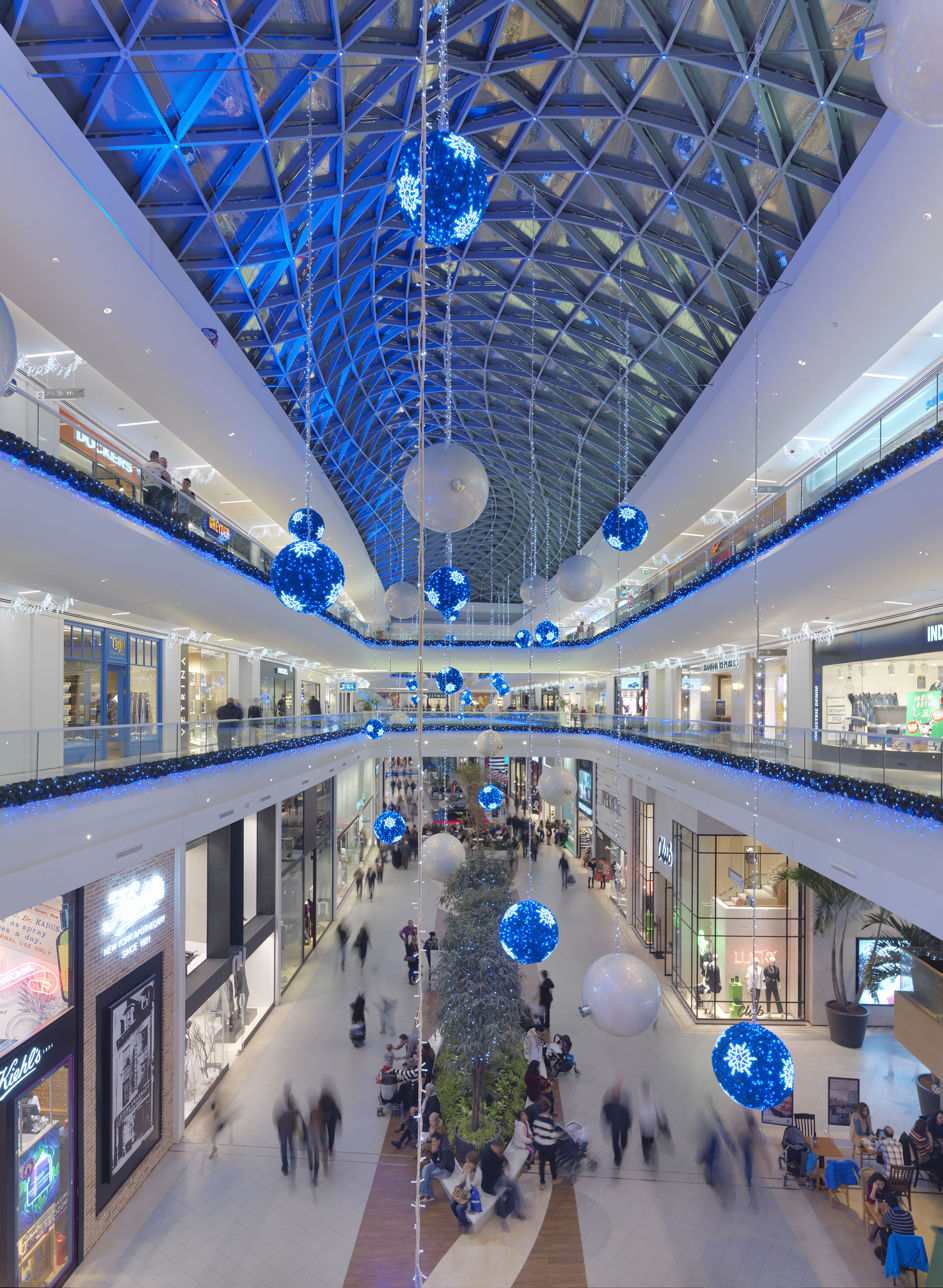

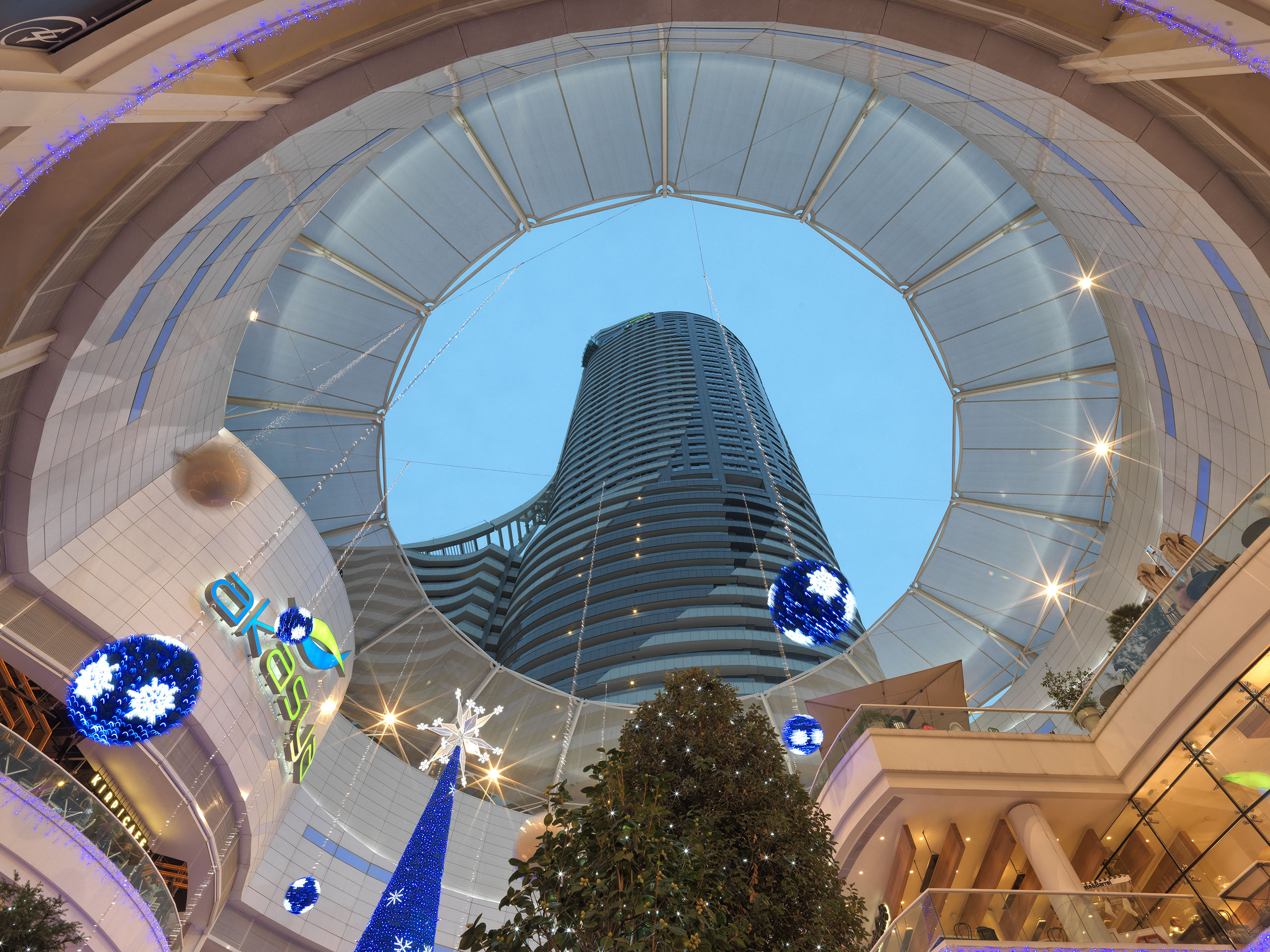

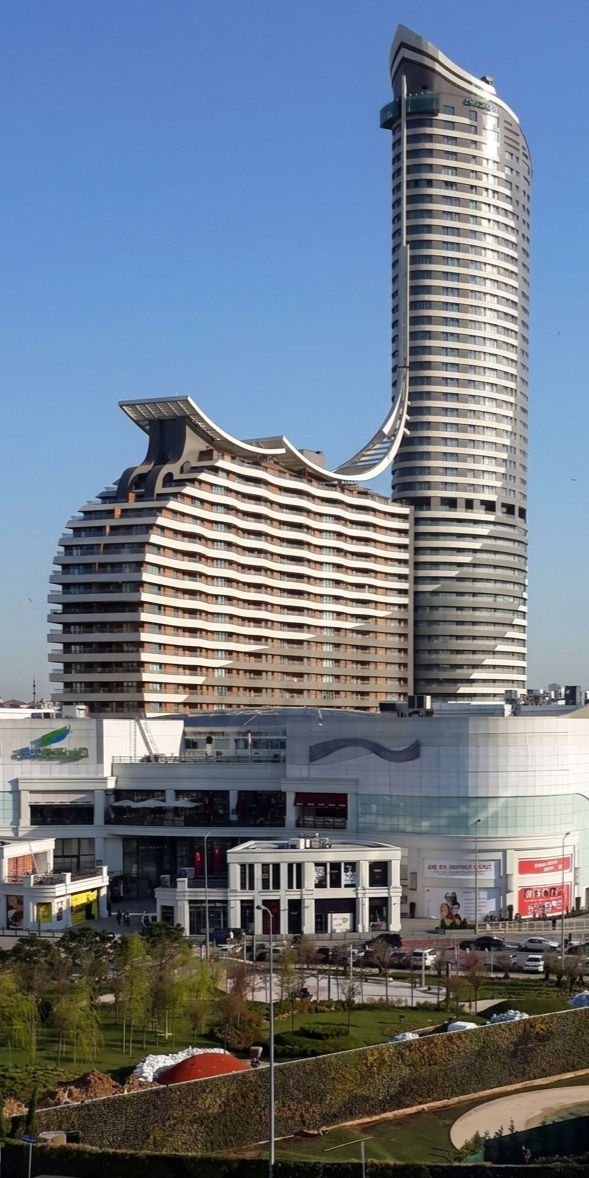
