= Vadistanbul station =

Metro station in Istanbul, Turkey

Vadistanbul
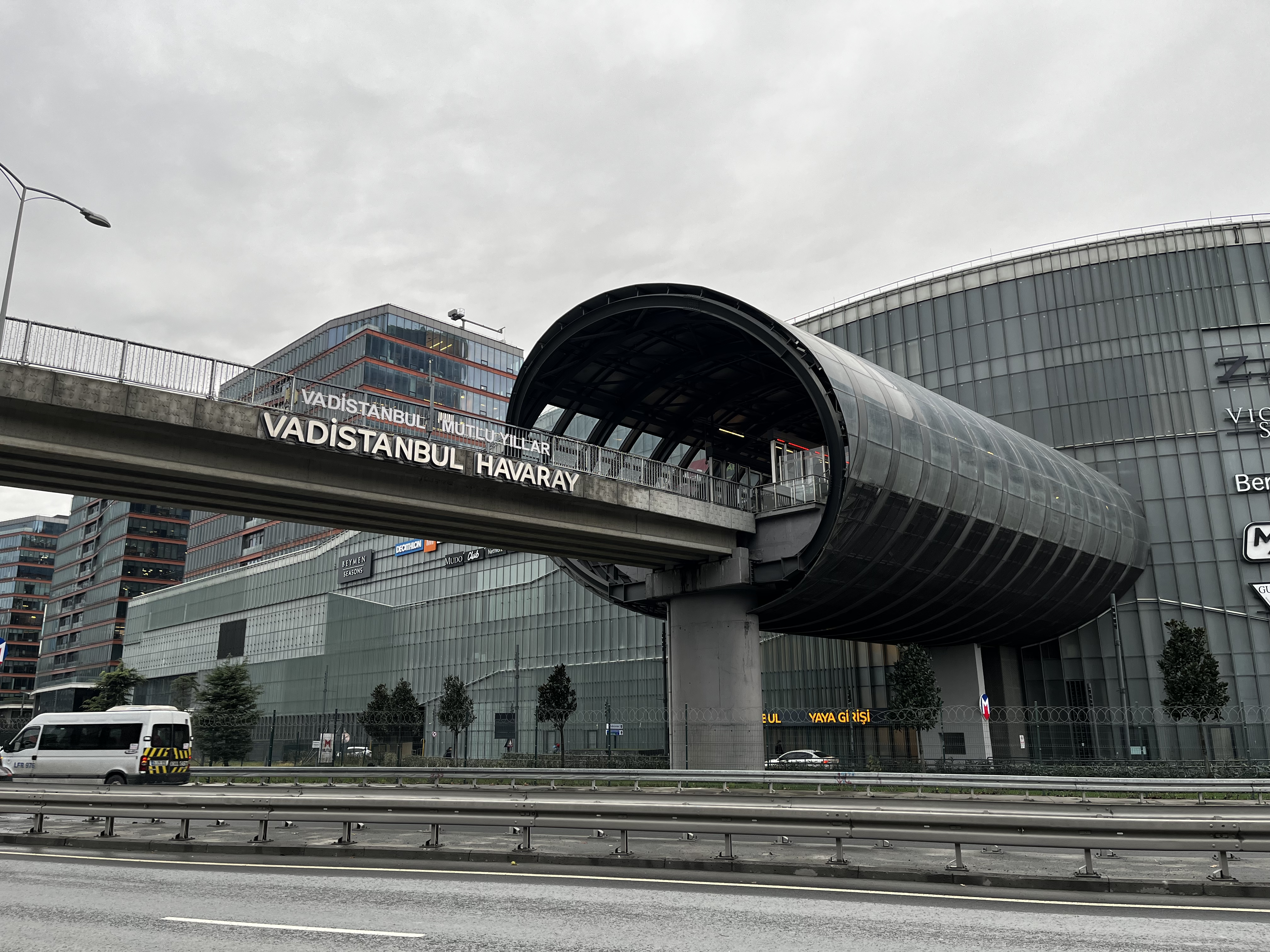

General information
- Location: Vadistanbul AVM, Cendere Cd., Ayazağa Mah., 34396; Sarıyer, Istanbul
- Coordinates: 41.0626°N 28.5918°E
- Owner: Istanbul Metropolitan Municipality
- Operator: Metro Istanbul
- Line: F3
- Platforms: 1 bay platform
- Tracks: 1
- Connections: İETT Bus: 50D, 62H; Istanbul Minibus: Zincirlikuyu-Vadistanbul

Construction
- Structure type: Elevated
- Parking: Located within Vadistanbul
- Accessible: Yes

History
- Opened: 29 October 2017

Services
Preceding station	Istanbul Metro	Following station
Terminus	F3	Seyrantepe Terminus
Location

Vadistanbul is an elevated station and the western terminus of the F3 funicular line of the Istanbul Metro. The station consists of a bay platform with one track inside a Spheroid glass structure within the Vadistanbul Shopping Center. The station is the first and only rapid transit station in Turkey to be directly connected to a privately owned structure. Trains operate to Seyrantepe in seven minute intervals daily between 8:00 and 22:00.

Vadistanbul station connects to the 2nd floor of the Vadistanbul shopping center near the food court and was opened on 29 October 2017.
