= F3 (Istanbul funicular) =

Coordinates: 41.0618°N 28.5928°E

F3 Vadistanbul–Seyrantepe

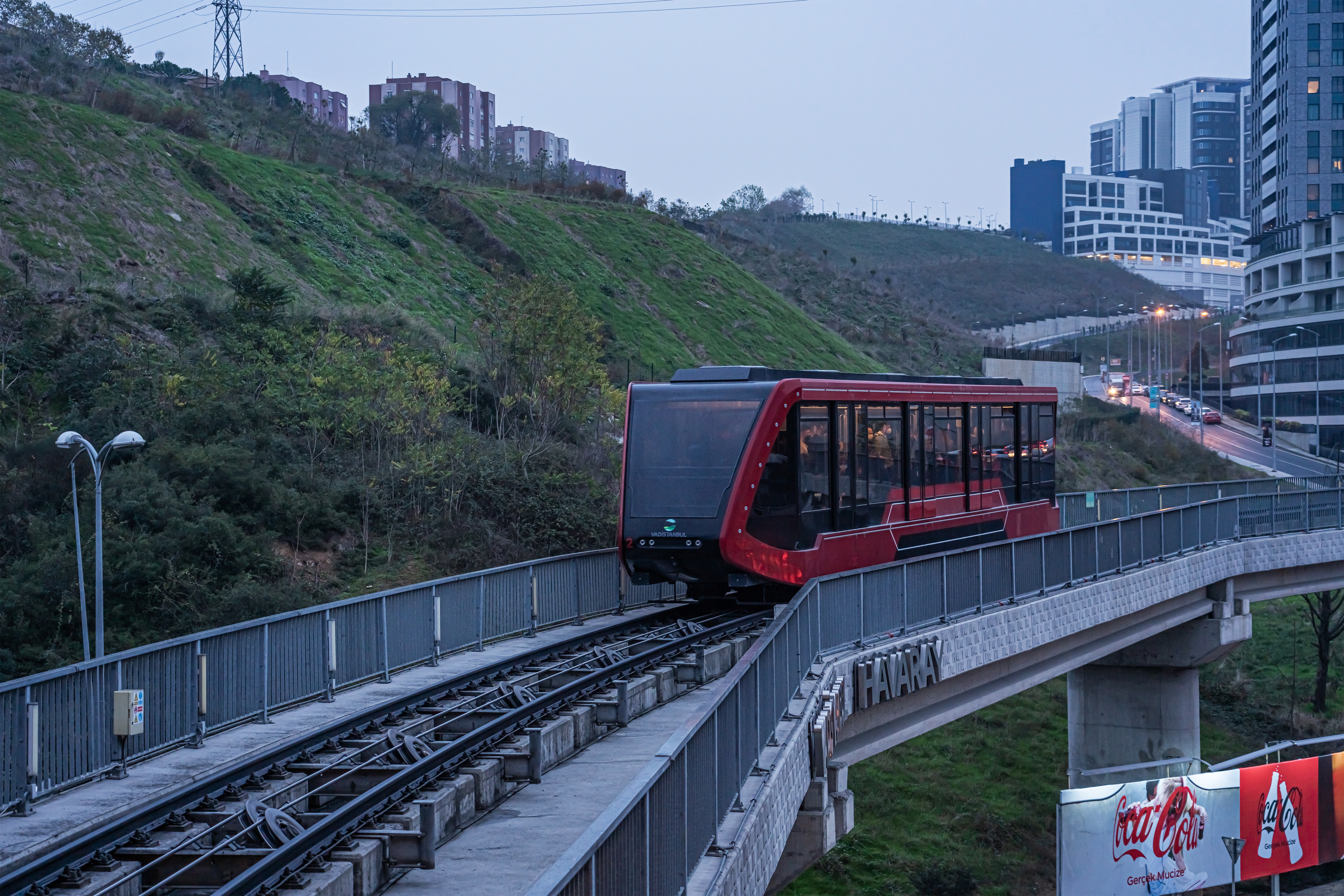

Overview
- Status: Operating
- Owner: Vadistanbul AVM
- Locale: Istanbul, Turkey
- Termini: Vadistanbul station, Sarıyer; Seyrantepe station, Sarıyer
- Stations: 2

Service
- Type: Funicular
- System: Istanbul Metro
- Route number: F3
- Operator: İETT

History
- Opened: 29 October 2017; 8 years ago

Technical
- Line length: 0.75 km (0.47 mi)
- Number of tracks: 1 (with a passing loop)
- Track gauge: 1,435 mm (4 ft 8 1/2 in) standard gauge
- Operating speed: 28.8 km/h (17.9 mph)

The F3, also known as the Vadistanbul Skyrail (Turkish: Vadistanbul Havaray) and officially referred to as the F3 Vadistanbul-Seyrantepe funicular line (Turkish: F3 Vadistanbul-Seyrantepe füniküler hattı), is a 750 m (2,460 ft) long funicular railway in Sarıyer, Istanbul. The line is one of four funicular railways in Turkey, all of them in Istanbul, and is the only one that operates above ground. Because the F3 runs on top a concrete viaduct, it has been falsely commented as a Monorail even though it is technically a funicular railway on a standard gauge rail track. The route runs between Vadistanbul and Seyrantepe, where connection to the M2 line is available.

The F3 was opened on 29 October 2017.

== Overview ==
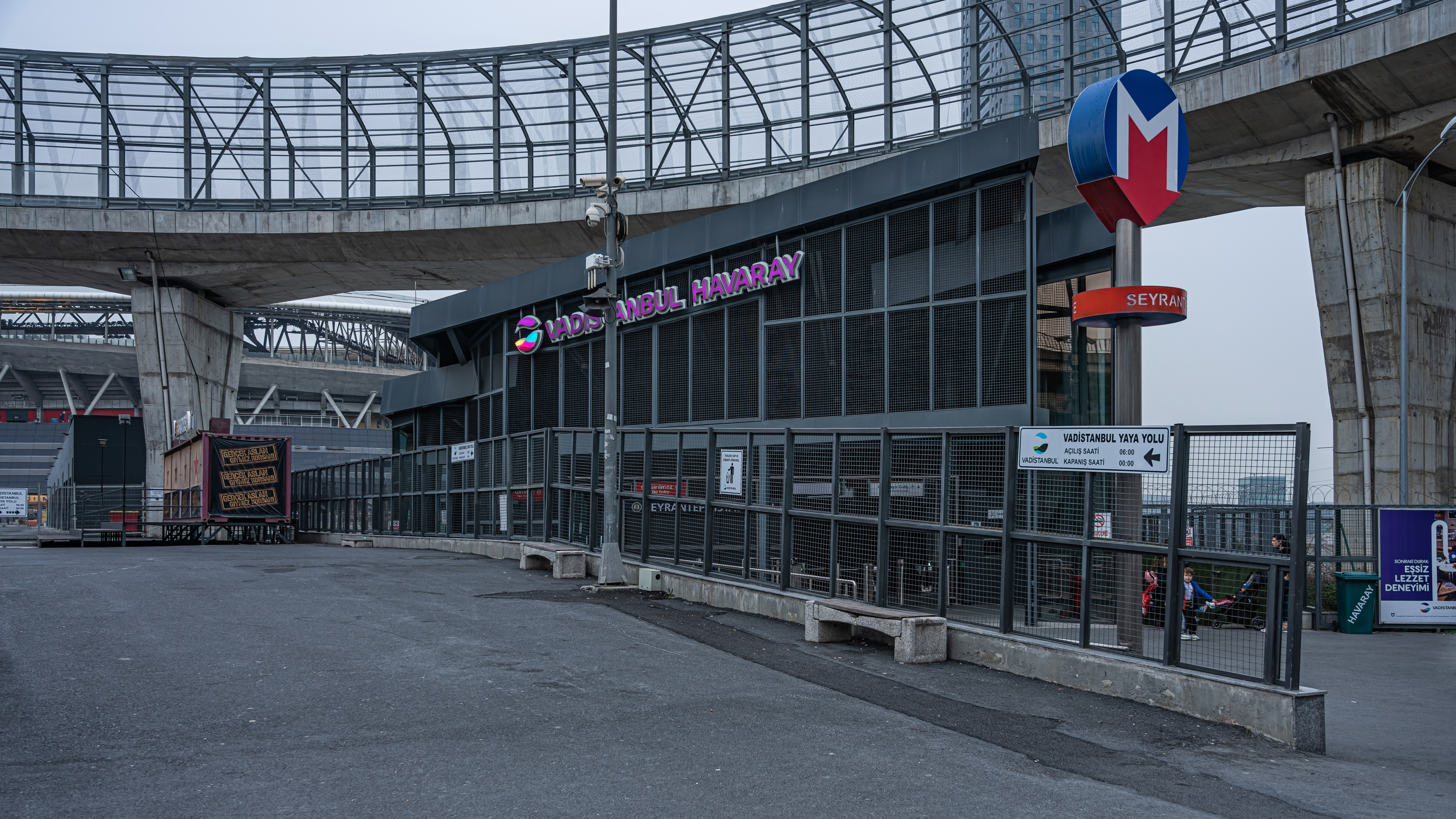
Seyrantepe entrance

The F3 route runs in southern Sarıyer, just west of Maslak. The large majority of the route is elevated with a concrete viaduct and consists of two stations. The northwest terminus of the F3, Vadistanbul station, is located within a glass Spheroid structure that connects to the 2nd floor of the Vadistanbul Shopping Center. The southeast terminus, Seyrantepe station, is located underground on the northern side of the O-2 expressway. A tunnel underneath the expressway connects to the M2 station. The route is mostly single track, except for a short 147 m (482 ft) long passing loop in the middle allowing both trains to pass one another. The total construction cost of the line was €15 million.

== Line ==
No	Station	District	Transfer	Type	Notes
1	Seyrantepe	Sarıyer	(Seyrantepe); İETT Bus: 27SE, 41SM, 41ST, 62H, 65A	Viaduct	Rams Park
2	Vadistanbul	Sarıyer	İETT Bus: 50D, 50H, 62H	Viaduct	Vadistanbul Shopping Center
