= Boyner =

Turkish apparel manufacturer and retailer

Boyner Group (Boyner Holding A.Ş.)
- Logo of Boyner Group (Boyner Holding)

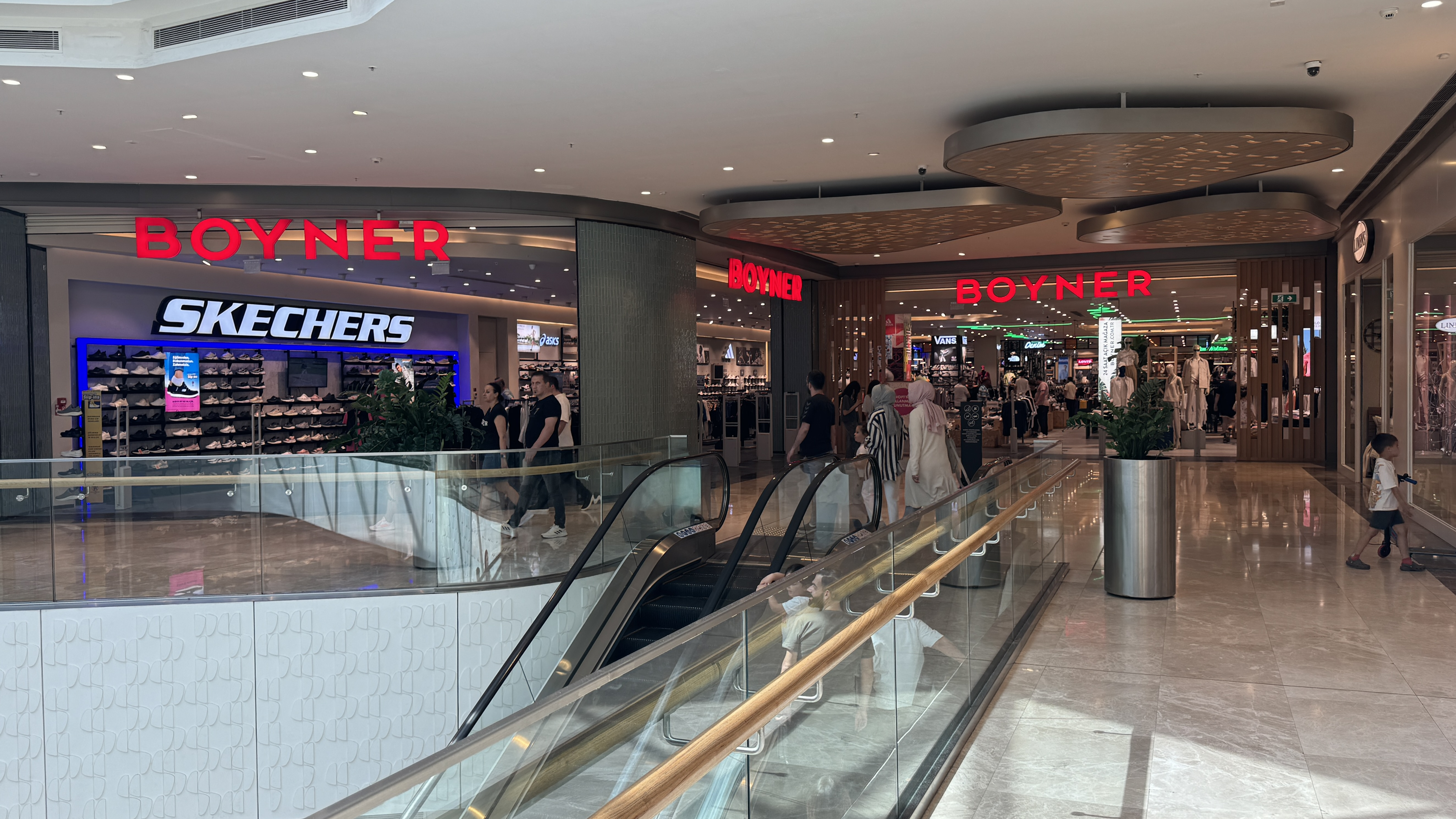
- Boyner department store at Vadistanbul shopping center
- Native name: Boyner Grup (Boyner Holding A.Ş.)
- Formerly: Çarşı
- Company type: S.A. (corporation)
- Traded as: BİST: BOYNR
- Industry: Retailing and manufacturing of apparel
- Founded: 1981 (as Çarşı)
- Founder: Osman Boyner
- Headquarters: USO Center Building, Maslak, Sarıyer, Istanbul, Turkey
- Number of locations: about 360 (department stores, boutiques and cafés)
- Area served: Turkey (Brooks Brothers also Algeria, Cyprus ("TRNC"), Egypt, Libya, Morocco, Tunisia)
- Key people: Cem Boyner (Chairman); Eren Çamurdan (CEO)
- Products: Clothing, home textiles, accessories
- Brands: Boyner, Boyner Active, Boyner Dynamic, Boyner Outlet, Factory, YKM, Costa Coffee, Altınyıldız Classics, Beymen Business, Brooks Brothers
- Revenue: ▲ ₺ 660.147 million (2011)
- Operating income: ▲ ₺ 39.403 million (2011)
- Net income: ▲ ₺ 23.854 million (2011)
- Total assets: ▲ ₺ 323.023 million (2011)
- Total equity: ▲ ₺ 100.017 million (2011)
- Number of employees: 5,200
- Divisions: Boyner Büyük Mağazacılık A.Ş.; BR Mağazacılık; BB Perakende (Brooks Brothers franchise); Altınyıldız; Boyner Yarınları
- Website: www.boynergrup.com/en/about-us

Boyner Group is one of two major groups, alongside Beymen Group, that grew out of Osman Boyner's textile and clothing manufacturing and retailing enterprises. "Boyner" is also the name of the Boyner Group division Boyner Büyük Mağazacılık, which operates the Boyner department store chain.

== History ==
Ali Osman Boyner co-founded Altınyıldız (Boyner Holding today) in 1952 with the idea to introduce Turkish fabric to the world and started exporting in 1956. At the end of the 1960s, Boyner began manufacturing ready-to-wear clothing to fill a gap in the Turkish market for quality goods. After long research, he planted the first seeds of the upscale department store Beymen, collaborating with friend and fashion designer Kerim Kerimol and Italian fashion house owner Silvano Corsini. Beymen's first store, featuring its private-label products, opened in 1971 in Şişli, Istanbul. From there, Beymen continued to open new stores and compete with Vakko in the upscale department store business.

Boyner Group thus focused from 2019 on five businesses, as shown in the table below. As of 2024 the Boyner Group brands are organized slightly differently than in 2019.

== Divisions ==
The retail store divisions include Boyner Büyük Mağazacılık (7 store formats), BR Mağazacılık (2 formats), and Brooks Brothers stores in Turkey and some other countries.

=== Boyner Büyük Mağazacılık ===
The Boyner Büyük Mağazacılık A.Ş. (or simply "Boyner") as of May 2024, operates:

- 74 Boyner department stores
- 9 Boyner Active boutiques
- 3 Boyner Dynamic boutiques
- 22 Boyner Outlet stores
- 1 Fabrika boutique in Ankamall, Ankara
- 3 YKM boutiques
- 7 Costa Coffee cafés in Turkey

In 2013, it had 78 Boyner and many more YKM (Yeni Karamürsel) stores (61 in total) in 37 provinces of Turkey and employed around 5,200 people.

Deran Taşkıran became general manager of Boyner in May 2014, replacing Aslı Karadeniz, another female executive.

As of February 2019, Eren Çamurdan is the new CEO of Boyner Büyük Mağazacılık A.Ş.

The company is a member of the International Association of Department Stores since 2023.

=== BR Mağazacılık ===
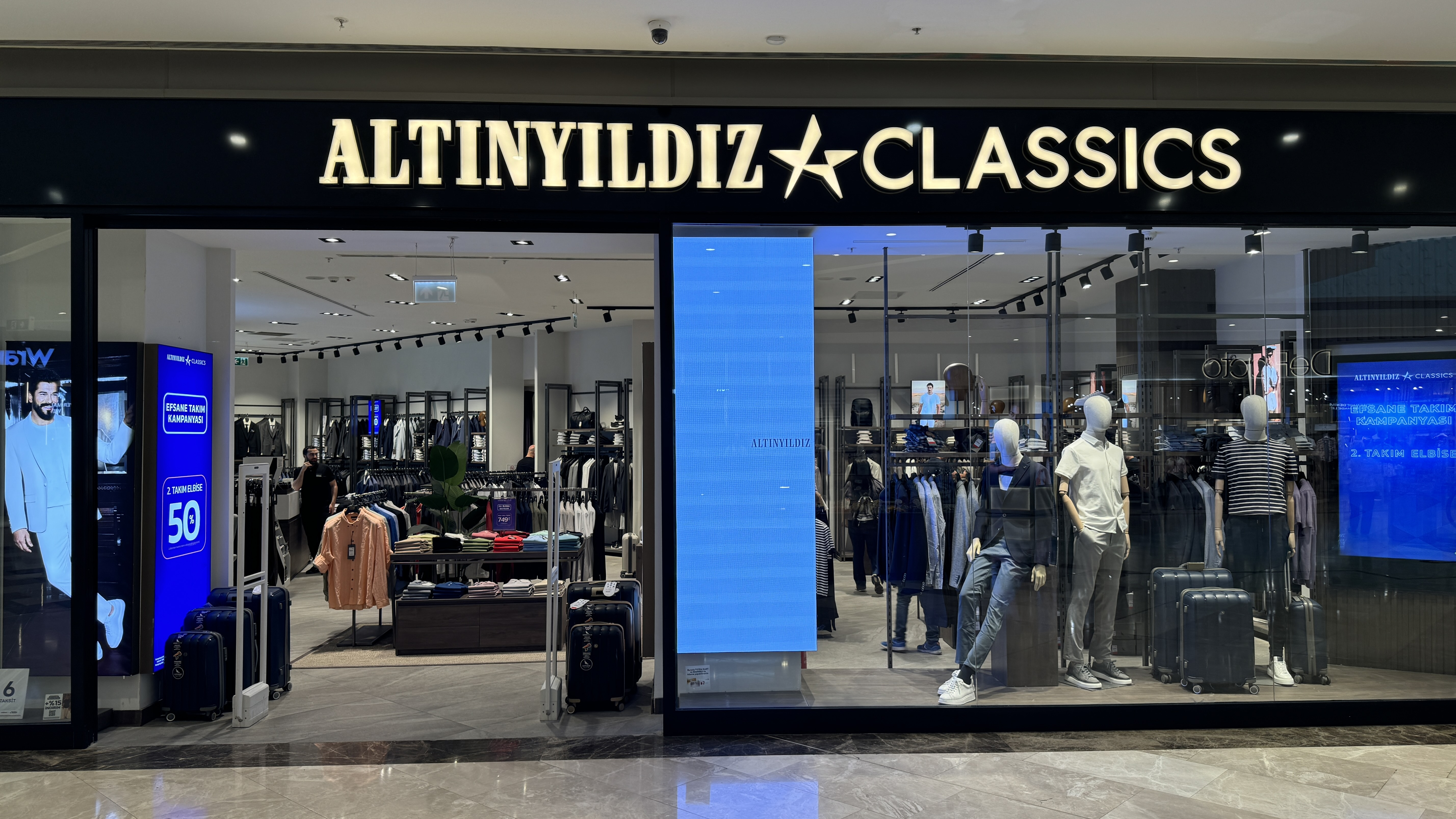
Altinyildiz Classics store at Vadistanbul shopping center

BR Mağazacılık manufactures and retails the brands Altınyıldız Classics and Beymen Business, i.e., unlike other brands with "Beymen" in the name, Beymen Business is not part of the Beymen Group. Boyner Group established BR Mağazacılık in 2011 as a joint venture with Ran Konfesiyon. Its headquarters are in Torbalı, İzmir, and it has around 2000 employees, 200 stores and more than 400 sales points in 60 of Turkey's 81 provinces, as well as 60 stores in 18 other countries.

=== BB Perakende (Brooks Brothers licensee) ===
BB Perakende Mağazacılık Sanayi Tic. A.Ş. is the licensee of the Brooks Brothers brand with, as of May 2024, 24 Brooks Brothers stores and about 60 total points of sales in Turkey, Northern Cyprus, Algeria, Egypt, Libya, Morocco and Tunisia.

=== Businesses no longer part of Boyner Group ===
In 2019, as mentioned previously, the remaining retail businesses from the Boyner Group were put into the Beymen Group led by Cem Boyner, which markets the brands and retail stores Beymen (private label brand and full line department store), Beymen Classics men's brand and stores; NetWork and Divarese.

== Gallery ==
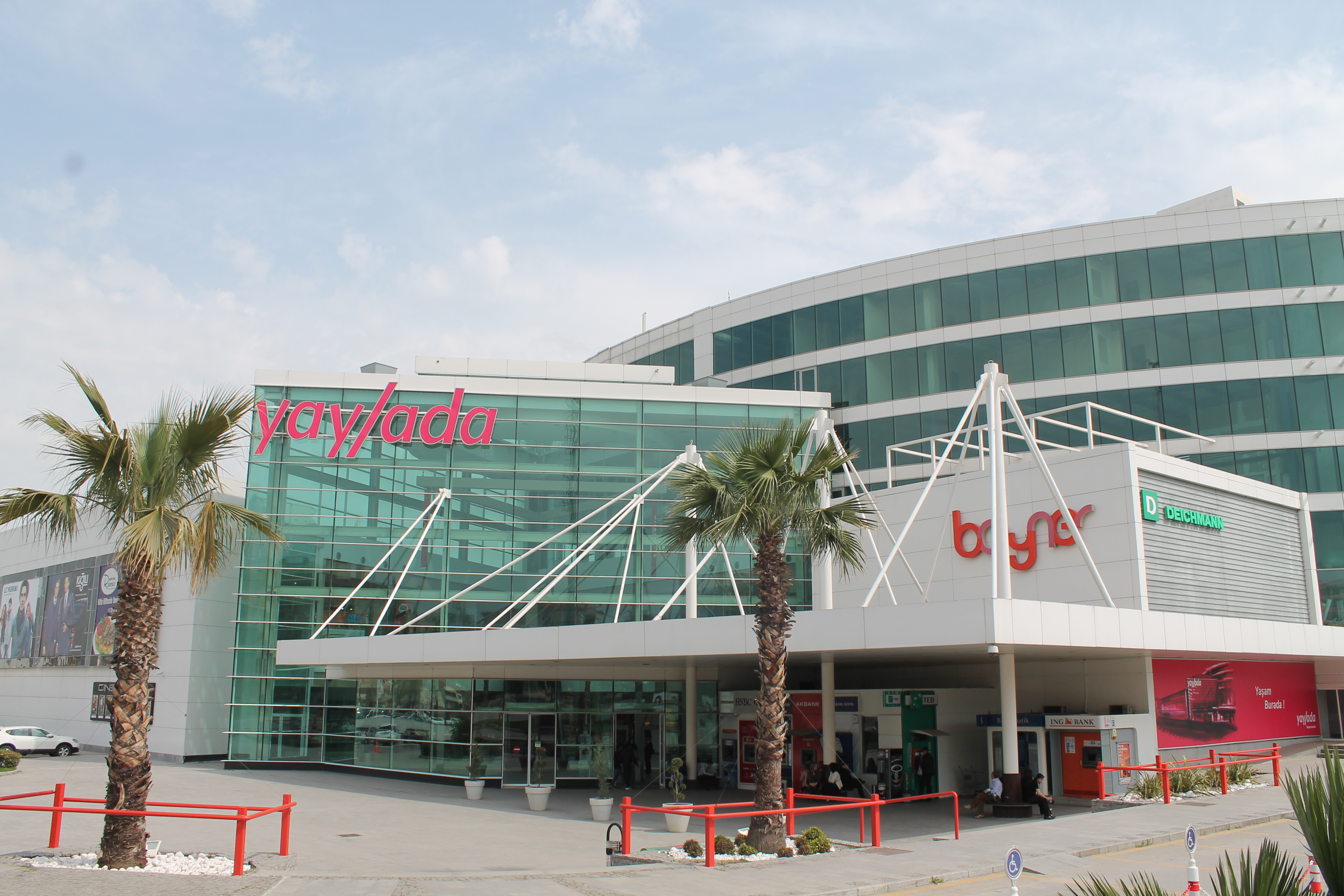
Boyner department store at Yaylada mall, Balıkesir

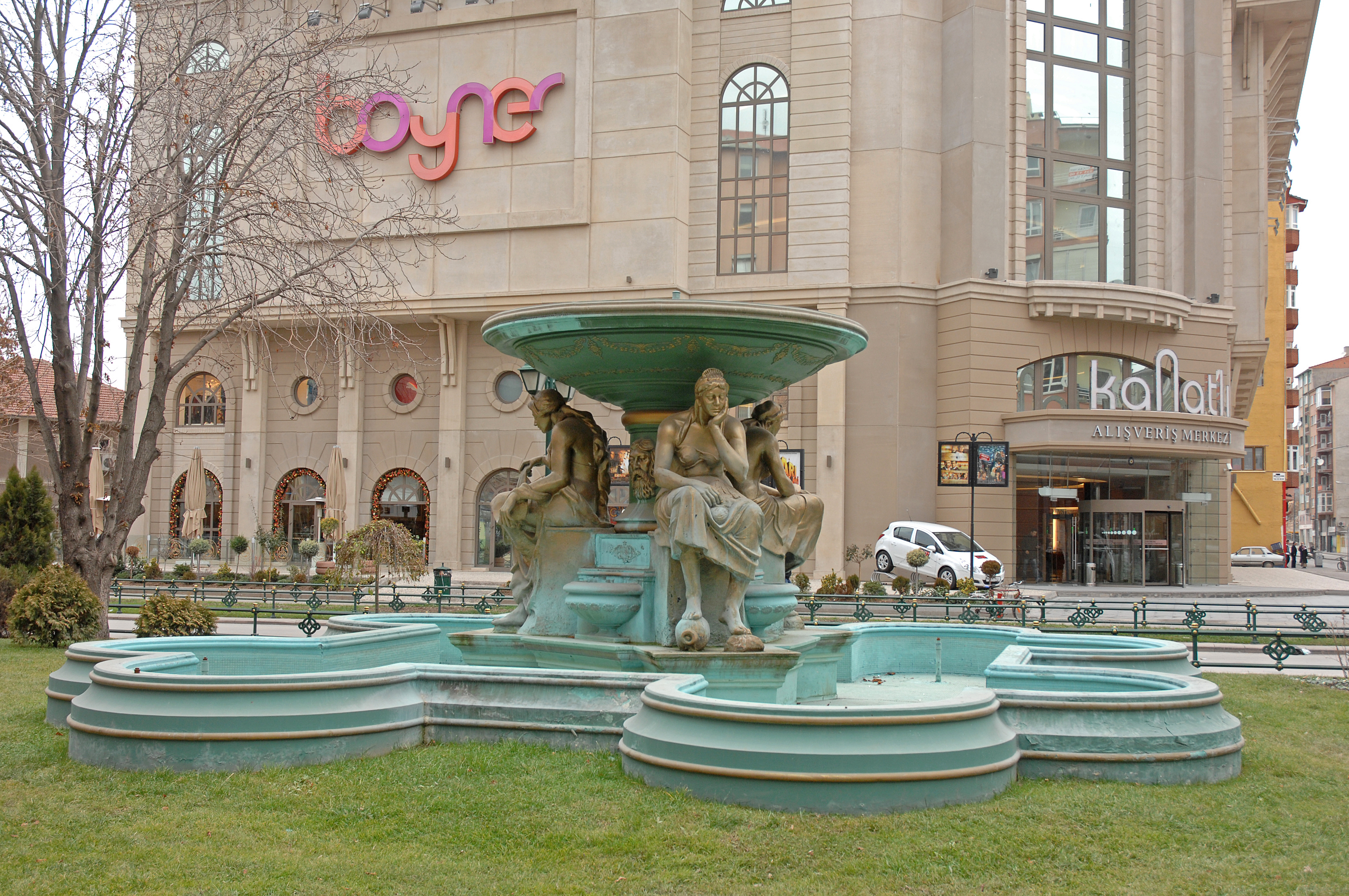
Boyner department store in Eskişehir, 2007

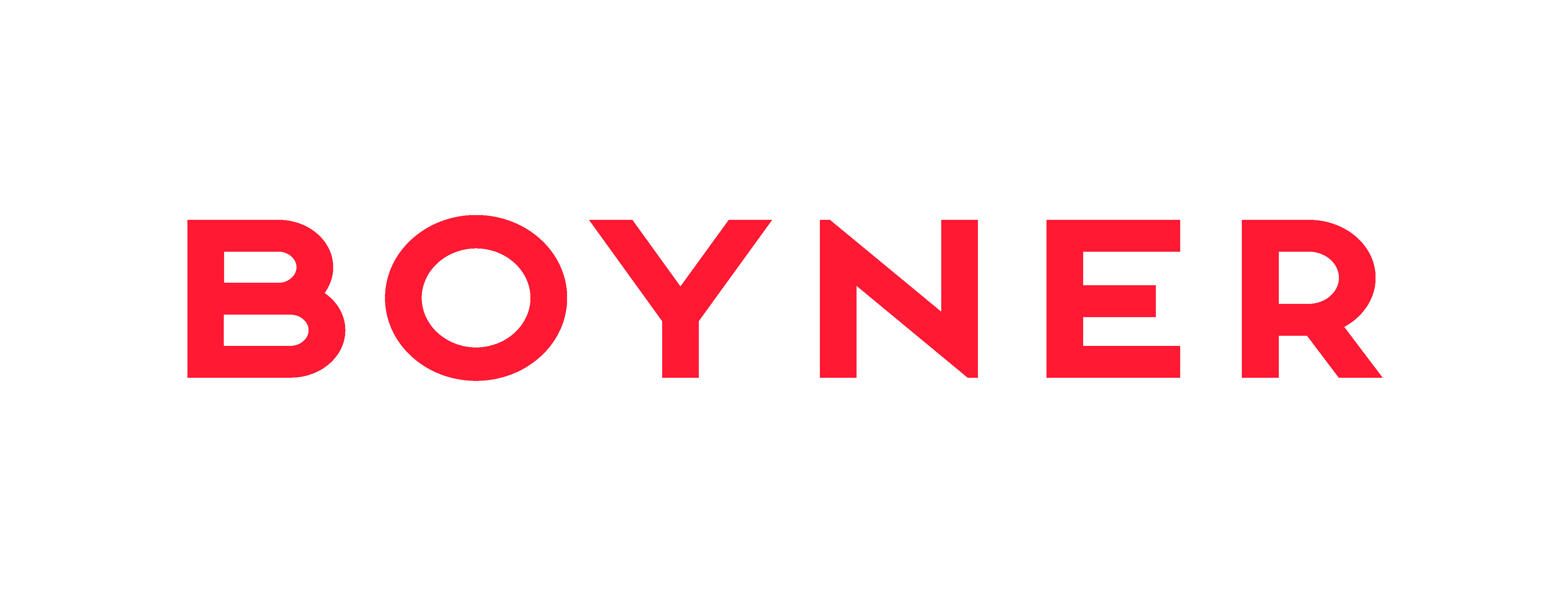
Current Boyner dept. store logo as of 2024

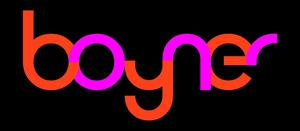
Old Boyner dept. store logo as of 2007
