= Vadistanbul =

Mixed-use development in Istanbul

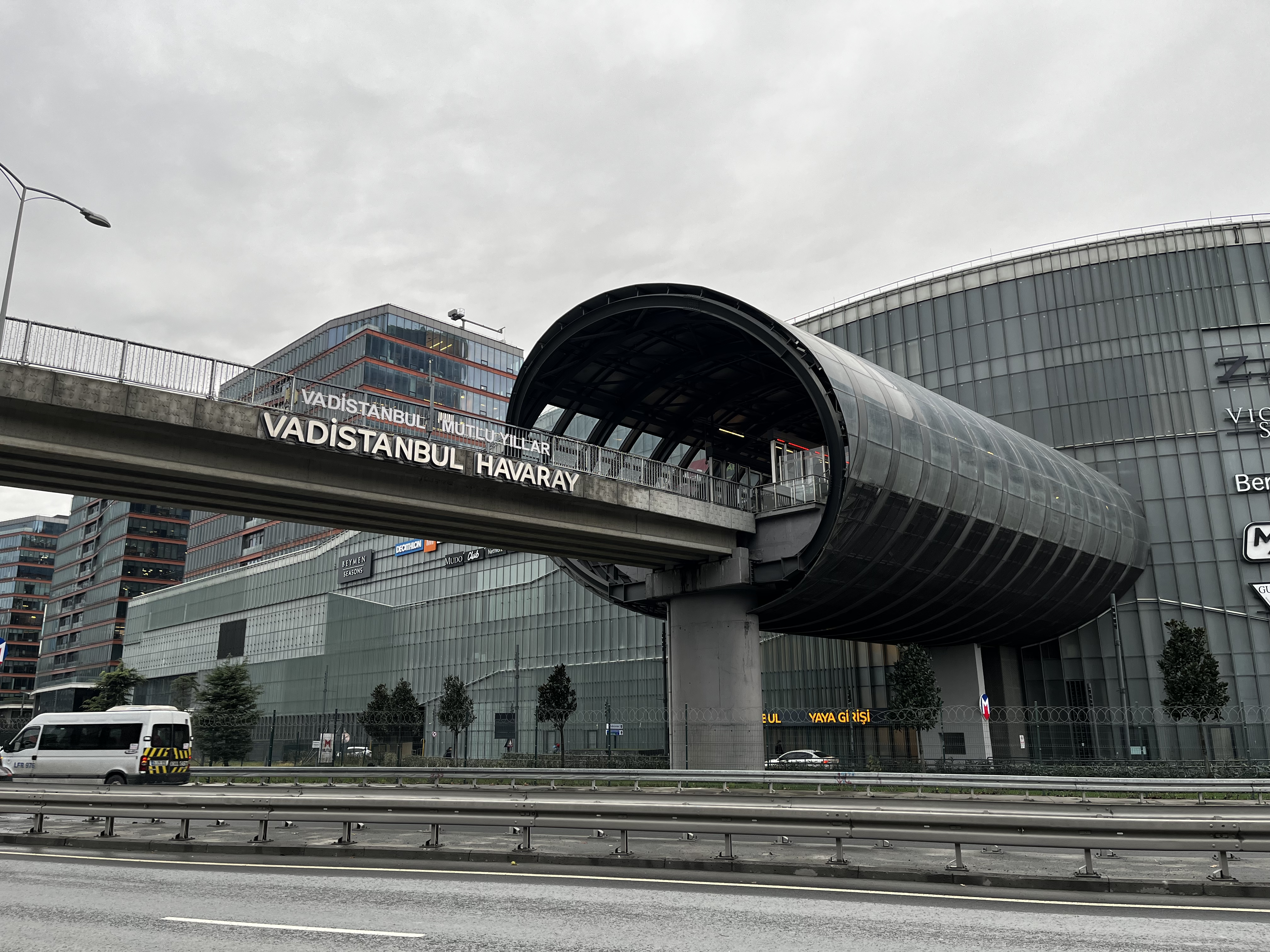
Bridge from Vadistanbul funicular station at the Vadistanbul shopping center

Vadistanbul is a shopping center and mixed-use complex in the Ayazağa neighborhood, Sarıyer district, Istanbul. It forms the northern edge of the Istanbul Central Business District, a series of clustered residential and office towers, shopping malls, hospitals, universities, venues, etc. stretching 10 km northward from Taksim Square. It opened in 2017 and is 103,000 m^{2} (1,110,000 sq ft) in size including a 2,000-square-meter decorative pool with a water and flame jet show. Seyrantepe station on line M2 of the Istanbul Metro is east of the area and is connected by Istanbul's first horizontal funicular line, that brings passengers to Vadistanbul station. It is a project of Invest Construction (Turkish: Invest Inşaat).

The mall includes branches of Decathlon as well as of the department stores Beymen and Ramsey.

The surrounding area of Huzur and Seyrantepe neighborhood includes the Rams Park stadium and the Skyland residential and office tower complex.

The Radisson Blu Hotel Vadistanbul (the first in Turkey) opened here in 2019 and the Mövenpick Living Istanbul Saklıvadi hotel opened in the complex in 2024. In 2018 the Alternatif Bank, 100% owned by the Commercial Bank of Qatar, opened its headquarters here.

== Gallery ==
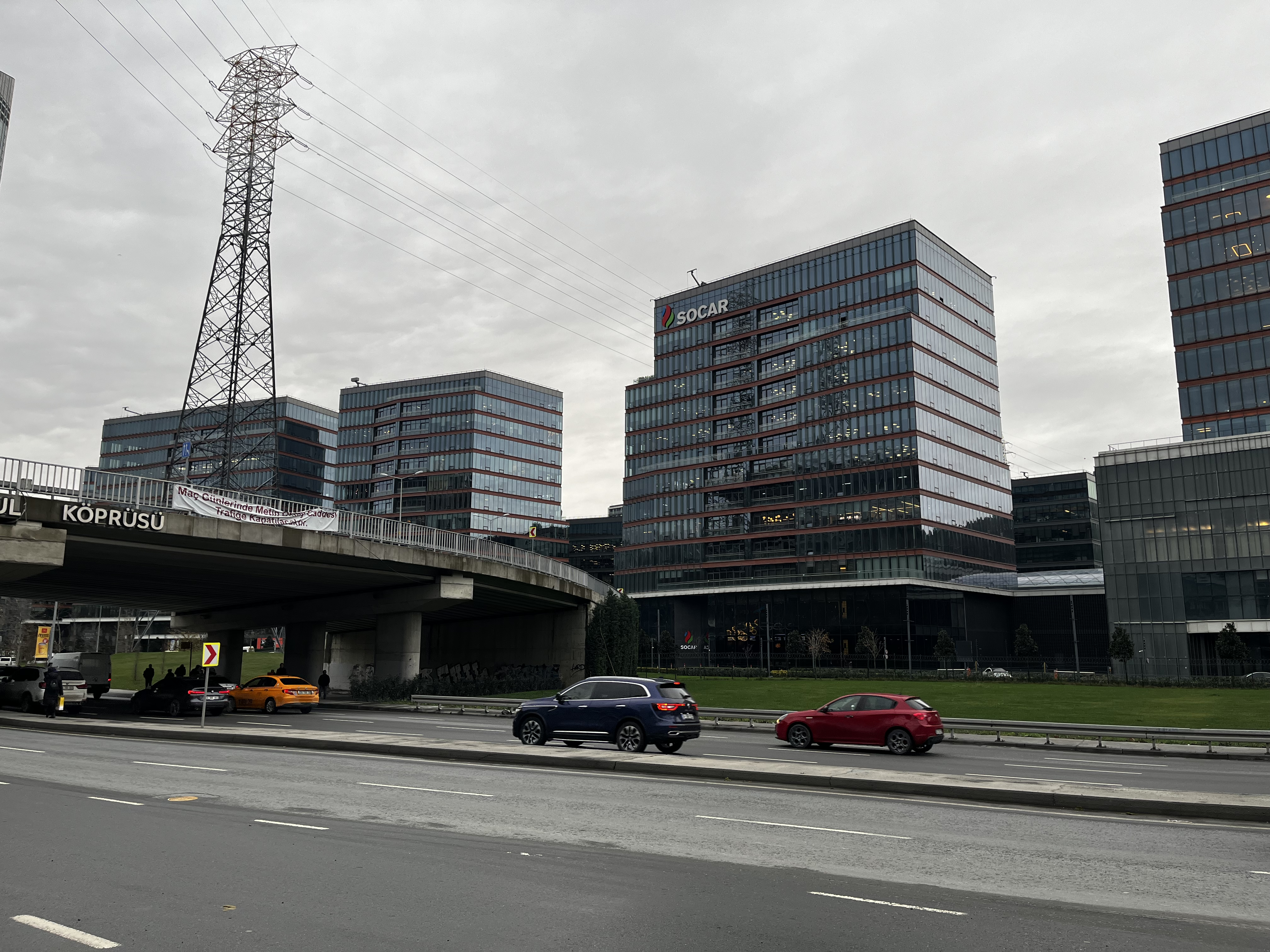
Offices of the Azerbaijan state oil co. SOCAR

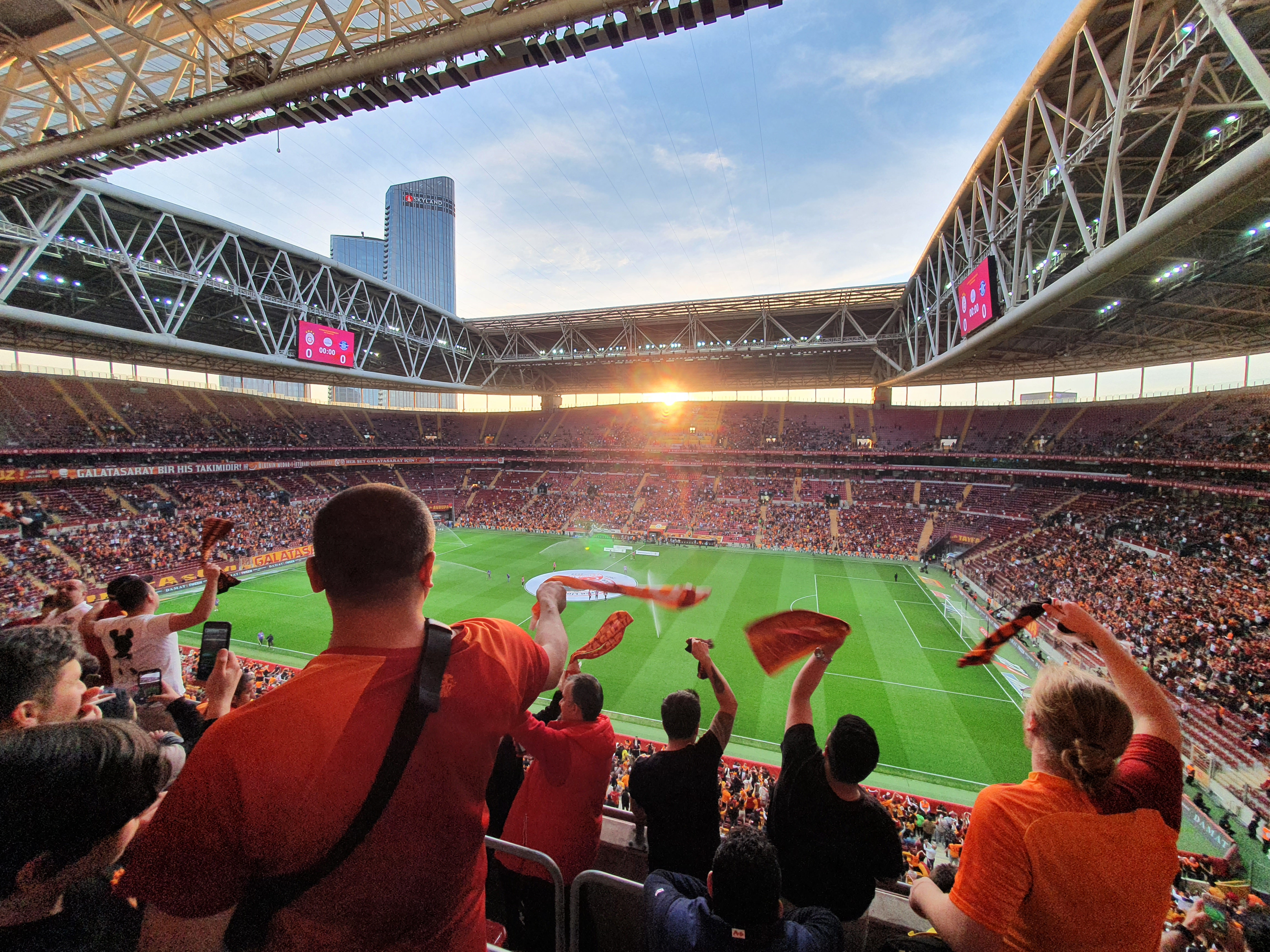
Rams Park stadium

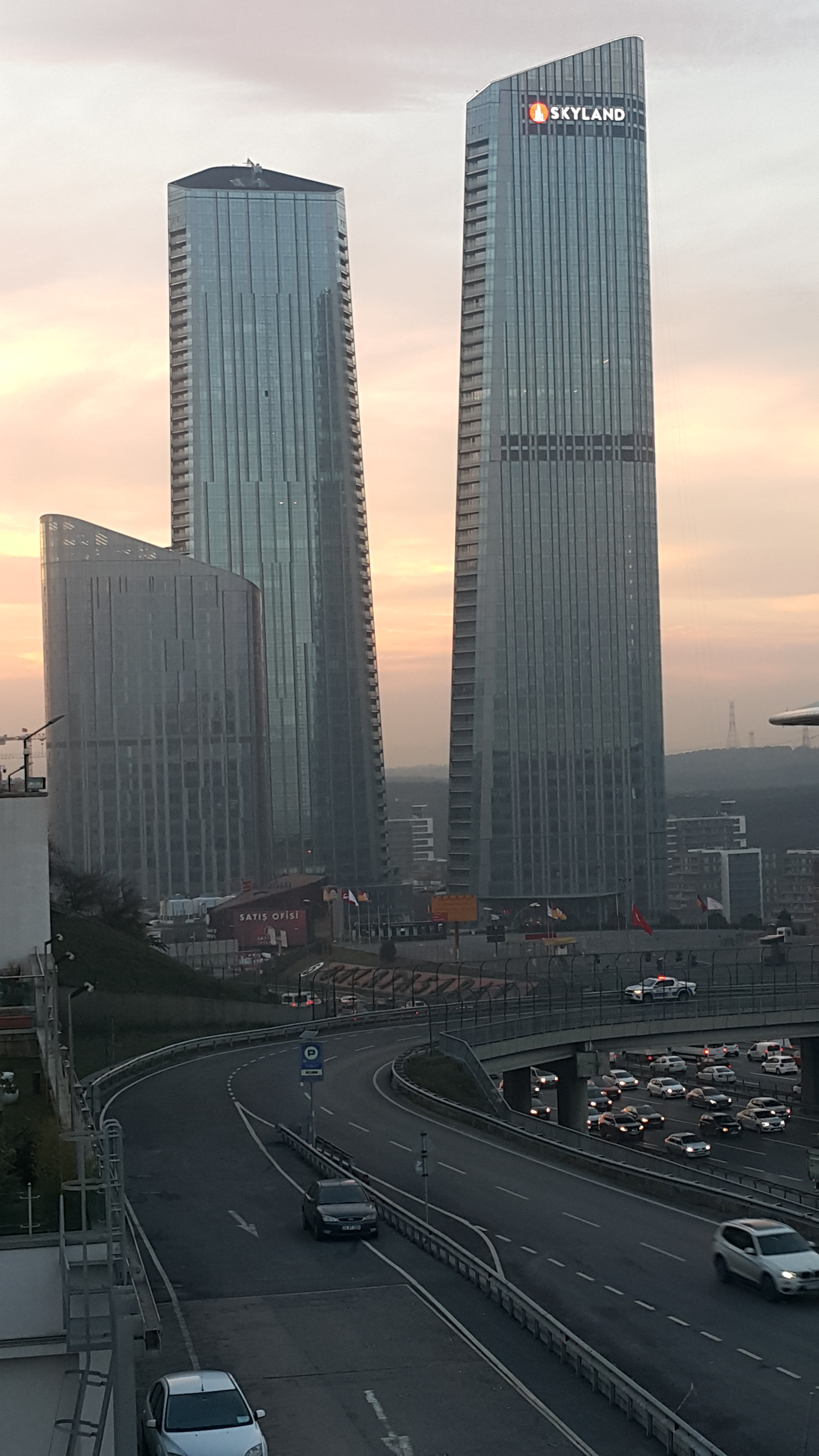
Skyland İstanbul
