= Konak Pier =

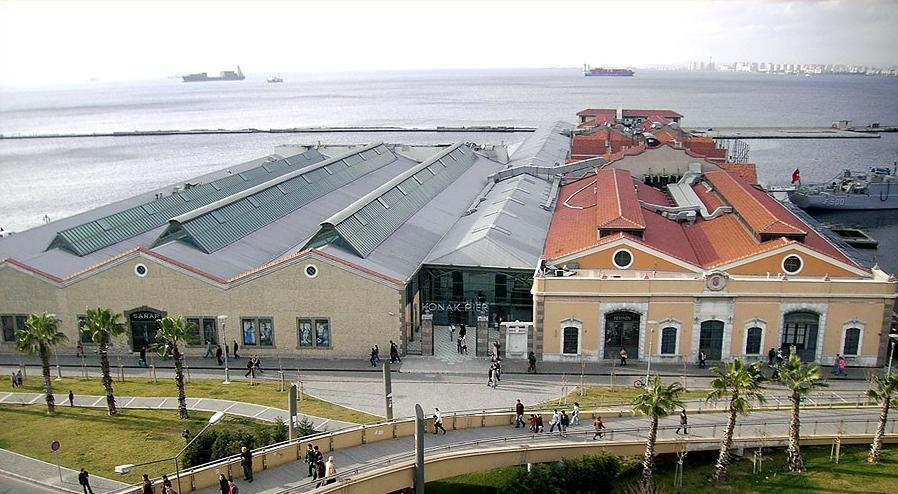
Konak Pier

The Konak Pier is a pier in the Turkish city of İzmir. It was built in 1875-1890 by the famous French architect and construction engineer Gustave Eiffel, to function as a customs building. It was built close to historical Konak Square and adds significant value to the area even now. The building was constructed with stone masonry and covered with rough plaster. For the roof design wood trusses were added. Even though it was meant to be a customs building, its function changed several times. In 1960 it started to function as a fish market. With the restructuring efforts in 2003–2004, Konak Pier gained its current look and function as an upmarket shopping center.

== Context ==
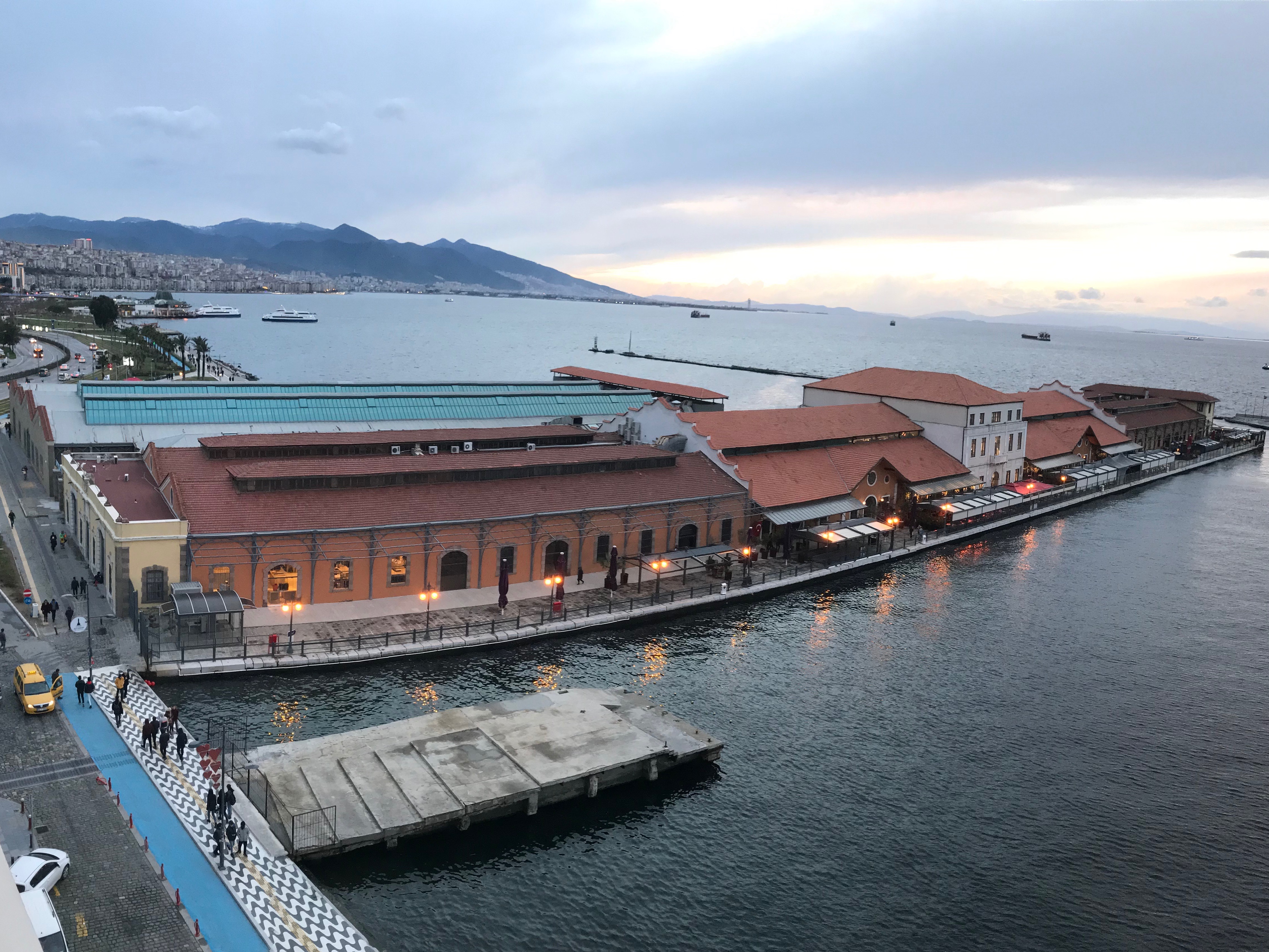
Designed by Gustave Eiffel in 1890, the Konak Pier has numerous shops, cafés and restaurants.

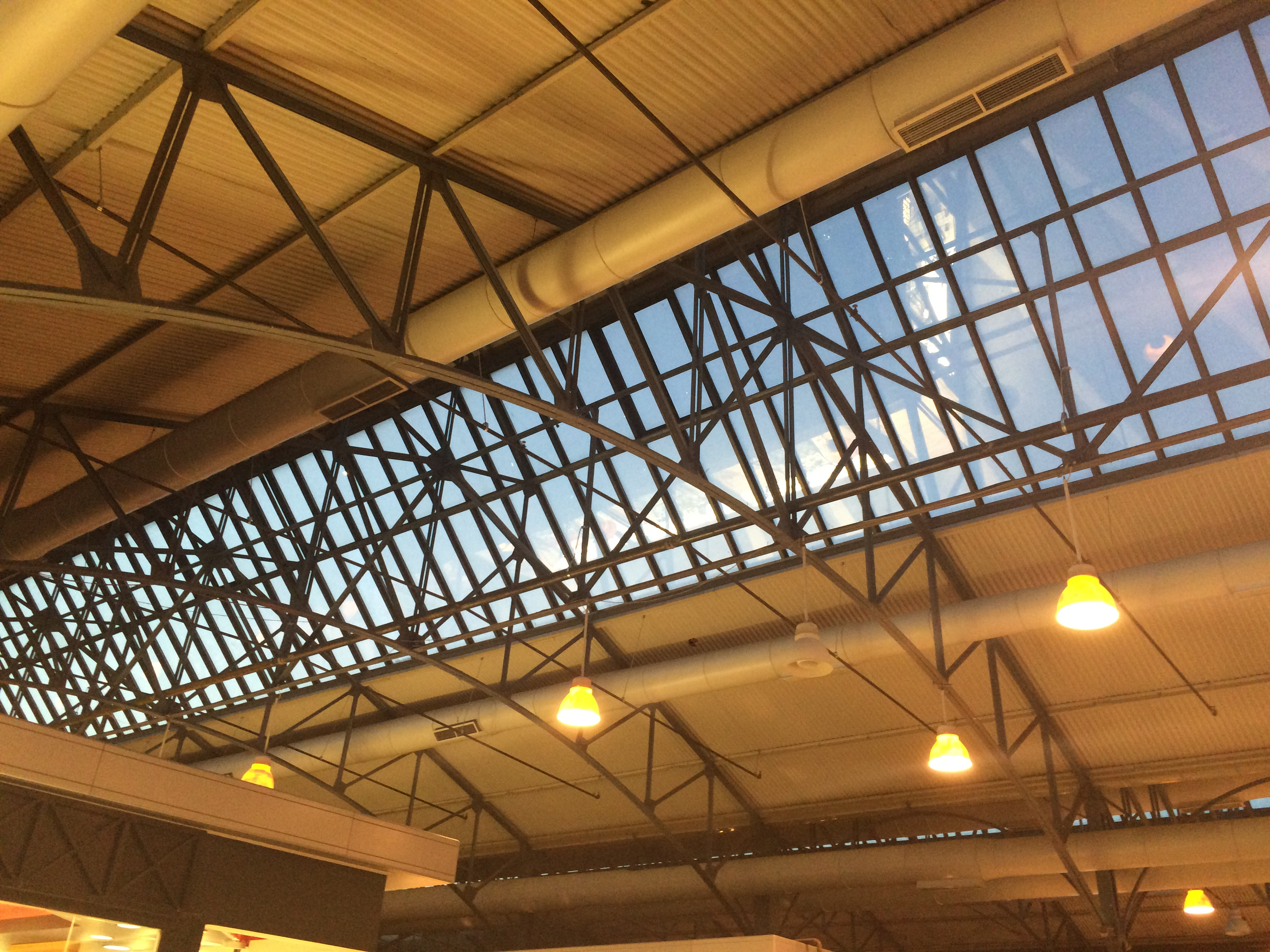
Konak Pier, roof truss system

The building's location can be considered in an urban context due to its developing industrial surroundings. It is located close to two of the city marks like İzmir's famous Clock Tower and Konak Square.

When it was functioning as a customs building, the building was close to the dock where every export product from European countries were loaded.

Today Konak Pier has become a city mark that İzmir is associated with. The building is a remarkable example of contrast with its modern steel constructed additions and its both historical and modern surroundings.

The façade that faces the first kordon is the most decorated one. The building contains several entries. One from the additional part which is on the South façade. The other entry is located on the east façade of the building which faces the pedestrian bridge.

== Formal qualities ==
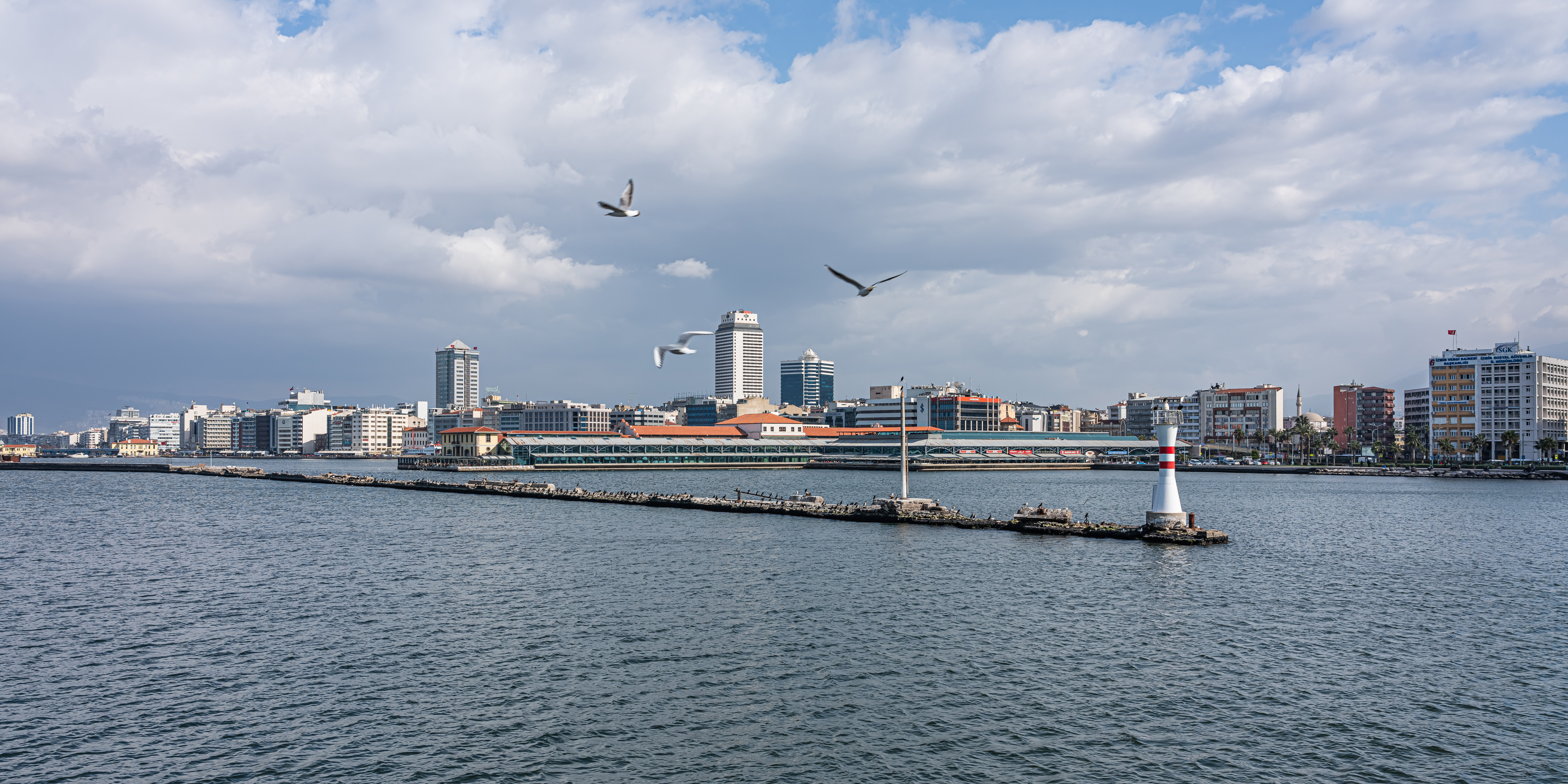
Konak Pier, view of the steel structure from the Aegean Sea

The plan of the building can be considered as combined prismatic forms. The long rectangular form is the restored old building and the square shaped part is steel and crick constructed additional part. Both parts have similar interior qualities and roof structure.

The interior consists of partition walls for the shops and stone masonry exterior walls. The details of the building arched openings and marvel floors.

The approach to the building doesn't give any clues of the building layout like any other mall. One sees a long corridor which surrounded with cinema and stores on each sides. Stores are located parallel to each other with wide walkways. The truss system of the roof can be seen from inside. And because of the small openings to outside one can see small birds like sparrows which gives the building cozy and intimate look.

== Structure and material qualities ==
The construction of the building can be explained with stone masonry and rough plaster cover. Later on second floor was added with concrete slabs and brick walls. The later addition part was constructed with cast iron columns and steel profiled points on top of it.
