= Seyrantepe station =

Metro station in Istanbul, Turkey

Seyrantepe (M2) Seyrantepe (F3)
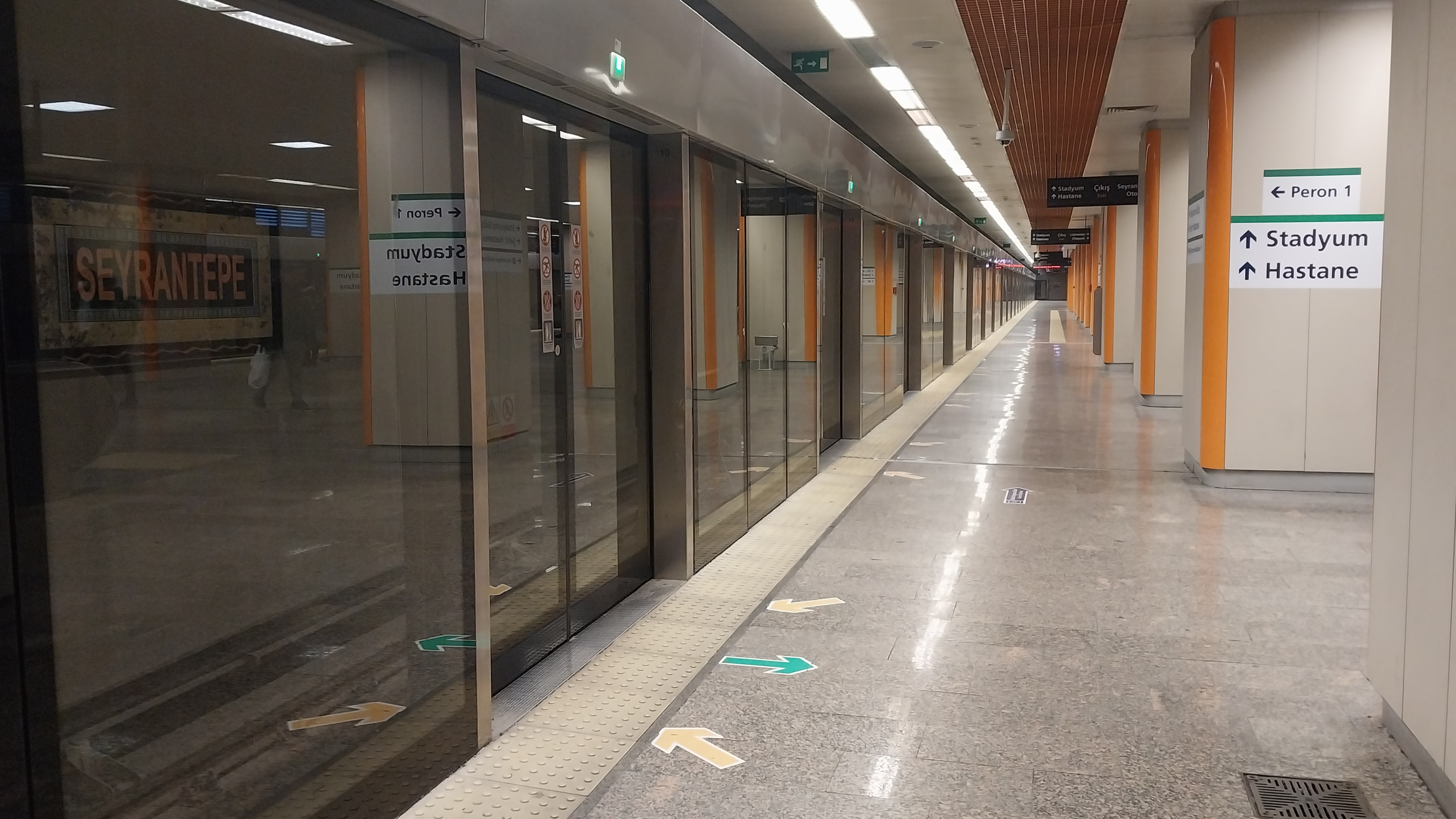

General information
- Location: Huzur Mah., 34396; Sarıyer, Istanbul
- Coordinates: 41.1010°N 28.9949°E
- System: Istanbul Metro rapid transit station
- Owner: Istanbul Metropolitan Municipality
- Lines: M2; F3
- Platforms: 1 island platform
- Tracks: 2
- Connections: İETT Bus: 27SE, 41SM, 41ST, 62H, 65A; Istanbul Minibus: Seyrantepe-Topkapı

Construction
- Structure type: Underground
- Accessible: Yes

History
- Opened: 11 November 2010 (M2 platform); 29 October 2017 (F3 platform)
- Electrified: 750V DC Third rail

Services
Preceding station	Istanbul Metro	Following station
Terminus	M2 Line	Sanayi Mahallesi Terminus
Vadistanbul Terminus	F3	Terminus
Location

Seyrantepe is a station on the M2 line of the Istanbul Metro. It is the western terminus of the 1.8 km (1.1 mi) Seyrantepe branch of the line, with shuttle trains operating back and forth, to Sanayi Mahallesi. The most notable structure near the station is the Ali Sami Yen Sports Complex, the home stadium of Galatasaray S.K.; located adjacent to the station on the other side of the Istanbul Outer Beltway. Seyrantepe station, along with the Seyrantepe branch, opened on 11 November 2010.

== Layout ==
Eastbound	toward Sanayi Mahallesi →
Island platform
Eastbound	toward Sanayi Mahallesi →
