= Olaf Hajek =

German painter

Olaf Hajek is a German-based illustrator, painter, artist, graphic designer, and author.

Born in North Germany by the Danish frontier, Hajek lives in Germany, London, and New York City. Originally studying to be a graphic designer, Olaf switched to illustration and taught alongside the likes of punk fashion legend, Vivienne Westwood.

Hajek's illustrations have been featured in publications like the Financial Times, The New Yorker, Playboy, Rolling Stone, The Wall Street Journal, The New York Times, GQ, and Architectural Digest.

== Personal life ==
Olaf Hajek was born on 12 December 1965 in Rendsburg, Germany, along the Northern frontier to Denmark. Though he was born in Germany, he was raised in the Netherlands before attending art school. Hajek originally went to art school at Fachhochschule Düsseldorf to study graphic design, yet switched to illustration classes when he decided he did not want to spend his career in front of the computer. Spending his early professional years in Amsterdam, he took advantage of the social scene to gain connections as a freelance illustrator.

== Themes ==
Hajek's work shows strong influence from Frida Kahlo, Botticelli, and Cuban advertising posters from the 1960s

== Technique ==
Hajek paints his illustrations, and his typical medium is acrylic on cardboard, paper, or wood. He works as a painter for all his illustrations. Hajek never works on a digital medium, and his works always retain their graphic feel, despite their painted appearance.

== Notable pieces ==
His pieces for fashion houses include YSL Maxim Fashion, Dior Maxim Fashion, Gucci Maxim Fashion, Helmut Lang Maxim Fashion, and Lacroix Haute Couture. He has also done portraits of figures including Chuck Berry, Kristian Schuller, Kurt Cobain, Fiona Miliner, and Claudia Skoda. He has also worked on advertising for United Airlines, the Coca-Cola factory in Copenhagen, an Apple educational ad, Ritz Carlton USA, Design Hotels, a Vodafone advertisement, Love Berlin, and the Olympics. He also does magazine work such as Lost Authors in Neon Magazine, Oveset Magazine Berlin, Rolling Stone, and Shoes for The New York Vertica Brochure. Some of his most gallery works include Underwater Ballet, Foret Noir, White Black, La Vie, the Nature Man series, Masked Girl, Iris, Voyage Voyage, and Corner 2 Frei.

== Clients ==
As an illustrator, Hajek has been hired by many clients. He has done illustration work for many big clients including Apple, United Airlines, Macy’s, Bloomberg Inc, Bacardi, The Ritz Carlton, Nike, Daimler Chrysler, and Barney's.

In 2011 Hajek was hired by 25hours Hotel, a German chain, to design the wallpaper for their hotel opening in Vienna.

== Publications ==
Hajek has illustrated for many publications, including The New Yorker, NZZ, SZ Magazin, Shape, Bolero, The New York Times, Gourmet, Paste, Time, Stern, Architectural Digest, The Wall Street Journal, IO Donna, MAN, Travel & Leisure, Forbes, Playboy, Business Week, Capital, Financial Times, Food Illustrated, Los Angeles Times, and the Royal Mail.

Hajek is also featured in many books, including American Illustration, Illustration Now, 200 Best Illustrators Worldwide: Lürzer's Archive Special, and Freistil 1& 2. Hajek has also illustrated the nature scene on the cover of The New York Times 2009 Book Review.

== Awards ==
Hajek has won: The Silver Award UK (2003), The Gold Award at Art Directors Club Europe (2003), The Silver Award at Art Directors Club Germany (2003), Leadaward Gold (2004), and the Leadaward Silver (2004).

== Exhibitions ==
Most of Hajek's gallery and art exhibitions are premiered in the city where he primarily works, Berlin. In 2004 Hajek had first Group Exhibition at NOTANGO, Berlin. In 2006 Hajek had his second Berlin show, as an Illustrative Preview at the Galerie Johanssen. He opened three shows in 2007. He opened at the Illustrative 07 in Berlin, and then Paris, as well as being featured in the Group Exhibition BBAX07 in Buenos Aires. His work was featured in more Berlin shows in 2008 and 2009, and once again at the Galerie Johanssen and Illustrative 09 for his Maskerade exhibition. His most recent exhibitions were his Maskerade exhibition at the Marci Wood Gallery in Atlanta, Georgia and the Whatiftheworld Gallery in Cape Town, South Africa in 2011.

== 'Flowerhead' ==
Flowerhead was Hajek's first book released in Europe February 2010 by Gestalten. It was released internationally in March 2010, and is full of his editorial and advertising work, including commercial portraits, fashion illustration, and his own personal pieces from over the years.
