= Sanko Park =

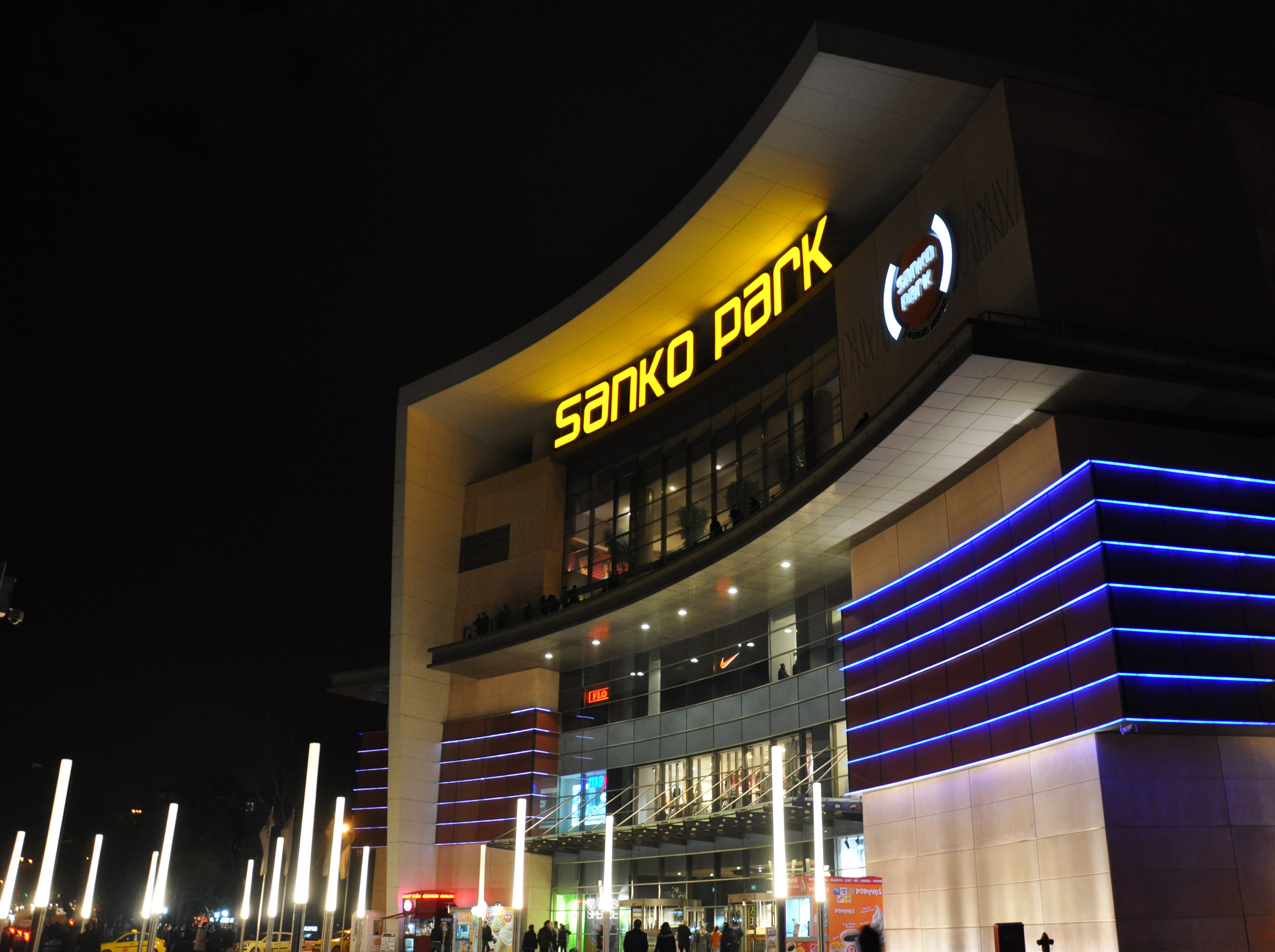
- Night view, 2011
- Location: Gaziantep, Turkey
- Coordinates: 37.063062°N 37.359931°E
- Address: İshak Rafet İşitmen Caddesi (Street), Şehitkamil district
- Opened: March 2009
- Developer: Rönesans Gayrimenkul
- Num. of stores: 216+
- Floor area: 55,000 square metres (590,000 sq ft)
- Floors: 4
- Website: www.sankopark.com

Sanko Park is an enclosed shopping mall located in Gaziantep, Turkey. The largest enclosed mall in the region, construction of the US$160 million project began in 2007, and the centre opened in the spring of 2009.

Because of its location in southeastern Turkey, it draws a significant number of shoppers from nearby Syria. The mall is approximately a two-hour drive from Aleppo, the largest city in northern Syria. With the elimination of visa requirements for travel between Turkey and Syria in September 2009, the center saw the number of Syrian shoppers rise from approximately 3,000 per month to 50,000 by early 2010.

The four story structure has about 55,000 square meters (590,000 sq ft) of leasable space. Anchor tenants include a Carrefour hypermarket and Marks & Spencer, and the first floor features an ice rink.

The center was developed by Rönesans Gayrimenkul (Renaissance Construction), a real estate concern that has developed a number of centers in the country.
