= Piyalepaşa İstanbul =

Shopping mall in Istanbul, Turkey

General information
- Status: continuing
- Classification: mixed-used project consisting of houses, residences, offices, hotel and shopping street
- Location: İstanbul, Piyalepaşa, Beyoğlu İstanbul TURKEY, Turkey
- Construction started: 2015
- Cost: 800 million dollars

Design and construction
- Architecture firm: İki Design Group Mimarlık
- Developer: Piyalepaşa Gayrimenkul Geliştirme Yatırımı ve Ticaret A.Ş.

Website
- www.piyalepasa.com

The Piyalepaşa İstanbul is being constructed in the Piyalepaşa Region, which is one of the oldest neighborhoods of Istanbul.

The architectural project contains overtones of Seljuk and Ottoman architecture and has been prepared by iki design group. “Piyalepaşa İstanbul” is coherent with the neighborhood and its history. A nostalgic project has been designed with multi-skin facades, broad eaves, bays, pools and an inner court system which befits the city and the neighborhood.

“Piyalepaşa Istanbul” has a central location in the city and has connections to the D-100 highway and belt highways, to the Dolmabahçe and Kağıthane tunnels, and it is close to the Çağlayan Courthouse and the hospitals. Moreover, there is public transportation to central points of the city such as Beyoğlu İstiklal Avenue, Karaköy, Kabataş, Nişantaşı and Beşiktaş.

The whole project has been accepted for evaluation for the ‘LEED Neighborhood Development’ certificate and the 3 blocks for offices and the hotel have been accepted for evaluation for the ‘LEED Green Building’ certificate. The project will be one of the first projects with LEED Neighborhood Development certificate in Turkey and in the world.

== Piyalepaşa Real Estate Development and Investment Co. ==
Piyalepaşa Gayrimenkul Geliştirme Yatırımı ve Ticaret A.Ş. was founded in 2012 in order to transfer the 60 years of experience of the Polat brand in the construction sector to the ‘urban renewal’ field. Piyalepaşa Real Estate Development is carrying out the first and largest urban renewal project of Turkey realized by the private sector in Piyalepaşa, which is one of the oldest and most attractive neighborhoods of Istanbul.
