= Piyalepaşa, Beyoğlu =

Piyalepaşa
- Neighbourhood
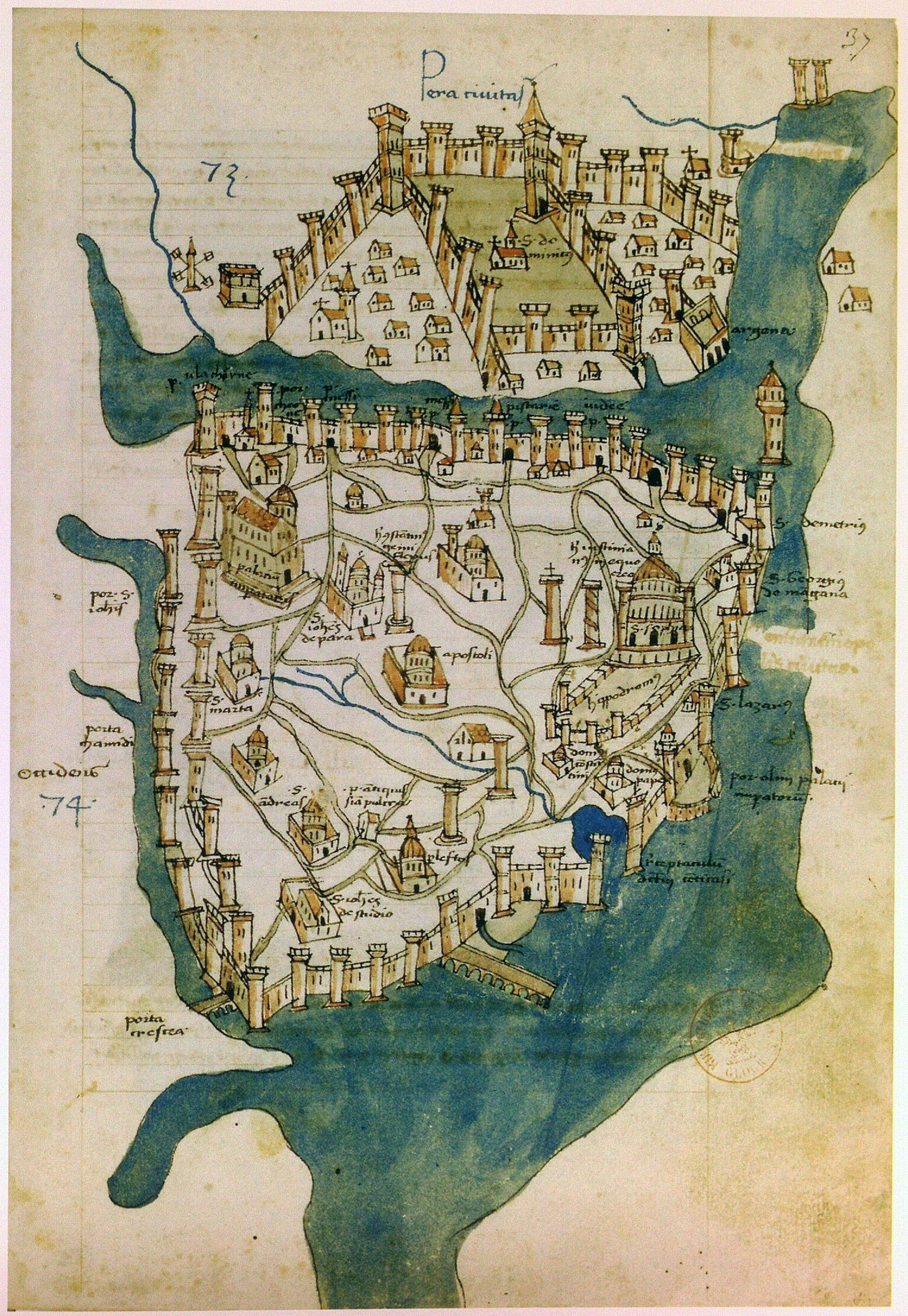

- Location within Turkey Location within Istanbul
- Coordinates: 41.0490°N 28.9637°E
- Country: Turkey
- Province: Istanbul
- District: Beyoğlu
- Population (2022): 21,265
- Time zone: UTC+3 (TRT)
- Postal code: 34440
- Area code: 0212

Piyalepaşa is a neighbourhood in the municipality and district of Beyoğlu, Istanbul Province, Turkey. Its population is 21,265 (2022). It is on the European Side of Istanbul. The bordering quarters are Kaptanpaşa to the south, Fetihtepe to the west, Mahmutşevketpaşa, which remains in the district of Şişli, to the east, and Mehmet Akif Ersoy, which remains in the district of Kağıthane, to the north. After Piyalepaşa was declared as a "risk area", the urban transformation project was initiated in the neighborhood.

== Transportation ==
While using the E5 highway; Piyalepaşa Boulevard is reached by turning in the direction of Kasımpaşa from the Çağlayan junction located next to the Çağlayan Courthouse. When on the TEM route, after reaching the Okmeydanı Junction via the Hasdal, Okmeydanı access road, Piyalepaşa Boulevard can be reached by continuing in the direction of Kasımpaşa.

== History ==
Piyalepaşa is one of the oldest quarters in Istanbul. Due to its location, it has always been the focus of trade and life in the history of Istanbul. In the 1570s, Piali Pasha (Turkish: Piyale Paşa) commissioned a social complex comprising a mosque, madrasa, dervish lodge, school, tomb, hamam (Turkish bathhouse) and fountain in this area and the quarter is named after him. The residents of the neighborhoods established in Piyalepaşa Quarter during the era of Suleiman the Magnificent and Selim II were composed of masters in maritime and forging, brought as exiles from the islands, Greece and Georgia. Without doubt, the social complexes composed of a mosque, madrasa, school, dervish lodge, fountain and hamam, commissioned by Kasım Pasha at a place close to the bank and by Piali Pasha in the direction of Okmeydanı, have played and important role in the development of Piyalepaşa. Another important role of the Piyalepaşa Quarter in history is that during the siege and conquest of Istanbul, which affected not only the Ottoman Emperor but also world history, the ships were moved by land from this area.

== Piyalepaşa Mosque, 2015 ==
Piyalepaşa Mosque is located in the Kasımpaşa neighborhood of Istanbul. Featuring multi-pillars, this art piece of architect Mimar Sinan has 6 domes and a rectangular plan. The weight of the domes, supported by a pair of large pillars in the middle of the mosque, is transferred to the basement through side pillars. The mosque is encompassed with arches and vaults on 3 sides on which rises the minaret. The tomb of the constructor Piali Pasha is located on the mihrab side. The mihrab tiles are considered as art pieces. The mosque of the complex is built on an area of 55 x 45 meters. The complex is walled partly by ashlar limestone and partly by rubble stone. The upper area of the mosque, which is equal to 30.50 x 19.70 meters, is covered by six identical domes, each with a diameter of 9 meters. By way of Piyalepaşa Mosque, Sinan adduces the spatial continuity and how to skilfully bring the open space together with the covered space. Architect Mimar Sinan converges the human soul from the earthly spaces to the spiritual and ethereal values step by step by combining every detail with simplicity as well as an advanced skill at Piyalepaşa Mosque.
