= Kağıthane =

- District and municipality
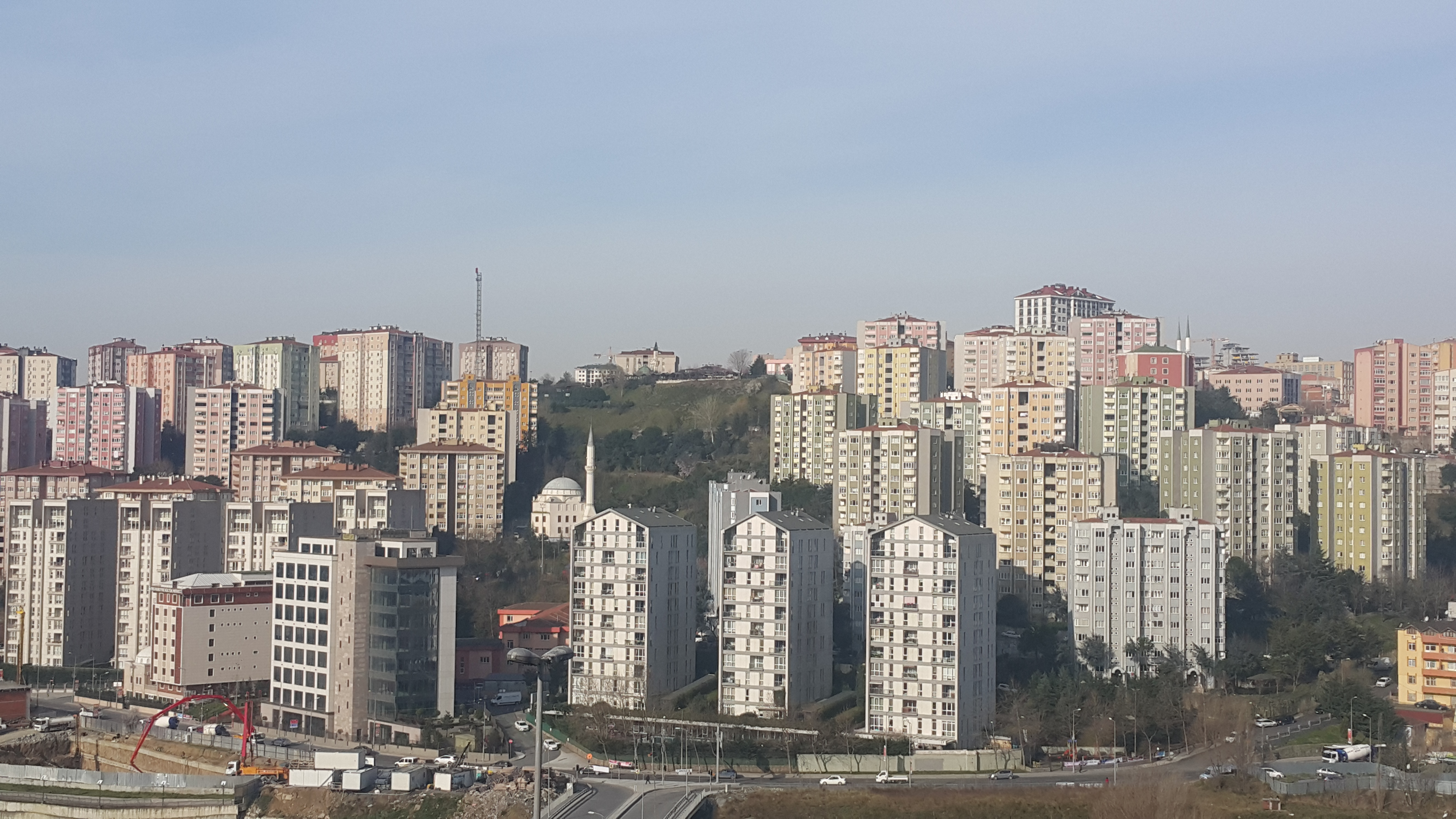
- A view of Kağıthane, Istanbul

- Logo

- Location within Turkey Location within Istanbul
- Coordinates: 41°04′19″N 28°57′59″E
- Country: Turkey
- Province: Istanbul

Government
  - Mayor: Mevlüt Öztekin (AKP)
- Area: 15 km^{2} (5.8 sq mi)
- Population (2022): 455,943
  - Density: 30,000/km^{2} (79,000/sq mi)
- Time zone: UTC+3 (TRT)
- Postal code: 34400
- Area code: 0212
- Website: www.kagithane.bel.tr

Kağıthane (Turkish pronunciation: [ca.ɯt(h)a:ˈne], also Kâğıthane), formerly Sadâbad (Ottoman Turkish: سعدآباد, romanized: Sa‘dābād) and Glykà Nerà (Greek: Γλυκά Νερά, Greek pronunciation: [ɡliˈka neˈra], 'sweet waters') is a municipality and district of Istanbul Province, Turkey. Its area is 15 km^{2}, and its population is 455,943 (2022). It is at the far northern end of the Golden Horn on the European side of Istanbul. It extends along the shores of the Alibeyköy and Kağıthane rivers that discharge into the Golden Horn. Formerly a working class district, Kağıthane is now part of a major real estate development area.

Kağıthane means 'paper mill' in Turkish. The area formed part of the popular picnicking area known as the Sweet Waters of Europe.

The mayor is Mevlüt Öztekin of the governing Ak Parti. Kâğıthane was part of Beyoğlu until 1954 and part of Şişli between 1954 and 1987.

Kağıthane is served by the metro lines M7 and M11 and Çağlayan served by M7 only.

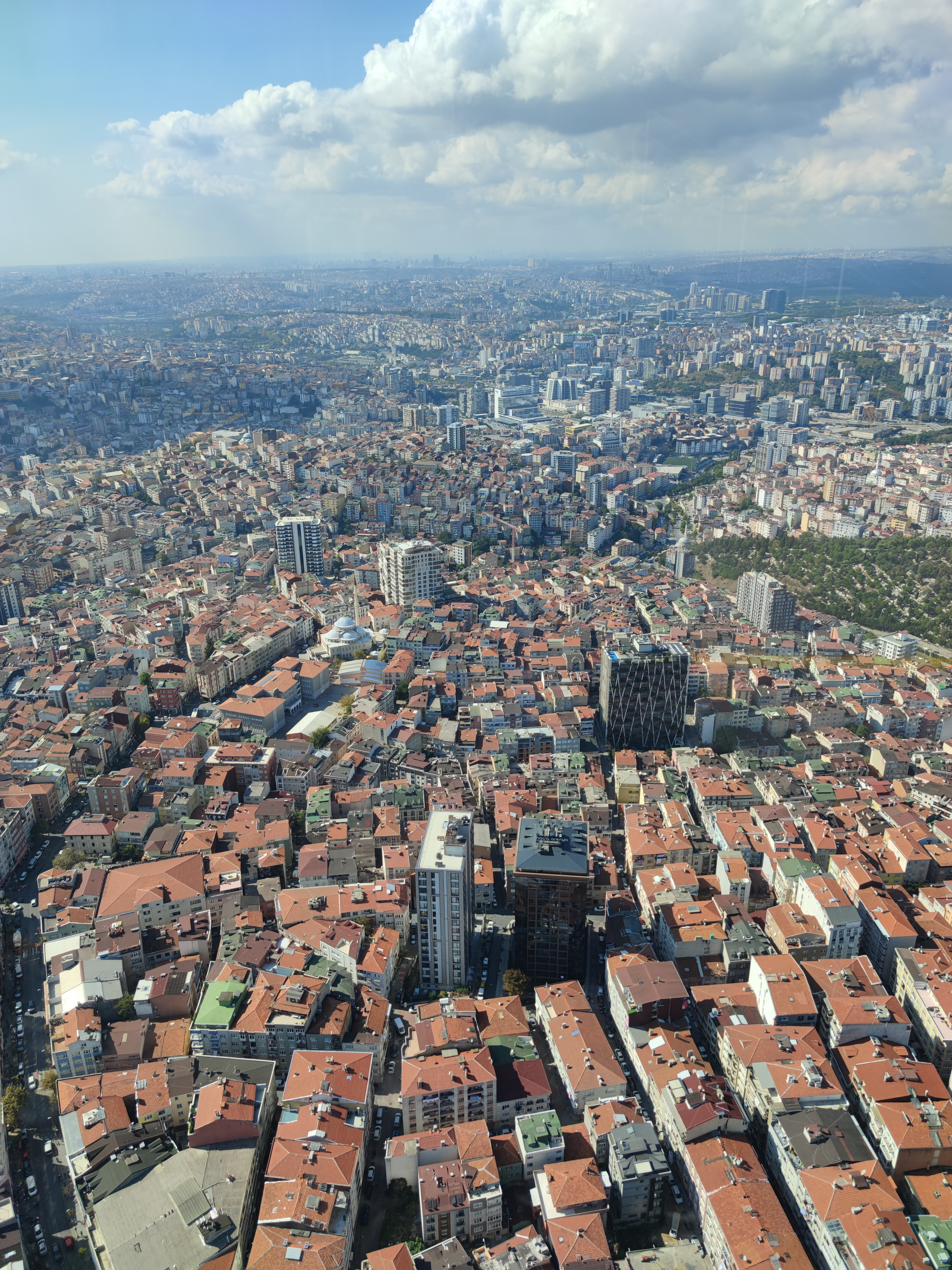
Çeliktepe Neighbourhood

== History ==
During the reign of Suleiman the Magnificent, Kâğıthane, then Sadâbad, was an extensively forested area used by the Ottoman court for hunting, riding and other equestrian pursuits. In the 17th and 18th centuries the area became increasingly fashionable especially during the Tulip Age reign of Sultan Ahmed III when many nobles had mansions and palaces built here. In particular the Sadabad Palace was built here for the statesman Yirmisekiz Mehmet Çelebi in 1722. It was destroyed in 1730 during the uprising against court excesses known as the Patrona Halil Revolt. Scant traces of the mansions and fountains that once graced the area can be seen in a small open-air museum in the grounds of the Kağıthane Municipality (Kağıthane Belediyesi).

During the resign of Sultan Selim III some of the mansions and palaces were rebuilt, as they were again in the mid-19th century when Krikor Balyan was employed to bring Sadabad back to life. Paintings and drawings from the late 19th and early 20th centuries still show Kağıthane as a beauty spot to which locals would flock on Fridays.

During the bombings of Istanbul, the area was affected in 1918.

After the founding of the Turkish Republic in 1923, the northern end of the Golden Horn was turned into an industrial zone. Sadâbad became home to numerous factories. From the 1950s onwards settlement of the Kâğıthane area began with illegal slums (known as gecekondus in Turkish) as thousands of migrants moved from Anatolia to work in the factories, building sites or services sector. Eventually, the gecekondus were legalised and replaced by residentially-zoned buildings.

In the early 21st century Kâğıthane was rapidly transformed by urban regeneration projects due to its central location and connections to the new intra-city transport networks.

== Composition ==
There are 19 neighbourhoods in Kağıthane District:

- Çağlayan
- Çeliktepe
- Emniyet Evleri
- Gültepe
- Gürsel
- Hamidiye
- Harmantepe
- Hürriyet
- Mehmet Akif Ersoy
- Merkez
- Nurtepe
- Ortabayır
- Seyrantepe
- Şirintepe
- Sultan Selim
- Talatpaşa
- Telsizler
- Yahya Kemal
- Yeşilce

== Attractions ==
Santralistanbul started life as the Silahtarağa Power Station, Central Istanbul's first electricity power station, in operation from 1911 to 1983. After decommissioning it was converted into an Energy Museum with an arts and culture space attached in the grounds of the Bilgi University campus.

Kağıthane Mosque was originally built in the reign of Sultan Ahmed III, then rebuilt in the reigns of sultans Selim III and Mahmud II. Finally it was rebuilt for Sultan Abdülaziz by one of the Balyan family of Turkish-Armenian architects. It occupies a pretty waterside site.

Istanbul Sapphire is a combined shopping and residential skyscraper which was, when it opened in 2010, the tallest tower in İstanbul, offering fine views from its viewing platform.

== Transportation ==
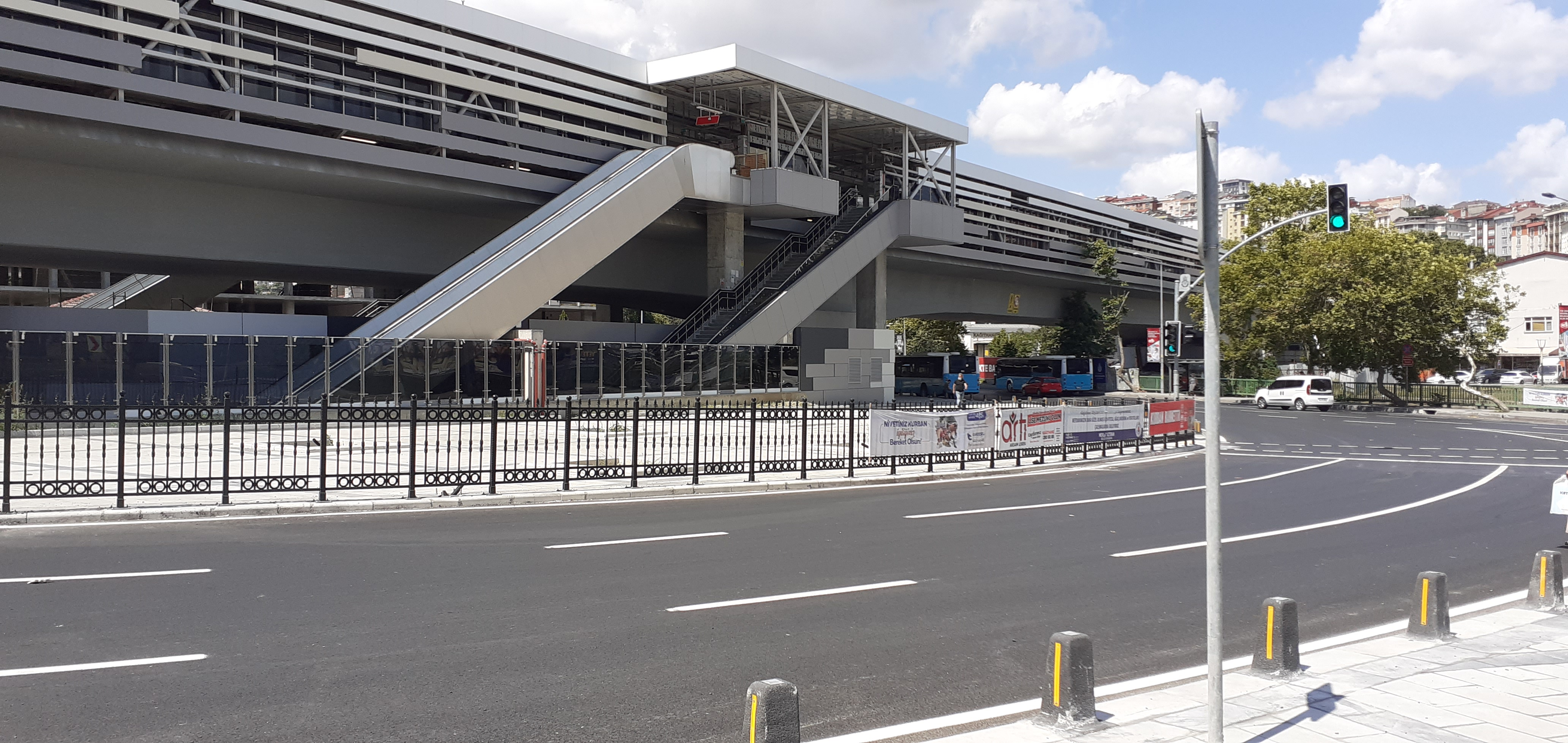
M7 metro station

- 4. Levent
- Çağlayan
- Kağıthane
- Nurtepe
