= İsimlerin Şehri İstanbul =

Sculpture in Istanbul, Turkey

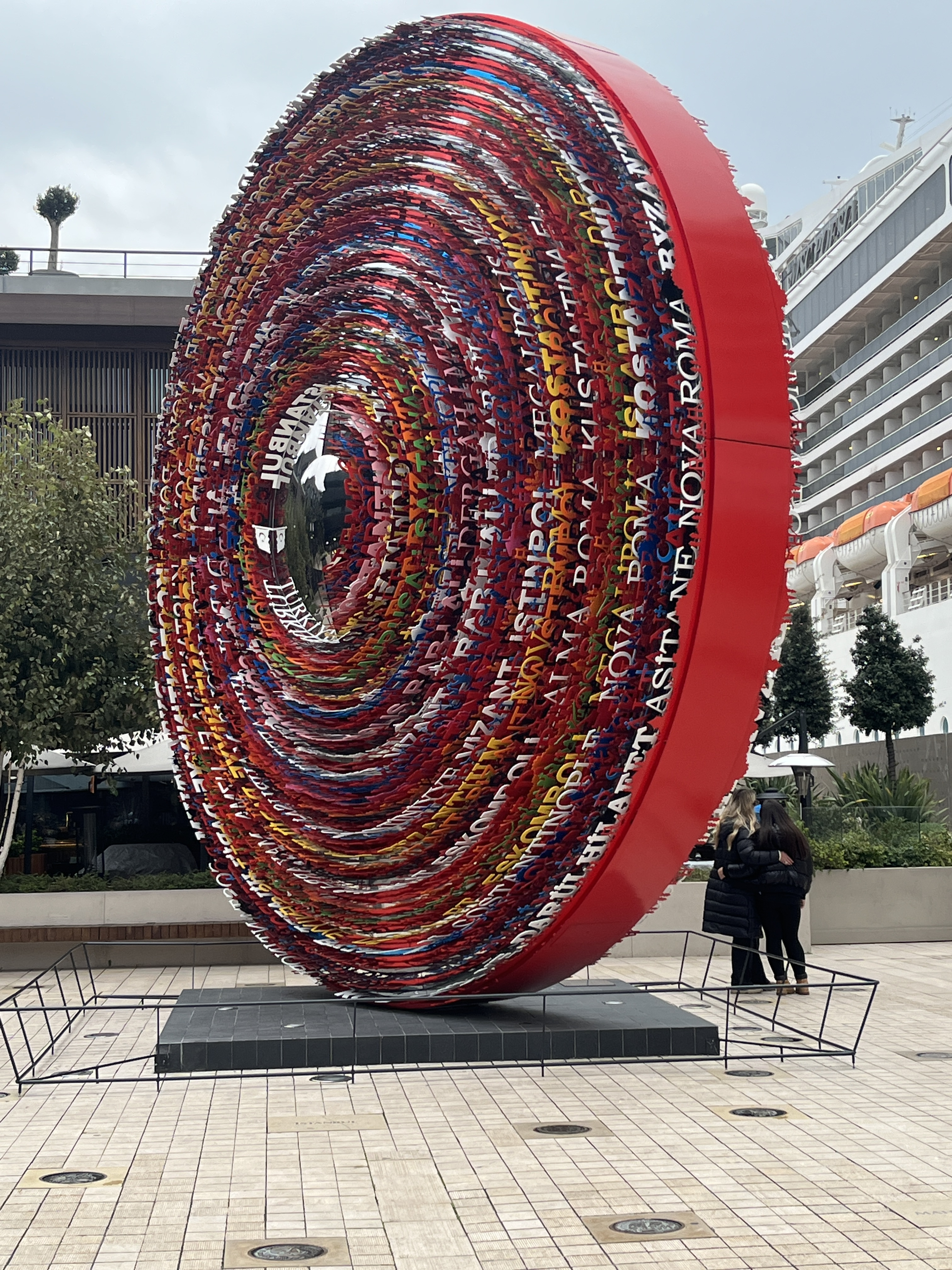
- The sculpture in 2023
- Artist: Ahmet Güneştekin
- Location: Istanbul, Turkey
- 41.02749°N 28.98667°E

İsimlerin Şehri İstanbul is a sculpture by Ahmet Güneştekin, installed at Beyoğlu's Galataport in Istanbul, Turkey.

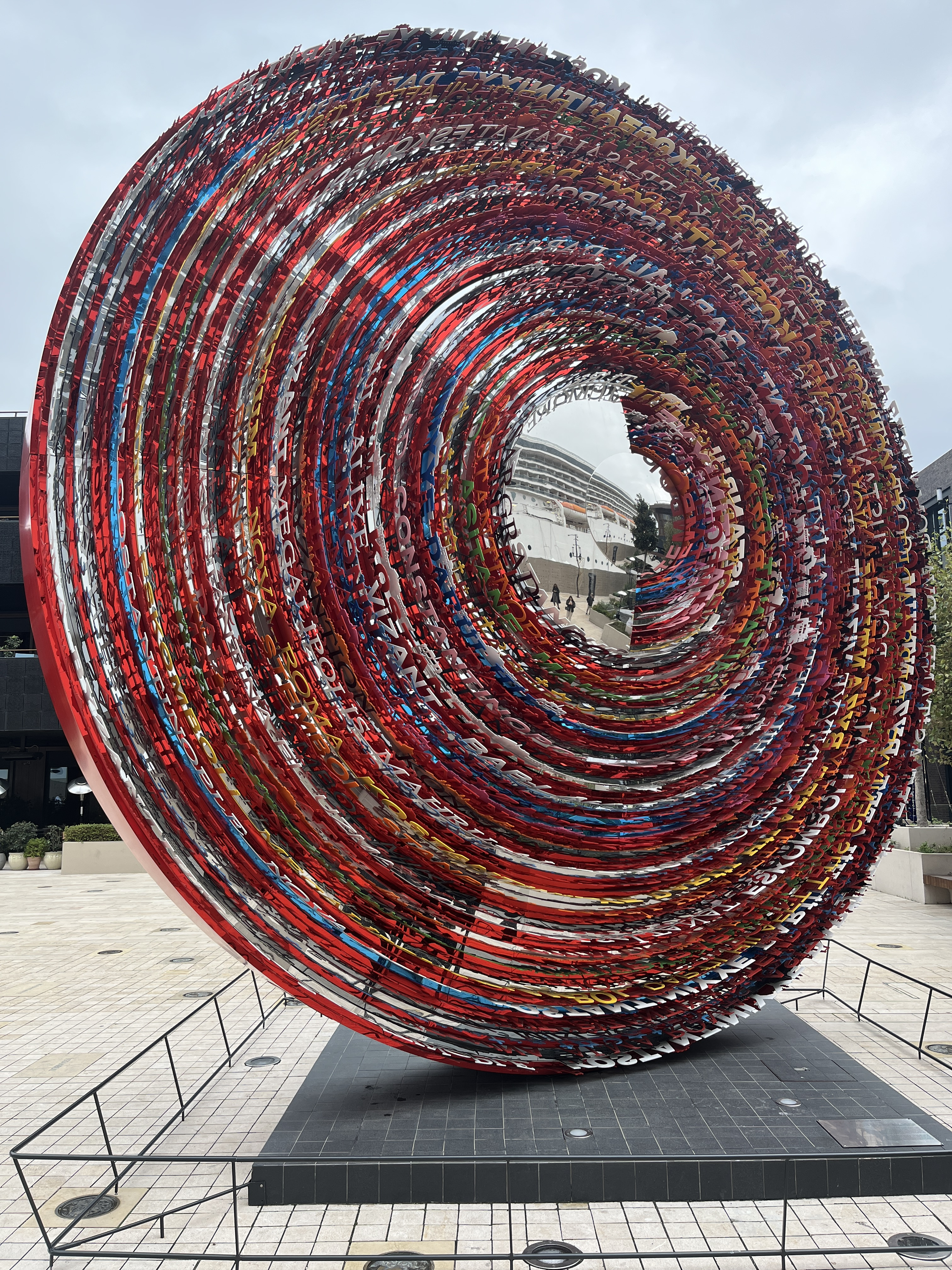
2023

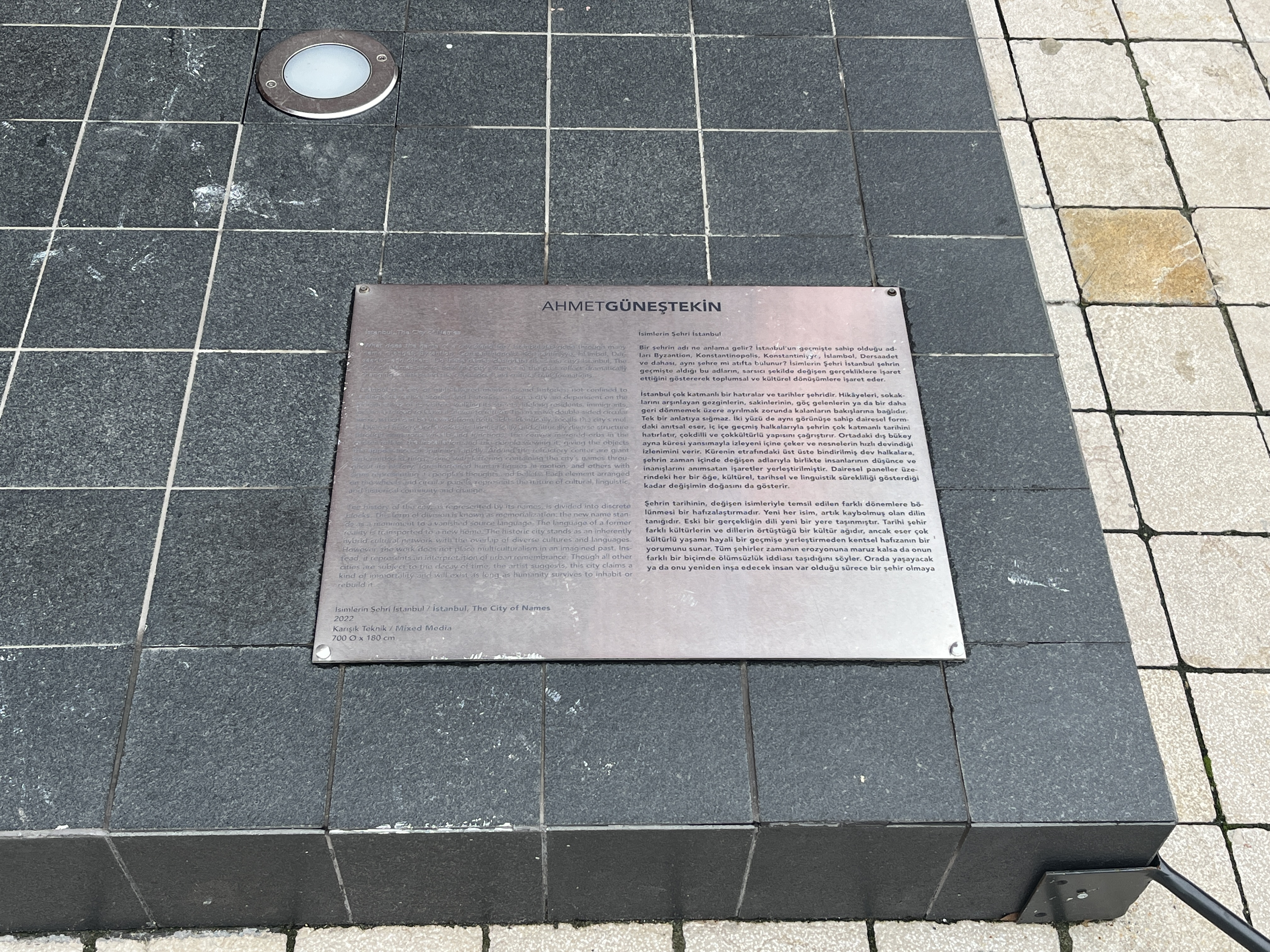
Plaque
