= Atif Akin =

Turkish-born artist and designer

Atif Akin (born 1979, Bandırma, Turkey) is a Turkish-born artist, designer, and educator whose work explores intersections of science, nature, mobility, and politics through a technoscientific lens. He is currently an Associate Professor at the Department of Art & Design at the Mason Gross School of the Arts, Rutgers University in New Jersey, United States.

== Early life and education ==
Akin earned a B.S. in Chemical Engineering and an M.Sc. in Industrial Design from Middle East Technical University (METU) in Ankara, Turkey. His educational background in both science and design informs his interdisciplinary artistic practice.

== Academic and professional career ==
Akin began his academic career teaching in Istanbul, Europe, and the United States. From 2006 to 2011, he was on the faculty at Istanbul Bilgi University, directing the MFA in Visual Communication Design. In 2011, he joined Rutgers University and has since contributed to the development of the MFA in Design program. He has worked across disciplines and served as a fellow at Rutgers' Center for Cultural Analysis.

== Artistic practice ==
Akin’s work spans data visualization, immersive installation, and media theory, addressing themes like radiation, digital culture, and political memory. His projects include:

- Mutant Space (2010–2020), a research-based series on nuclear mobility.
- Mutant Time (2022), a survey work on radiation and archaeology, 17th Istanbul Biennial.
- Tepoto Sud morph Moruroa (2019), exhibited in Singapore, France, and Sweden.
- Apricots from Damascus (2015), zine and exhibition project co-produced by SALT and apexart.
- O (2024), a site-specific installation in Istanbul, part of Ars Electronica.
- Teaching a GAN the Alphabet (2024), Istanbul Modern.
- Ptolemy (2022), commissioned by Michigan State and Princeton Universities.
- Empire Front (2014), focused on surveillance and war.
- Uncharted (2009), a curated exhibition and publication at SantralIstanbul, co-curated in cooperation with ZKM.

His work is included in the Younger Than Jesus artist directory by the New Museum.

== Exhibitions ==
Akin’s work has featured in over 40 exhibitions internationally. Selected:

- Mutant Time, 17th Istanbul Biennial (2022)
- Signals, Pilot Gallery, Istanbul (2024)
- Teaching a GAN the Alphabet, Istanbul Modern (2024)
- O, Ars Electronica, Austria (2024)
- Tepoto Sud morph Moruroa, BASE Gallery, Royal Institute of Art, Le Fresnoy (2018–19)
- The Oceanic, NTU CCA, Singapore (2017)
- Tidalectics, TBA21, Vienna (2017)
- Apricots from Damascus, SALT Galata, Istanbul (2015)
- Empire Front, Columbia University & CUNY (2014–2016)

== Teaching and service ==
At Rutgers, Akin teaches courses on design, digital media, computation, and research methods. He has advised MFA and undergraduate theses, developed the MFA in Design curriculum, and organized interdisciplinary collaborations on Critical AI and design research.

== Publications and press ==
His work is featured in Tidalectics (MIT Press), Greenlight - An Artistic Workshop (Sternberg Press), Climates. Habitats. Environments. (MIT Press), and others.
