= Nevzat Sayın =

Turkish architect

- Born: 1954 (age 71–72); Dörtyol, Hatay, Turkey
- Education: Ege University
- Occupation: Architect
- Awards: Ulusal Mimarlık Ödülleri (1992, 1996, 1998); ArkiPARC Real Estate Awards (2008)
- Practice: Nevzat Sayın Mimarlık Hizmetleri (founded 1985)
- Projects: Gön Leather Factory; Kızılbel Houses; Göksu Office; Yahşibey Houses
- Website: nsmh.com.tr

Nevzat Sayın (born 1954 in Hatay, Dörtyol) is a Turkish architect and author known for his modern yet contextually grounded approach to design. A graduate of Ege University, he founded Nevzat Sayın Mimarlık Hizmetleri in 1985 and has since completed numerous residential, industrial, and educational projects. Sayın has received several Ulusal Mimarlık Ödülleri (National Architecture Awards of Turkey), ArkiPARC Real Estate Awards, and has been nominated for the Aga Khan Award for Architecture.

== Early life ==
He was educated at Ege University. He began post-graduate studies at Ege, but did not complete them. He worked with Cengiz Bektaş for after school education.

== Career ==
He started his own architecture firm in 1985. He received Serbest Mimarlar Ödülü. He was nominated for the Ağa Han Architectural Awards. He wrote many architectural writings and he gave many interviews.

== List of Works ==
- Gön Leather Factory—Gön is a structure which has been middle of the shantytown and it remains for a long time. For the structure he considered this speciality of the area. The important things are explicitness and not going to lose its impact.
- Beyaz Ev
- Çakalini
- Kızılbel Evleri—Employs materials such clay brick and dotune that can be used in future projects. The units are built with local structure methods. Units are designed as one with some distance between them. The buildings that are for guests and owners are separate. Dining and kitchen areas are shared. The pool is also separate.
- Göksu Ofis—A building by the water. The building is like a boat between the water and the curvilinear street behind it. The building is close to the street. The facade that faces the water is completely open. It is treated with a wooden grill that protects the privacy of the inside. The building stands between boat and pier recalls.
- Yahşibey Evleri—Nevaz Sayın says, "We put a rule to ourselves just at the beginning. We was going to make like its been made from years but we were going to make it better. We decided the borders and we let the worker decide how to make it.we tried to find something new in the routine. It was an important factor in the similarizing demand that this house had no distance from the houses surrounding it.

"I don't know what is the difference and similarities but it is like our homes also it isn't. This is the villagers words. This words claim that the idea was successful. In this specialities we think that the house got the point to be a stranger and familiar."

== Released Books ==
- Nevzat Sayın: Düşler, Düşünceler, İşler 1990–2004, Yapı Kredi Yayınları
- Nevzat Sayın: Bir Yapı Kitabı, Umur Yayınları
- Nevzat Sayın: Coğrafi Bir Mesele Olarak Mimarlık, Yapı Kredi Yayınları

== Project Rewards ==
- ArkiPARC Gayrimenkul Ödülü, Konut - Yeni Gelişme Kategorisi Ödülü, (Evidea Konutları, 2008)
- ArkiPARC Gayrimenkul Ödülü, Finalist, (Tepe Narcity Konut Yerleşkesi, 2008)
- ArkiPARC Gayrimenkul Ödülü, Kamusal Proje Kategorisi Ödülü, (Santralistanbul Kültür ve Eğitim Merkezi Yerleşkesi, 2008)
- Ulusal Mimarlık Ödülleri, Yapı Dalı - Başarı Ödülü, (Tekirdağ'da Ev, 1998)
- Ulusal Mimarlık Ödülleri, Yapı Dalı - Başarı Ödülü, (Gön II. Bina, 1996)
- Ulusal Mimarlık Ödülleri, Yapı Dalı - Başarı Ödülü, (Gön I. Bina, 1992)

== Publications ==
- Profil:Nevzat Sayın (Arredamento Mimarlık, Atilla Yücel, İhsan Bilgin, Uğur Tanyeli, 12/2000)
- Kendisi Gibi (Hillsider, Ebru Tabak, 09/2000)
- Nevzat Sayın: White House as Void, Emre Senan House, Architect's Studio (A+U, 07/2000)
- Beton, Rüzgar ve Su (Marie Claire Maison, Elvan Ernid, 06/2000)
- Mimarlık Ödüllü Bir Beyaz Ev (Address, Handan Alanlıoğlu, 05/2000)
- Tabakalı Ahşap Teknolojisi İle İlginç Bir Uygulama İstanbul (Yapı, Vedat Tokyay, 02/1999)
- Buildings for Production of Thermoplastic... (Architecture Skopje, 00/1999)
- Söyleşi: Çok Yönlü Bir Mimar: Nevzat Sayın (Marie Claire Maison, Meltem Cansever, 12/1998)
- Irmak Anaokulu (Arredamento Mimarlık, Atilla Yücel, 06/1998)
- Yapı Merkezi Prefabrikasyon Ürünleri İle Model Ev Mimari Tasarım:Nevzat Sayın (Yapı, Ülkü Arıoğlu, 07/1997)
- Shell General Headquarters, Gön Leather Factory, Vefateks Faktory Mosque (An Architectural Guide, 00/1997)
- Nevzat Sayın (Architects in the World, 00/1995)
- Ödüllü Bir Fabrika Binası (Vizyon Dekorasyon, 07/1993)
- Borovalıların Yeniköy'deki Evi (Vizyon Dekorasyon, 05/1993)

== Sources ==
- NSMH. "NSMH". nsmh.com.
- Murat Şahin. "Mimarın Şizofren Hali". blogspot.com.tr.
- Arkitera Mimarlık Merkezi. "Nevzat Sayın". Arkitera.com.
- "Nevzat Sayın". arkiv.com.tr.
