= Gültepe, Kağıthane =

Neighborhood in Istanbul, Turkey

Gültepe
- Neighbourhood
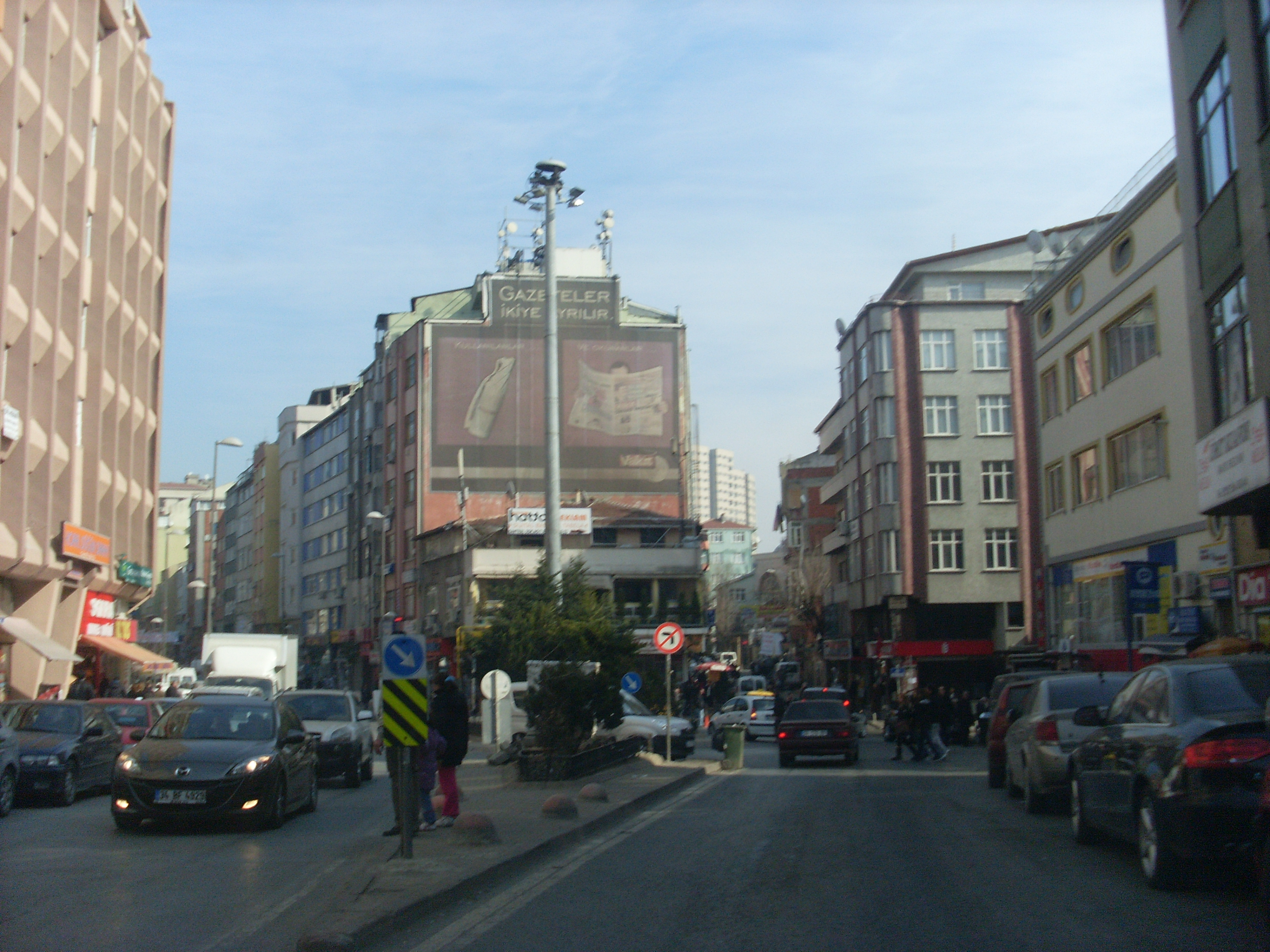
- Ortabayır Square

- Location within Turkey Location within Istanbul
- Coordinates: 41°04′44″N 28°59′38″E
- Country: Turkey
- Province: Istanbul
- District: Kağıthane
- Population (2022): 14,542
- Time zone: UTC+3 (TRT)

Gültepe is a neighbourhood in the municipality and district of Kağıthane, Istanbul Province, Turkey. Its population is 14,542 (2022).

== Gallery ==
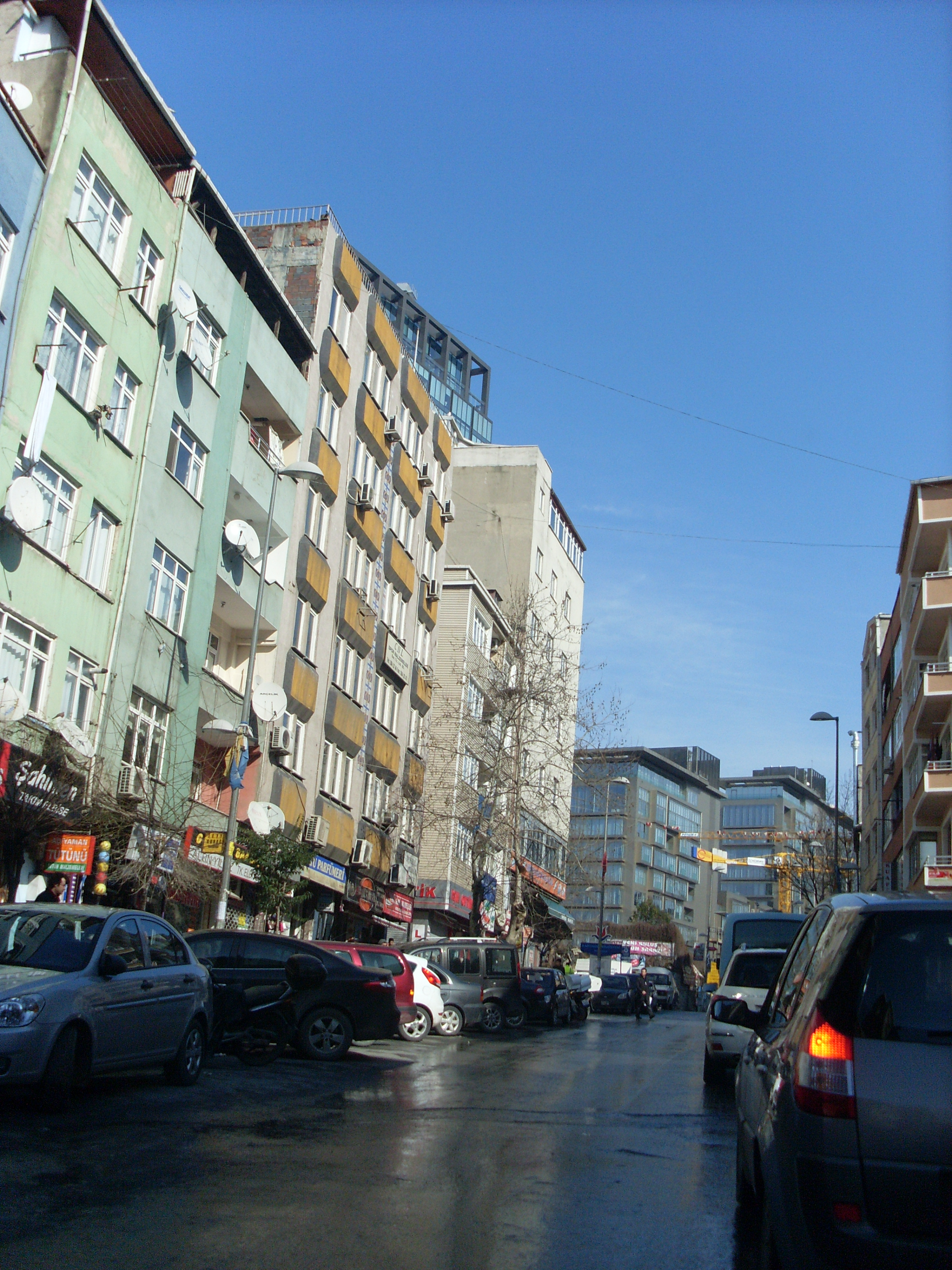
Gültepe, Talatpasa Street

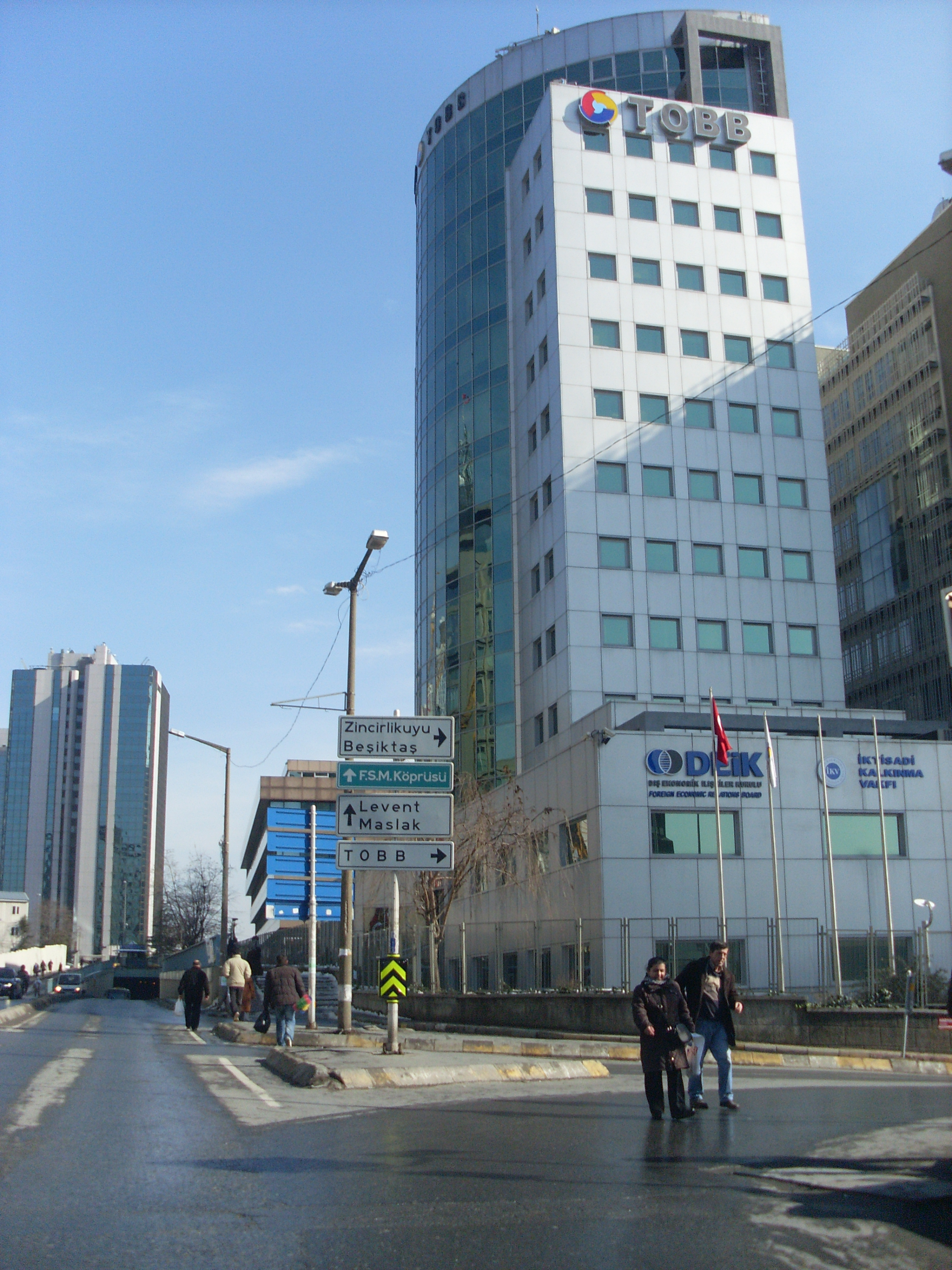
Gültepe,Talatpaşa Street (February,2012)

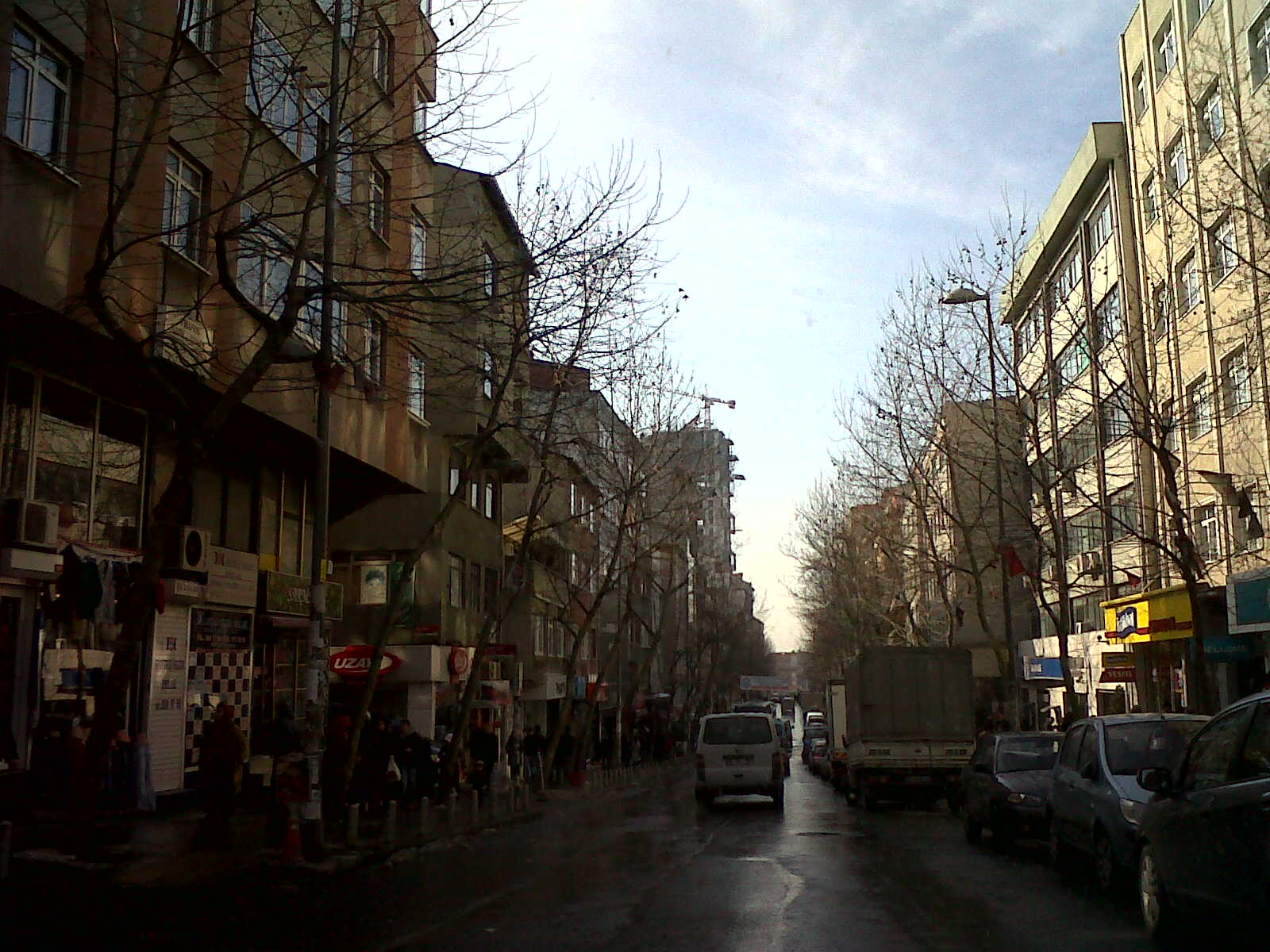
Gültepe,Talatpaşa Street (2012)

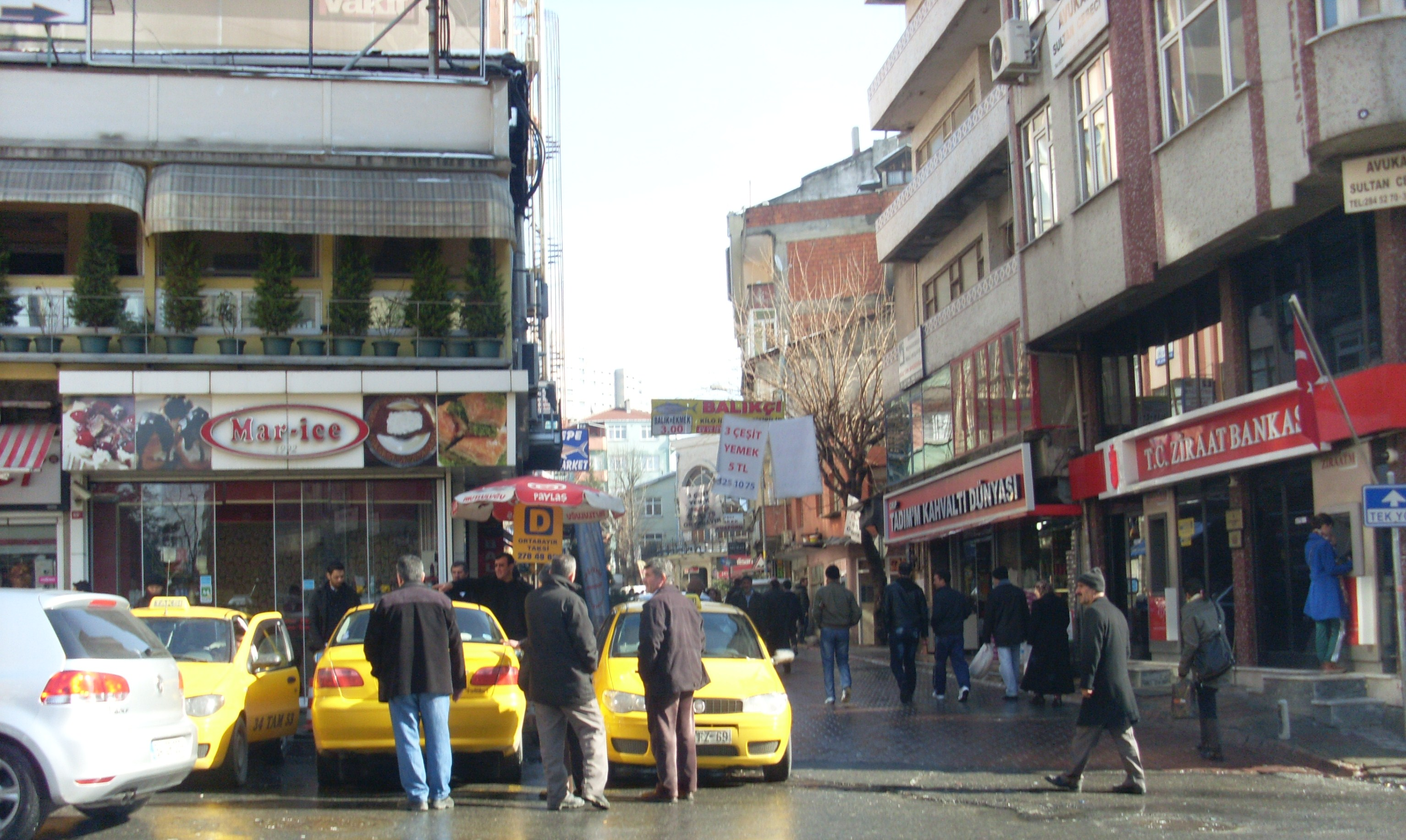
Gültepe,Ortabayır

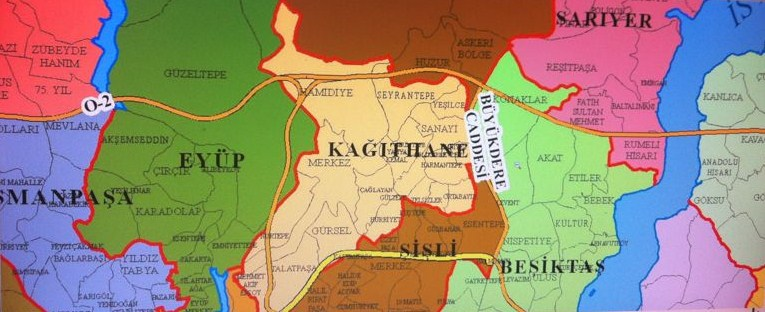
Location of Kağıthane in Istanbul
