= SantralIstanbul =

santralistanbul

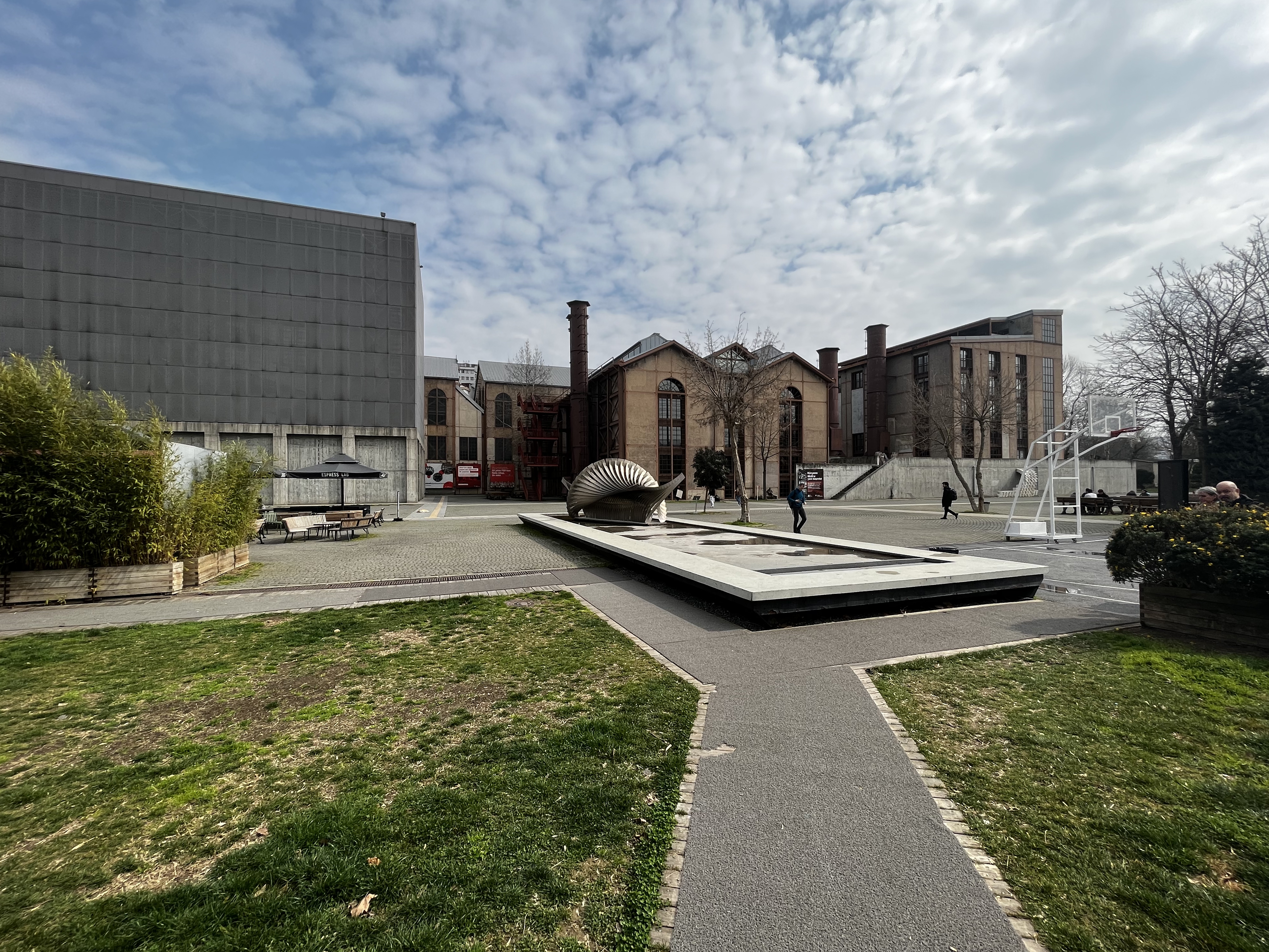
- SantralIstanbul exterior

- Location of SantralIstanbul in Istanbul
- Established: 2007
- Location: Eyüp, Istanbul, Turkey
- Coordinates: 41.0665°N 28.9461°E
- Type: Art museum, Energy museum
- Website: www.santralistanbul.org

The santralistanbul (Turkish: santralistanbul), opened in 2007, is an arts and cultural complex located at the upper end of Golden Horn where two small rivers, Alibeyköy and Kağıthane meet in the Eyüp district of Istanbul, Turkey. The center, consisting of an energy museum, an amphitheater, concert halls and a public library, is situated within the Silahtarağa campus of Istanbul Bilgi University that was formerly the first power station of the Ottoman Empire.

Arts, cultural, educational and social buildings of santralistanbul, having an area of 118,000 m^{2}, are all housed in the facilities of the former Silahtarağa Power Station, which served from 1914 to 1983 for supplying Istanbul with electric power. The site is named after the Turkish word "santral" for power plant.

== History of the power station ==
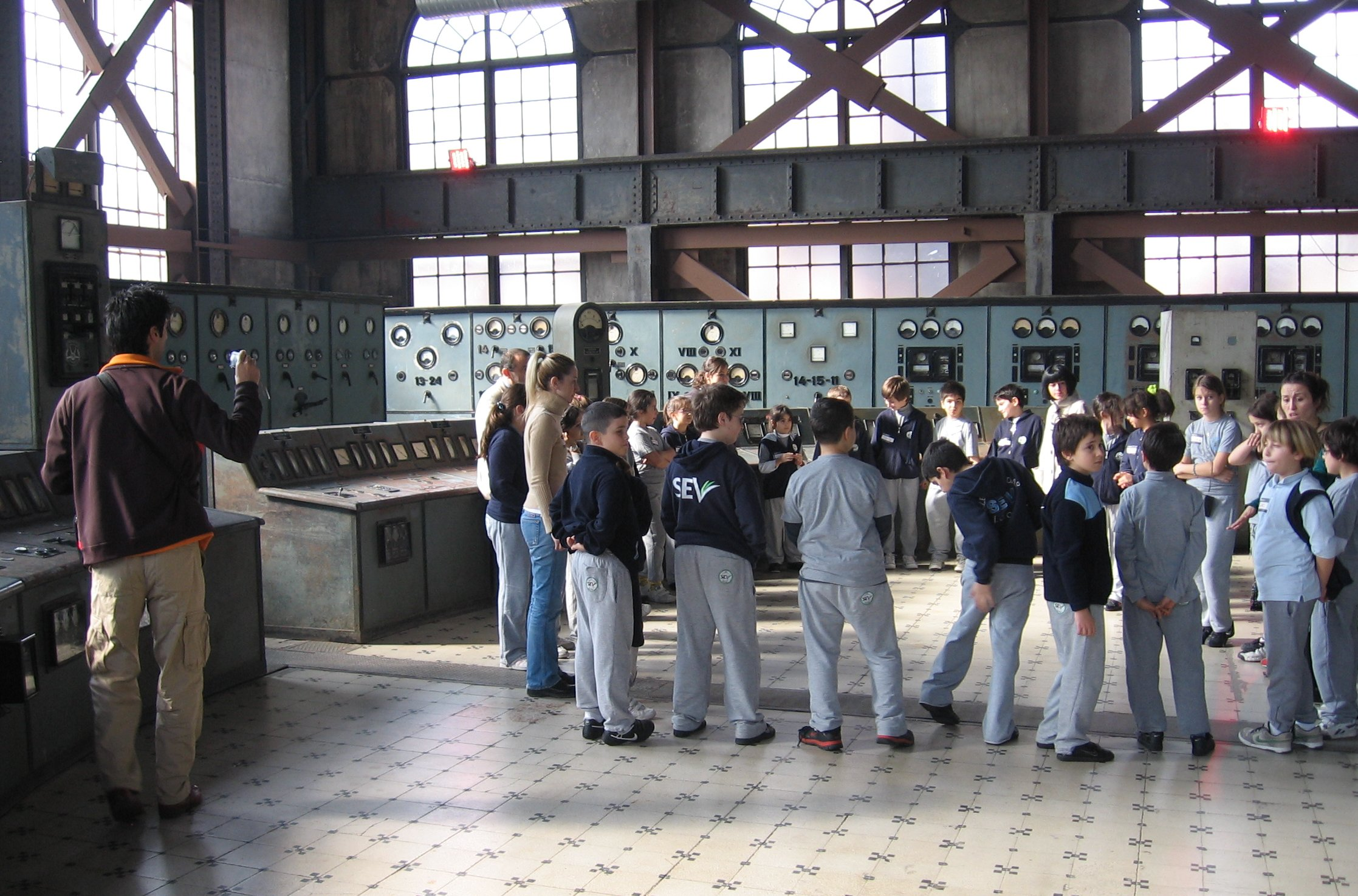
Energy museum - Control room

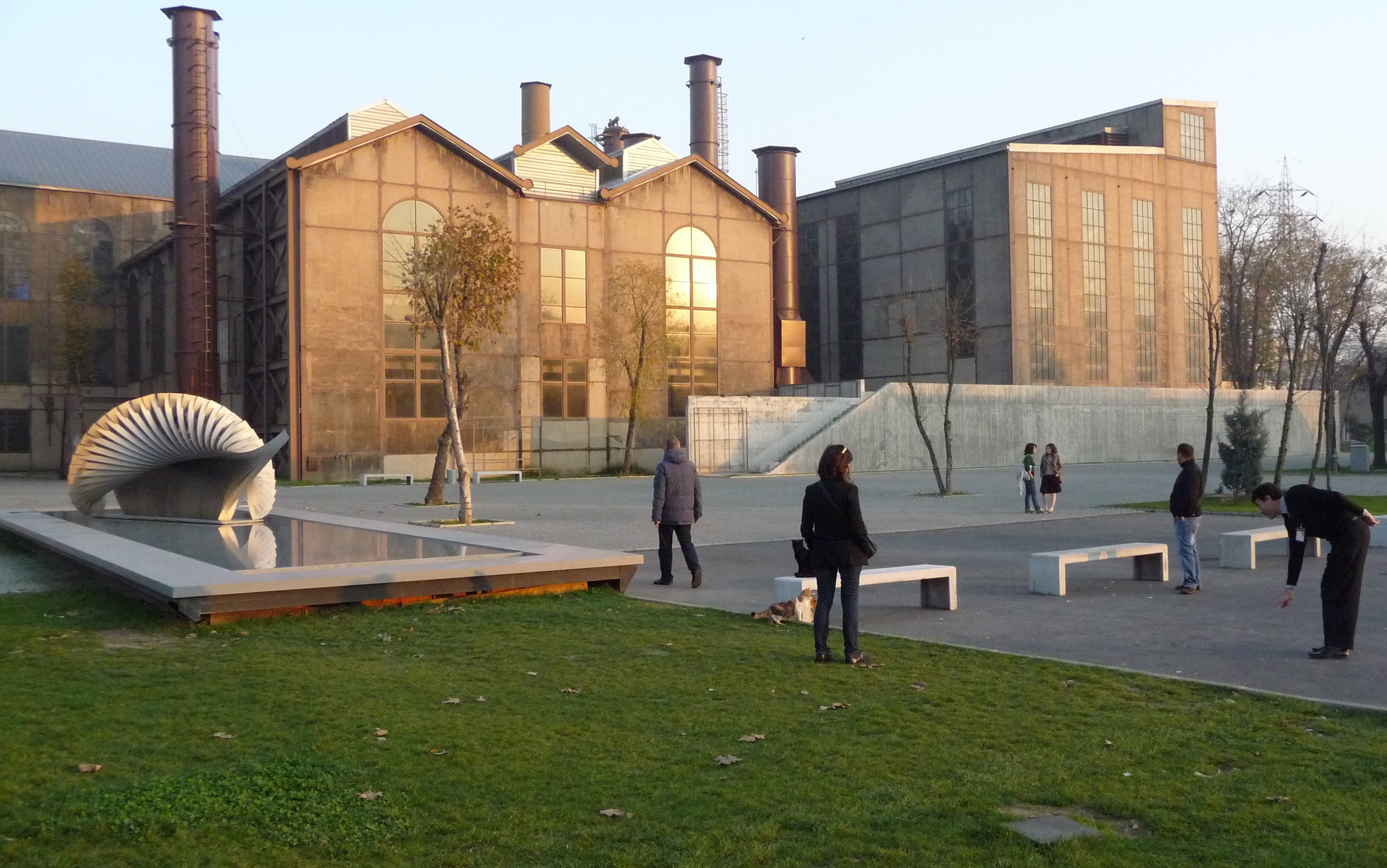
SantralIstanbul, 2009

== Redevelopment project ==
The redevelopment plan was initiated by Oğuz Özerden, a young businessman and founder of Istanbul Bilgi University. He succeeded to persuade Erdoğan's government, and finally obtained the rights from the Ministry of Energy and Natural Resources to establish and administer a cultural complex and its third campus on the site of the former power plant. The related protocol foreseeing the transfer for a 20-years term was signed on May 1, 2004, at the Khedive Palace in Istanbul.

A lawsuit was filed by the Chamber of Electrical Engineers' Istanbul branch, which had developed 2001 a plan with Istanbul Technical University to establish an electro-techno park. However, the Ministry of Energy preferred the project of Istanbul Bilgi University.

The project's concept is similar to the Tate Modern in London, however, it is much more comprehensive as it comprises a technology museum, an amphitheater, concert halls, a public library and residencies for visiting artists. The redevelopment project was realized in Istanbul Bilgi University's partnership with Doğuş Group, Ciner Group and Laureate Education, Inc., with the main sponsorship provided by Kale Group and the City of Istanbul. The cost of the project exceeded US$45m, exceeding the original budgeted of US$30m.

İhsan Bilgin, Dean of the School of Architecture at Istanbul Bilgi University, was responsible for the architectural coordination, while the master plan was carried out by the architects Nevzat Sayın (public library) and Emre Arolat (multi-purpose hall). Han Tümertekin joined the team for the design work on the energy museum. The architectural work was completed in three years. Some parts of the complex are still under construction.

SantralIstanbul's preliminary opening was held on July 17, 2007, with Prime Minister Erdoğan present. Three exhibitions of overseas artists were shown. Visiting hours during this period were limited between 19.00 through 23.00 hours due to ongoing construction works at the site.

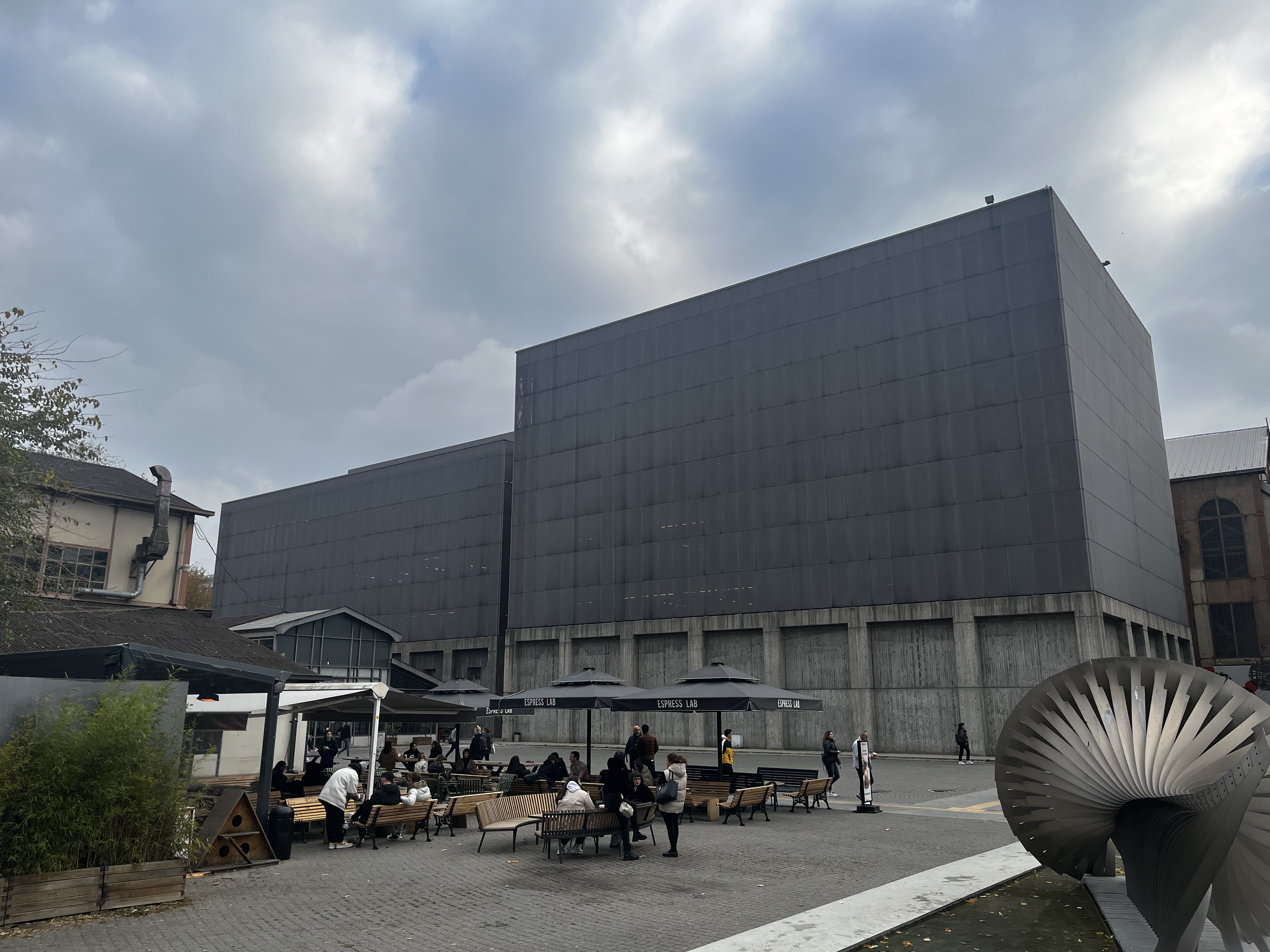
Modern Art Museum

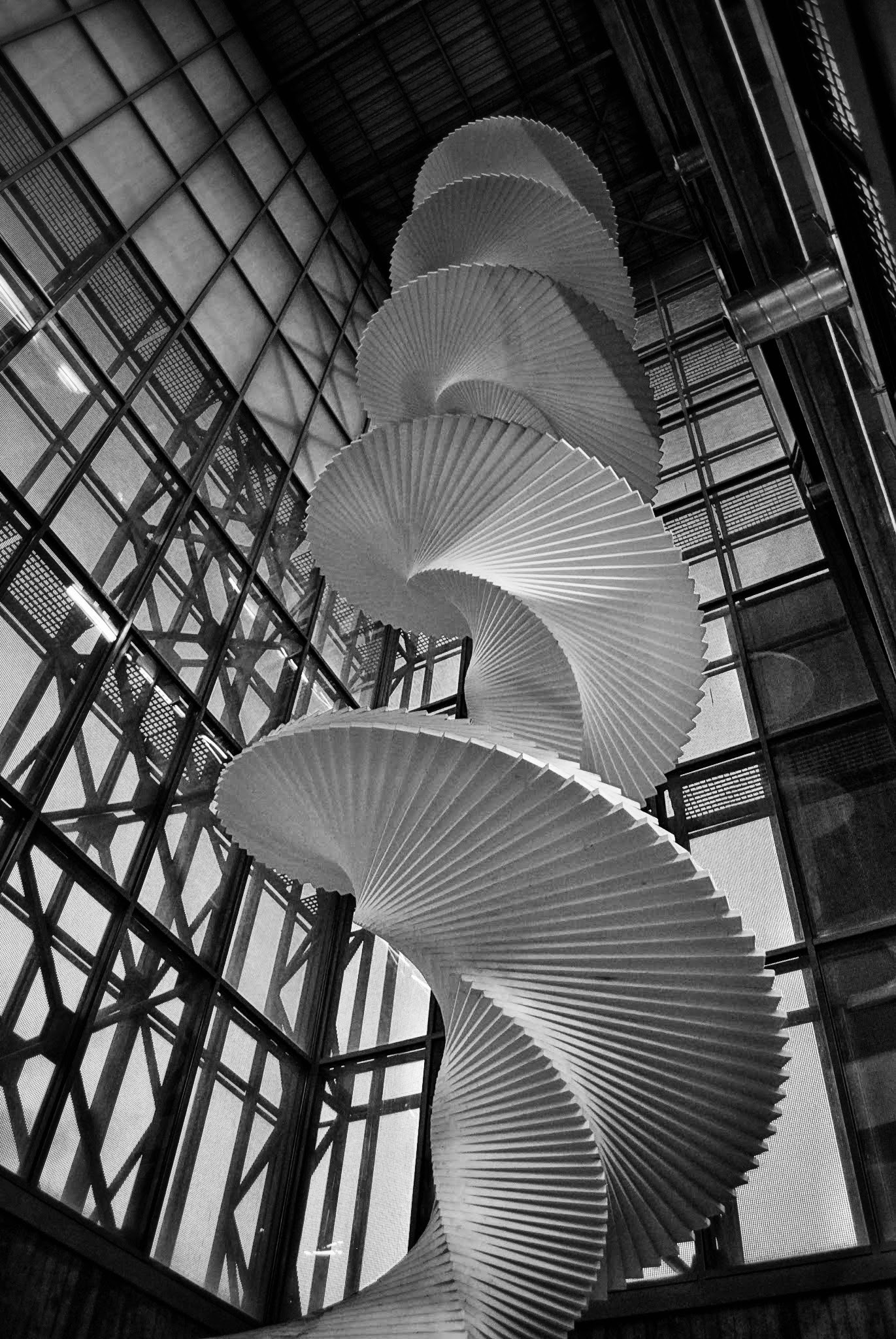
Modern Art Museum

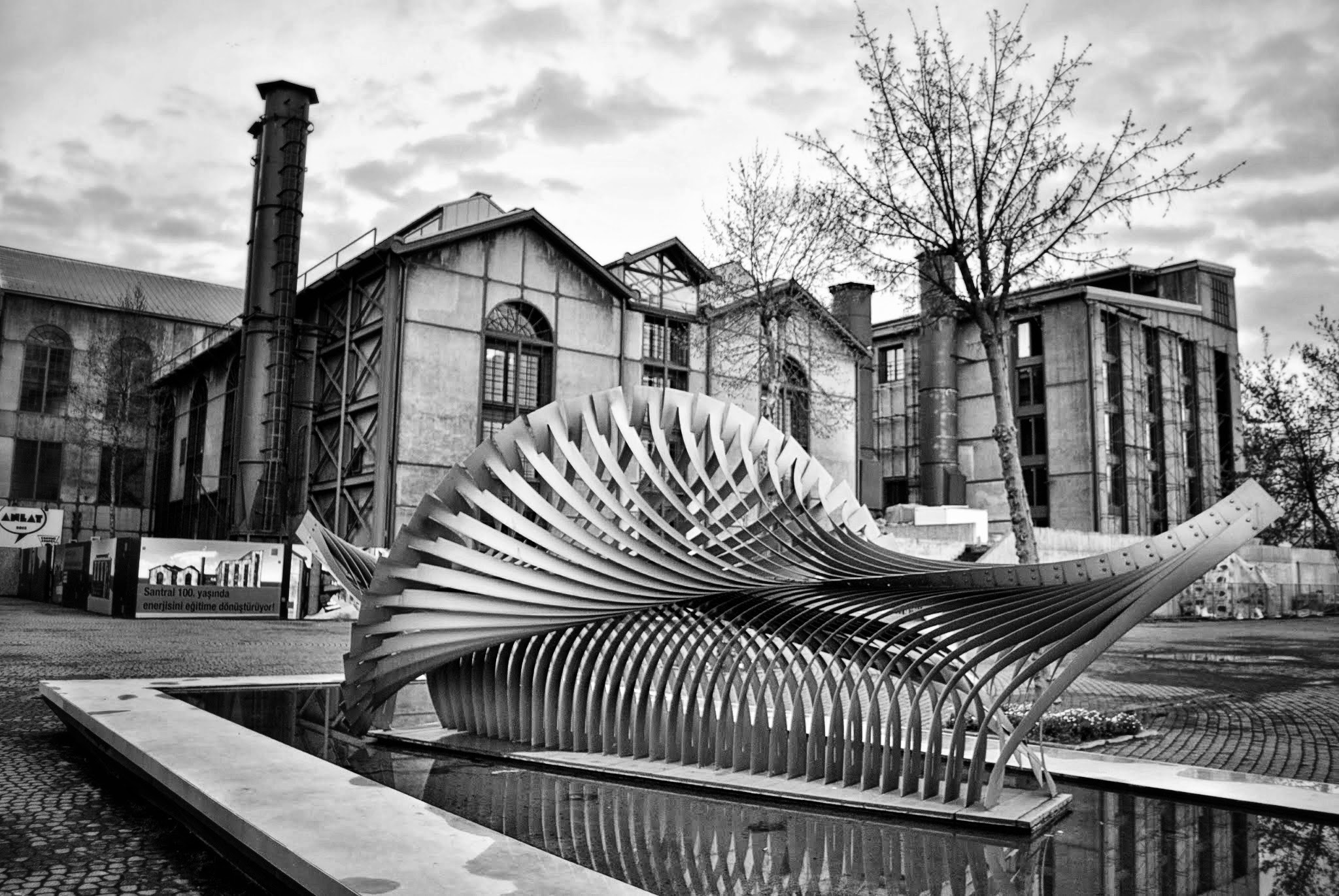
Modern Art Museum

The official opening took place on September 8, 2007. It is expected that around 1.5 million people will visit SantralIstanbul. Former directors were Serhan Ada and Kerim Goknel. As of 2012, the complex has been run by Istanbul Bilgi University Board.

== Legal Framework ==
The industrial structure, one of the works of the late Ottoman period and the early modernity of the Republic, was registered with the decision numbered 2532 of 1991 of the Istanbul I Numbered Cultural and Natural Heritage Protection Board of the Ministry of Culture. Since the boiler rooms, engine rooms, cooling water channels, coal installation (power plant), residences, local transformer building, and two bridges over the Alibeyköy (Silahtar) stream form a whole with both their architecture and equipment, it was decided to include them in the scope of protection. The buildings in this area were given the function of 'Industrial Museum.' These areas were re-planned as an industrial museum and educational structure. After that, the Eyüp Municipality's proposal for a cultural facility (Industrial Museum, Technology and Science Center) dated 10.01.2002 was accepted by the Istanbul Metropolitan Municipality, and it was decided by the Istanbul Metropolitan Municipality to re-function it for cultural purposes.

== Modern art museum ==
The Modern art museum, with 7,000 m^{2} floorspace, consists of two new buildings constructed upon the foundations of two old power plants. Only a wall and some small foundations had survived. The architects developed the new buildings based on the original dimensions of the old power plants, using old photographs showing the steam generating water-tube boiler section of the power plant.

The 5-story reinforced concrete buildings are clad in steel and glass facades. The two buildings are connected with a glass passage. The galleries are separated with mobile drywalls. The facades of the buildings are covered with aluminium mesh, which allows light to enter during the day, whilst creating a lantern-like effect at night. The building facades can also be used as a projection screen. Today, the building is no longer an art museum. It has been transformed into an educational complex filled with classrooms.

The white and gray colors preferred on the floor and wall surfaces in the interior of the museum allowed for a neutral effect to be created inside the historical facility. In this way, the new structures added to the historical texture did not overshadow the old ones and did not harm the visibility of the historical accumulation. The neutrality of the structure also contributed to the visibility of the works to be exhibited in the interior. Nevzat Sayın explained this situation with the following words:

“We were going to either build the same old structures or a brand-new building. We tried to find a middle way. It would not be useful to build the same one that was finished. It was not appropriate for a new structure to create a third language and compete with the others. We designed structures as neutral as possible.”

=== Temporary exhibitions ===
- "Modern Aspects" from Centre Pompidou in Paris, France (July 17, 2007–July 26, 2007) - 1st floor
- "Touch me Istanbul", digital art from ZKM in Karlsruhe, Germany (July 17, 2007–July 26, 2007) - 2nd floor
- "An Interpersonal Journey" selected videos from MUSAC in León, Spain (July 17, 2007–July 26, 2007) - 3rd floor
- "Light, Illumination, & Electricity", supported by the Anna Lindh Foundation (ALF) in collaboration with the Townhouse Gallery of Contemporary Art (Cairo, Egypt), ZINC – ECM de la Friche Belle de Mai (Marseille, France), NOMAD (Istanbul) and SCCA Ljubljana in Ljubljana, Slovenia (September 1, 2007–November 30, 2007)
- 10th Istanbul Biennial, film festival (September 8, 2007–November 2, 2007)
- "Mahrem", videos, photographies, plastics and installation of 9 artists from 6 countries on women's head and body covering in Islam (October 17, 2007–November 21, 2007)
- "Modern and Beyond", 450 artworks of 100 Turkish artists from 1950 to 2000 (September 8, 2007–February 29, 2008)
- "Assorted Cocktail" by Martin Parr (July 17, 2008–October 30, 2008)
- "Uncharted: User Frames in Media Arts", contemporary artworks involving the large-scale use of digital and interactive media, (21 March-16 August 2009), co-curated by Peter Weibel, Bernhard Serexhe and Atif Akin
- Kesişimler-Dönüşümler (English: Intersections-Transformations) by Ahmet Güneştekin, Istanbul (March 1, 2012)

=== Notable contributing artists ===
- Shahram Entekhabi
- Shadi Ghadirian
- Ahmet Güneştekin
- Sarkis Zabunyan

== Energy museum ==
The Energy Museum, offers visitors a historical accumulation of energy production, one of the vital elements of our age. The museum is considered one of the concrete symbols of industrial heritage. The transformation of the engine rooms, which are on the verge of decay due to neglect, into a museum is an important step in terms of establishing a bond with the past and transferring the historical accumulation to future generations. Scaffolding and steps have been added to the interior space in order to ensure circulation within the museum. It is aimed at showing visitors all stages of energy production. Mechanical equipment that is no longer usable creates an artificial interior landscape within the building.

== Public library and Faculty of Architecture ==
Two of the boiler rooms, standing side by side, were combined and turned into a Library and the faculty of architecture. There are two old boilers that have survived and have a protection order in place, in both areas. These boilers underwent special treatments and were preserved in their original state. The form of the new structure was determined by the carriers of the old boilers, and the two buildings were combined with the entrance spaces on the ground floors. The workshops, exhibition and jury spaces of the Faculty of Architecture were designed to support the principle of openness in the structure.

The existing building shell, which was constructed as a thin envelope only to protect the boilers, was reconsidered to provide appropriate building physics conditions while re-functioning the buildings. A new wall-joinery system was introduced behind the existing exterior façade, suitable for façade openings and newly created flooring, providing new and comfortable conditions. The interior spaces, enriched with gallery spaces that support the open space set up within the possibilities of the steel structure implemented in line with the reinforcements made in 2006, helped to capture the spirit of the existing structure.

The public library is scheduled to open in 2008. The facility, the biggest library in Turkey, will be able to serve around 1,000 people at the same time and open to late hours in the night every day.

== Multi-purpose halls ==
A new building is planned for multi-purpose halls, which is still in-planning state.

== Educational buildings ==
The educational buildings were created by transforming the depot, restaurant, workshop and lodging structures belonging to the power plant. The structures, whose main carrier system is reinforced concrete, were supported by steel structures and large glass openings were used. The aim is not to break the connection between the inside and outside. The starting point of the design was that the structures created for education should not stand out among other buildings with historical texture. For this reason, the structures were designed in simple language.

According to Nevzat Sayın, there is no new educational structure that has been built where there was no previous structure. A significant portion of the new structures are educational structures consisting of four blocks. The structures are built on an axis layout of 7.5 x 7.5 m. This measurement was derived from both the measurements of old traces and new needs. Construction was finalized with data of flexibility, divisibility, large class needs and academic rooms. Since its first opening, quite a few changes have been made, and it has been able to carry out these changes.

== Residents for artists ==
It was expected that annually around 1,000 scholarships as artists, architects, designers, philosophers, scientists and specialists for various areas of culture will stay at the residents within the complex. But today the residency program is no longer available.

== Cafes and restaurant ==
There are three cafes in the center. A chain restaurant called "Otto Santral" turns into a discothèque in the late night hours and also hosts different events and live music. But after the new regulations on alcohol, Otto had to close down. Today the same space hosts a new restaurant called Papaz, which doesn't serve alcohol.

== Admission and transport ==
A shuttle bus service free of charge is provided for the visitors departing from Kabatas pier, Trump Shopping Mall and the Dolapdere campus.

Address:
Eski Silahtarağa Elektrik Santrali (Former Silahtarağa Power Station)
Silahtar Mah. Kazım Karabekir Cad. 1
Eyüp-Istanbul
