= Silahtarağa Power Station =

Museum in Turkey

Coordinates: 41°4′2″N 28°56′45″E

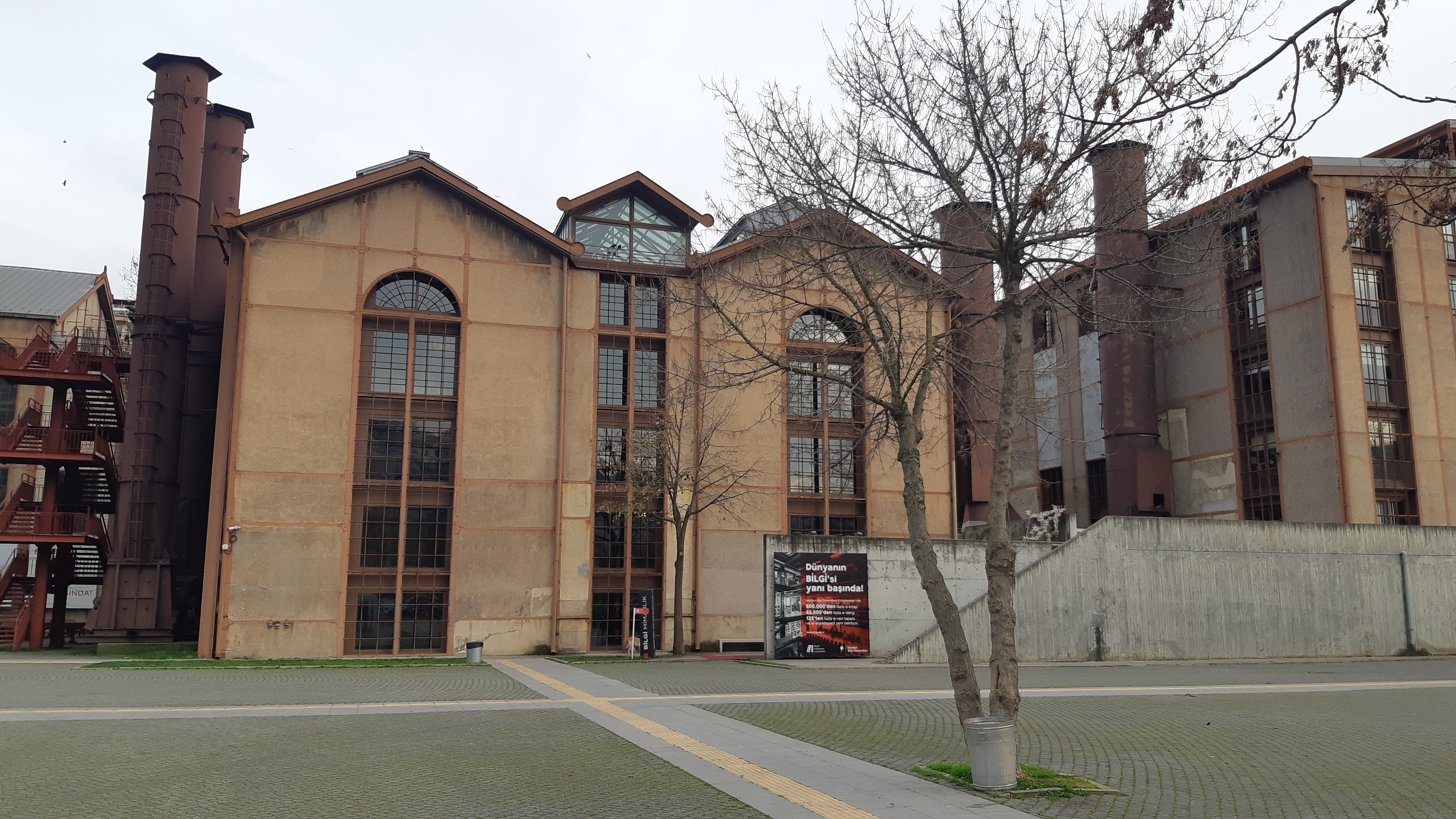
One of the buildings of the old power station, which is now housing SantralIstanbul

The Silahtarağa Power Station (Turkish: Silahtarağa Elektrik Santralı) was a coal-fired electric power generating station located in Istanbul Turkey. The Ottoman Empire's first urban-scaled power plant, it was in use from 1914 to 1983. The site has since been converted into a university campus for the Istanbul Bilgi University and houses two museums and several facilities. It was refurbished and renamed SantralIstanbul in 2007.

== History ==
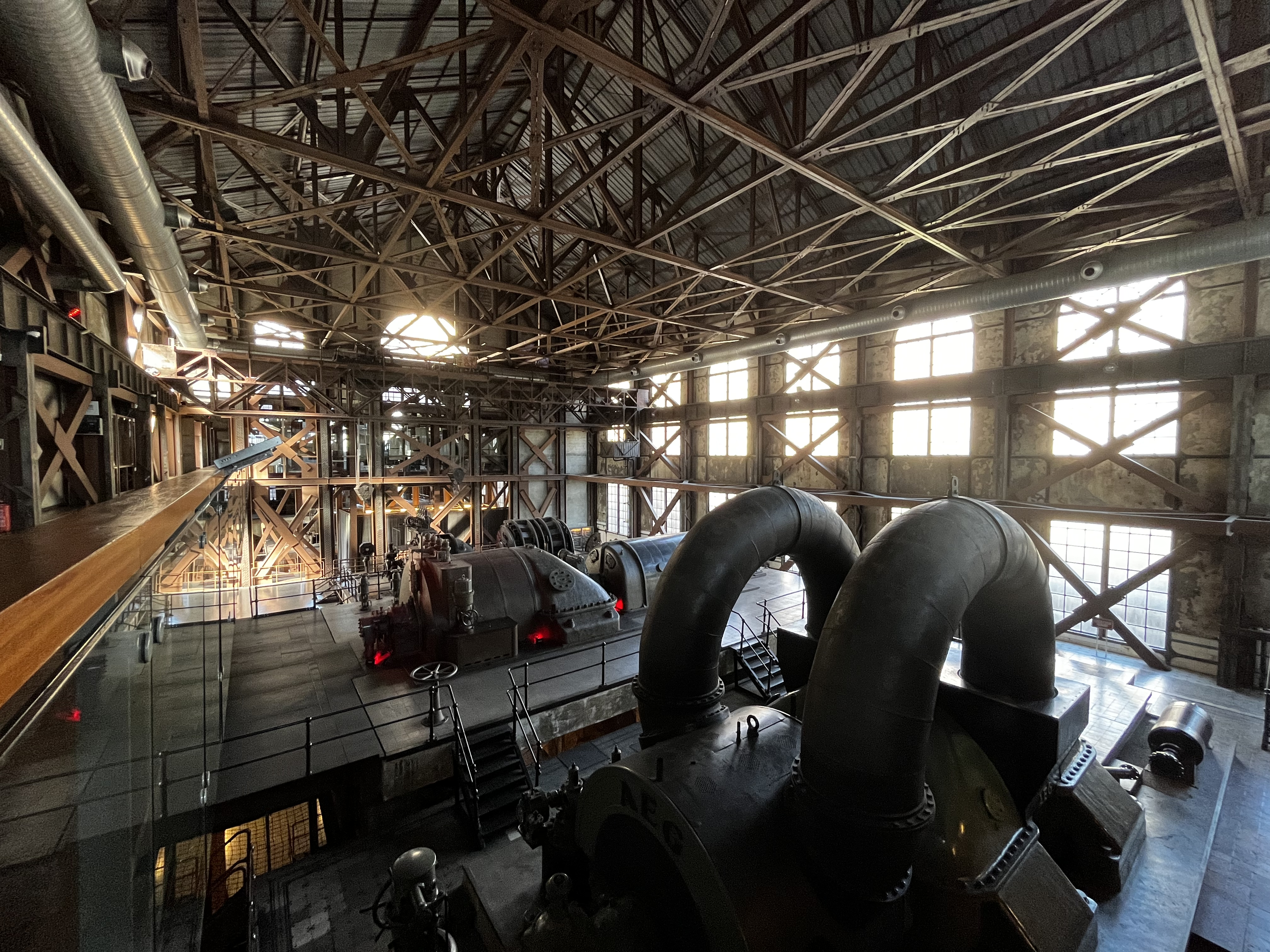
One of the buildings of the old power station, which is now housing SantralIstanbul

The power plant was designed as the first in the Ottoman Empire, apart from a small hydroelectric power station built in 1902 outside Tarsus in Anatolia. The Budapest based Austro-Hungarian Gas and Electric Company, Ganz, was contracted to build the power station. In 1910 the firm had established the Ottoman Electric Company in cooperation with the Belgian bank Banque de Bruxelles and the Austro-Hungarian bank Banque Générale Hongroise de Crédit. The company obtained an imperial concession lasting 50 years, and built the coal-fired power plant in the Silahtarağa neighbourhood of Eyüp district, at the upper end of the Golden Horn.

The power plant started service on February 11, 1914. It supplied power initially to Istanbul's tram network and a short time later to Dolmabahçe Palace, the Sultan's residence on the Bosporus strait. Before long, electrical power was prevalent in the city's more prosperous districts as well.

The foreign-owned company was nationalized in 1937 and turned over to the Municipality of Istanbul on July 1, 1938, and its management was assigned to the Electricity, Tunnel and Tram Company of Istanbul (IETT). Silahtarağa power station was the sole electricity producer in Istanbul until the 1950s. In 1952, the station was linked to the newly created Turkish national grid. From 1962 it was operated by Etibank and in 1970 its control was passed to the Turkish Electric Institution (TEK).

The Silahtarağa power station initially had three 6 MW generators. This capacity was later increased to 80 MW.

On March 13, 1983, Silahtarağa power station was shut down because it was no longer economical to operate. The plant was left largely derelict for the next 20 years.

In 1991, the plant was listed as a "cultural and natural heritage of Istanbul", giving it special protection.

== Redevelopment project ==
In 2002, a redevelopment plan was drawn up by Oğuz Özerden, a young businessman and the founder of Istanbul Bilgi University. The project aimed to convert the former plant into a university campus. Under this plan, the former station buildings would be used to house two new museums: A gallery dedicated to modern art, and an energy museum.

It was this blueprint which received official backing. An alternative project was submitted by the Istanbul branch of the Chamber of Electrical Engineers in cooperation with the Istanbul Technical University. Bilgi University's project was approved by the Ministry of Energy and Natural Resources, and was realized in three years with the financial support of some leading Turkish companies.

The complex was renamed SantralIstanbul, derived from the Turkish word "Santral", which means power station. The complex was officially opened on September 8, 2007. Alongside the art gallery and energy museum, the university has established a public library, amphitheatre, and several smaller facilities for art, cultural events and educational institutions.

== The Energy Museum at Santralİstanbul ==
The remaining equipments of the power plant are preserved as part of the display at the SantralIstanbul energy museum. It was integrated into the design by architect Han Tümertekin. Situated in the turbine hall with three generator groups, the museum is a collection of the steam turbines, the electrical generators and the equipment of the former Silahtarağa power plant, on display in almost their original conditions.

Tours are self-guided. Here, modern glass escalators replaced the former coal conveyors between the floors. In order to have a good overview of the machinery in the huge hall, a podium hanged at a height of 12 meters leads the visitors to the control room. After the control room, the tour route returns to the entrance by way of the turbine hall floor.

The podium has a rough wooden floor and glass sides framed in steel. The control room is preserved nearly in its original form, and was only cleaned.

The lower level of the technical museum has also moving exhibits, where the visitors are encouraged to push buttons and work levers for interactive learning.

The original relay and control instrumentation and wiring are visible. There are many examples from dozens of former and existing manufacturers. The large size and scale of the equipment and devices, which were once necessary to generate only a few dozen Megawatts, are among the notable and impressive features of the museum.

== Admission and transport ==
The museum is open to the public from 10:00 to 22:00 every day except Mondays. Admission is free of charge.

Parking and pedestrian access is from the south, immediately after the Kağıthane Bridge. Pedestrian access is also possible from the north, adjacent to Fil Köprusü (Alibey Elephant Bridge), which permits foot and bike access from Eyüp and the west side of the Golden Horn.

A shuttle bus service free of charge is provided for the visitors departing from Atatürk Cultural Center on Taksim Square every half an hour. İETT also operates several bus lines in the immediate vicinity.

Address:
Eski Silahtarağa Elektrik Santrali (Former Silahtarağa Power Station)
Silahtar Mah. Kazım Karabekir Cad. 1
Eyüp, Istanbul

=== Images ===
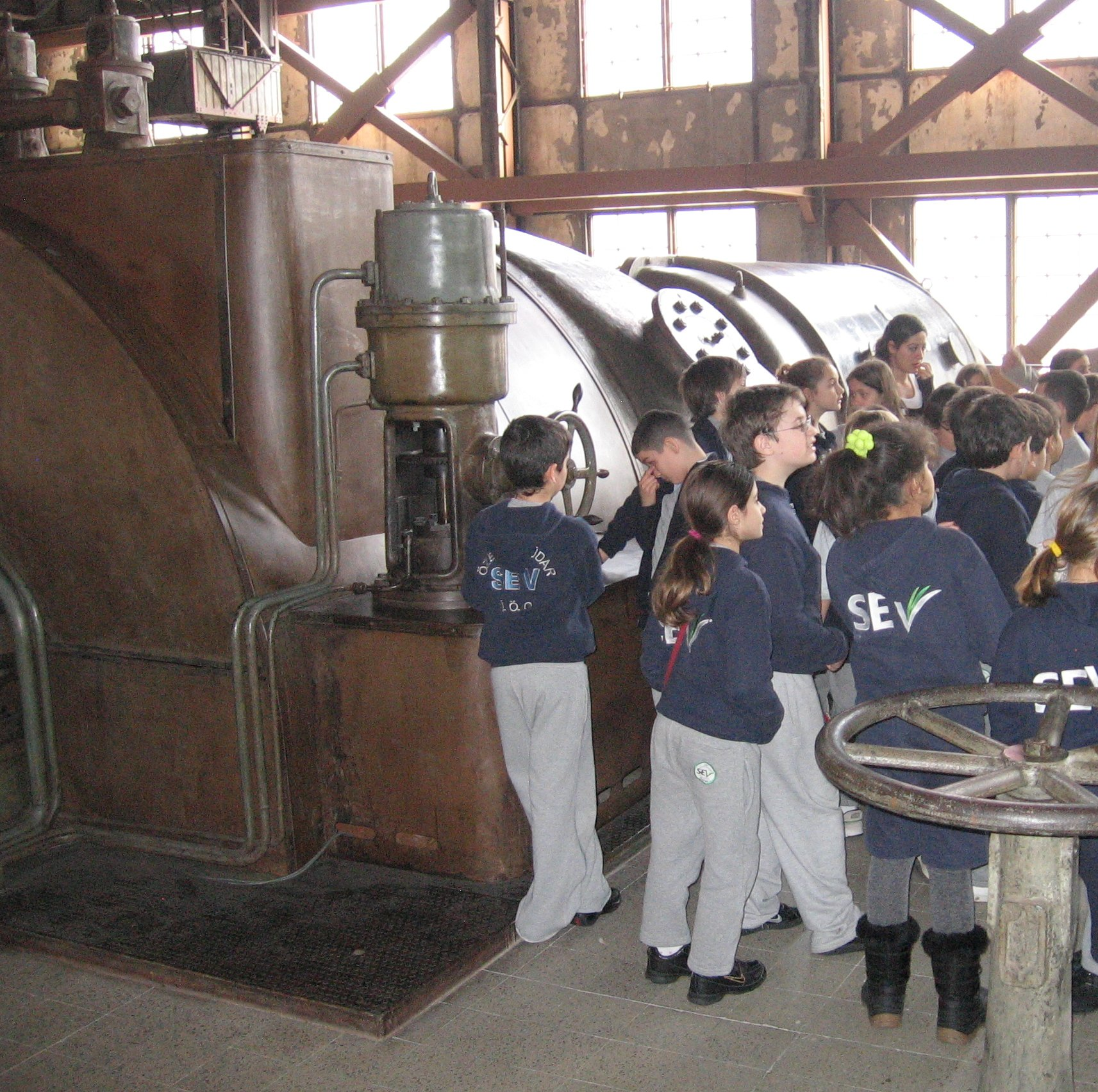
Turbine Hall

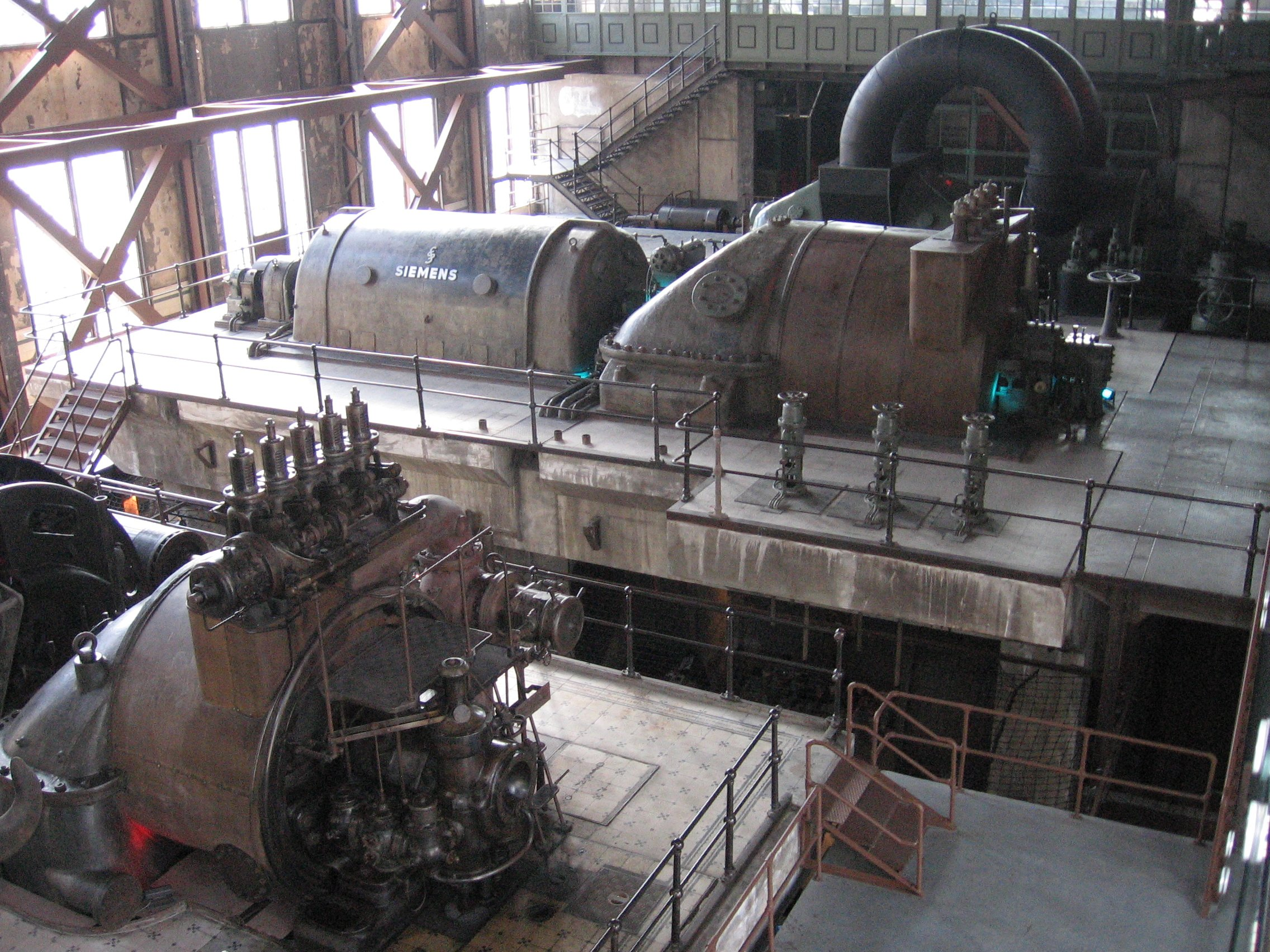
Turbine Hall

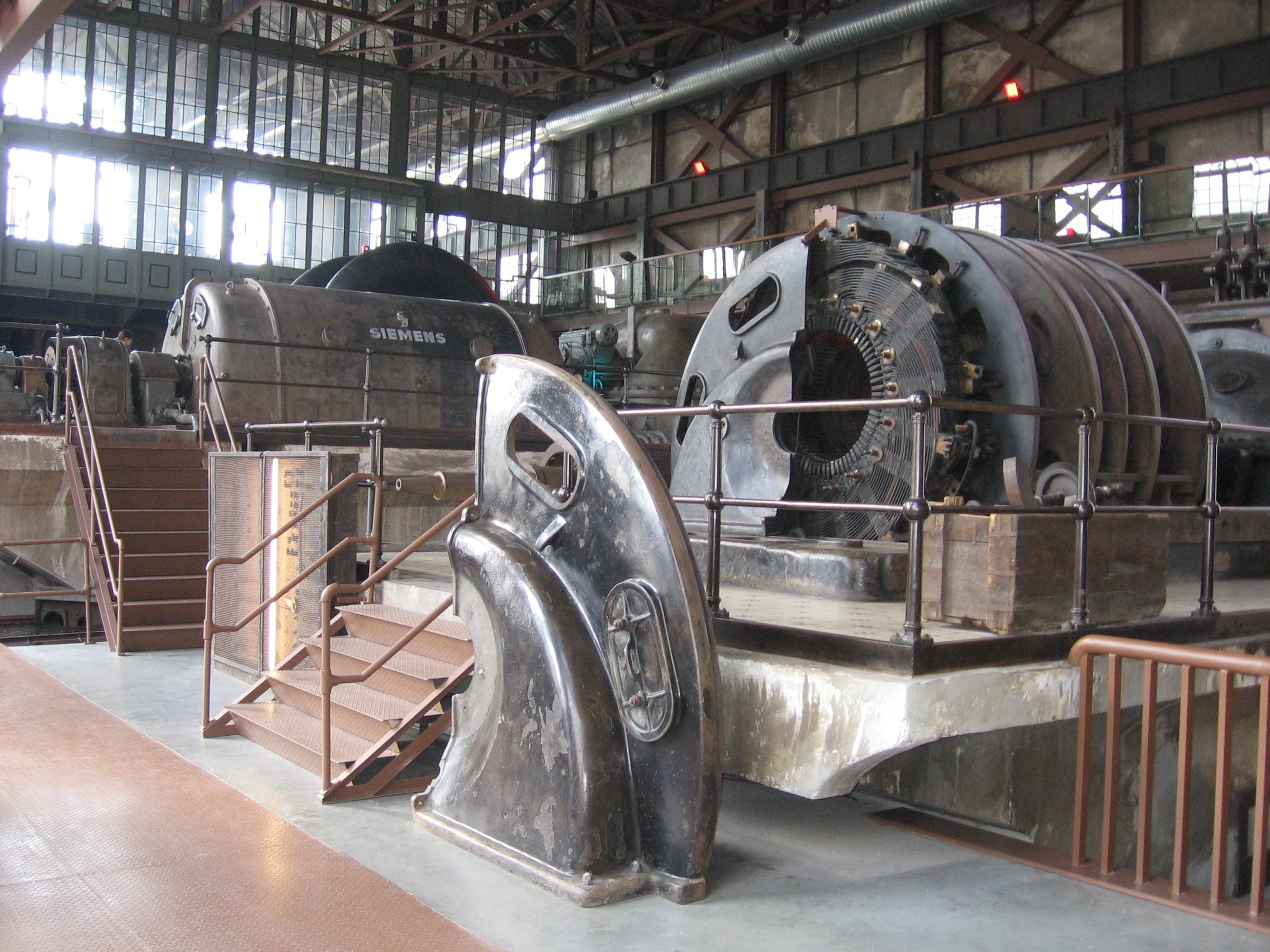
Turbine Hall

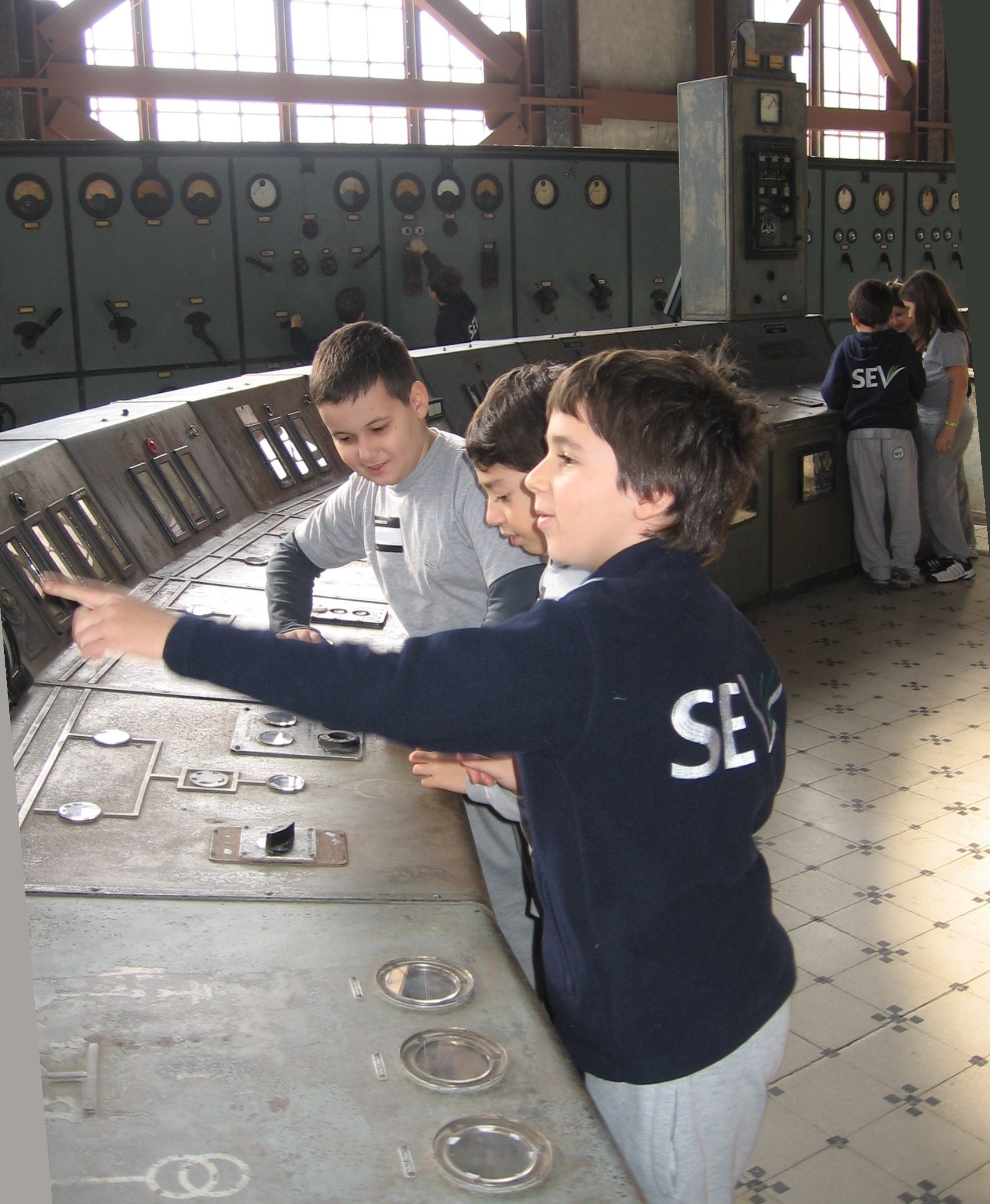
Control Room

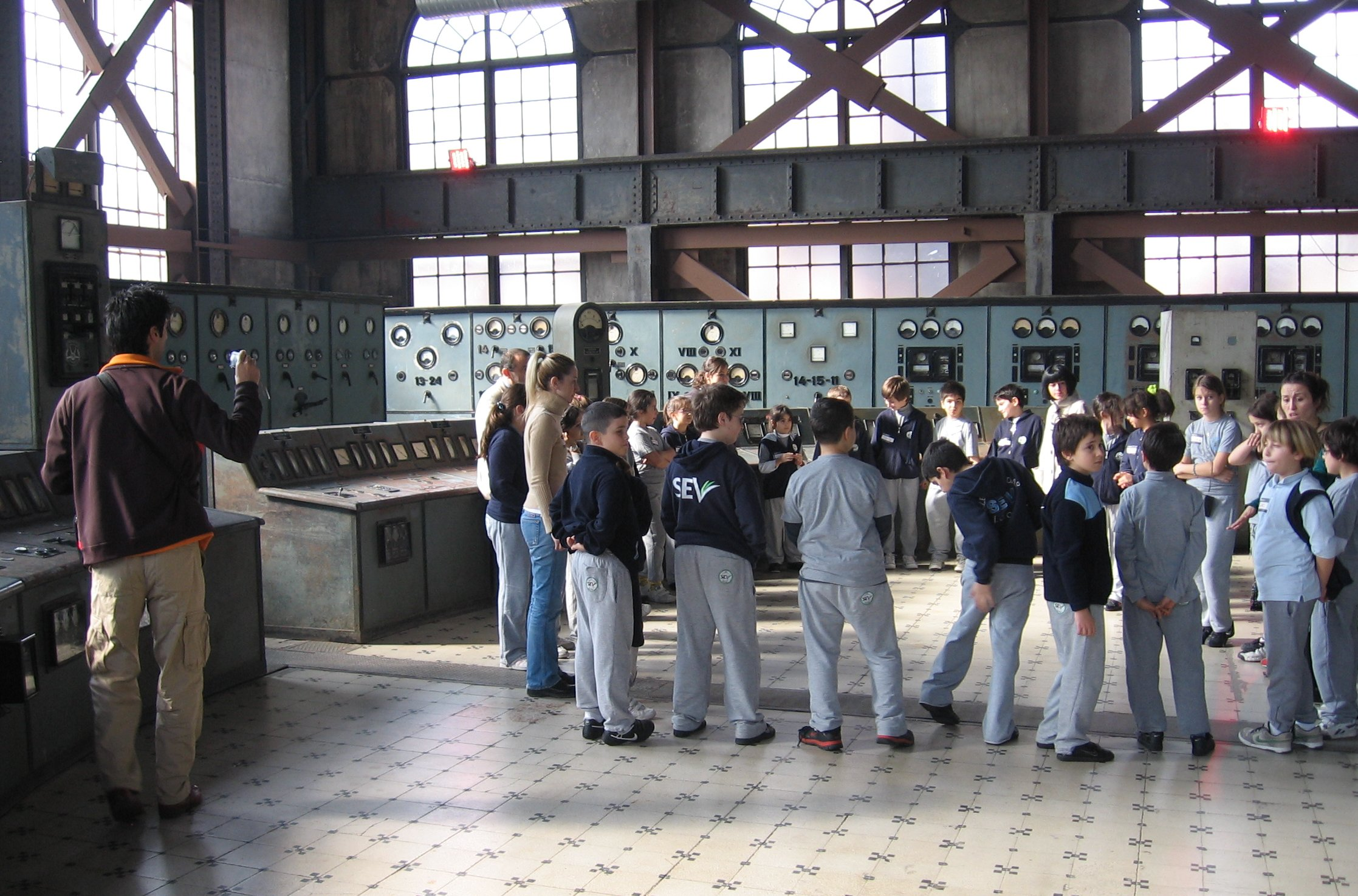
Control Room

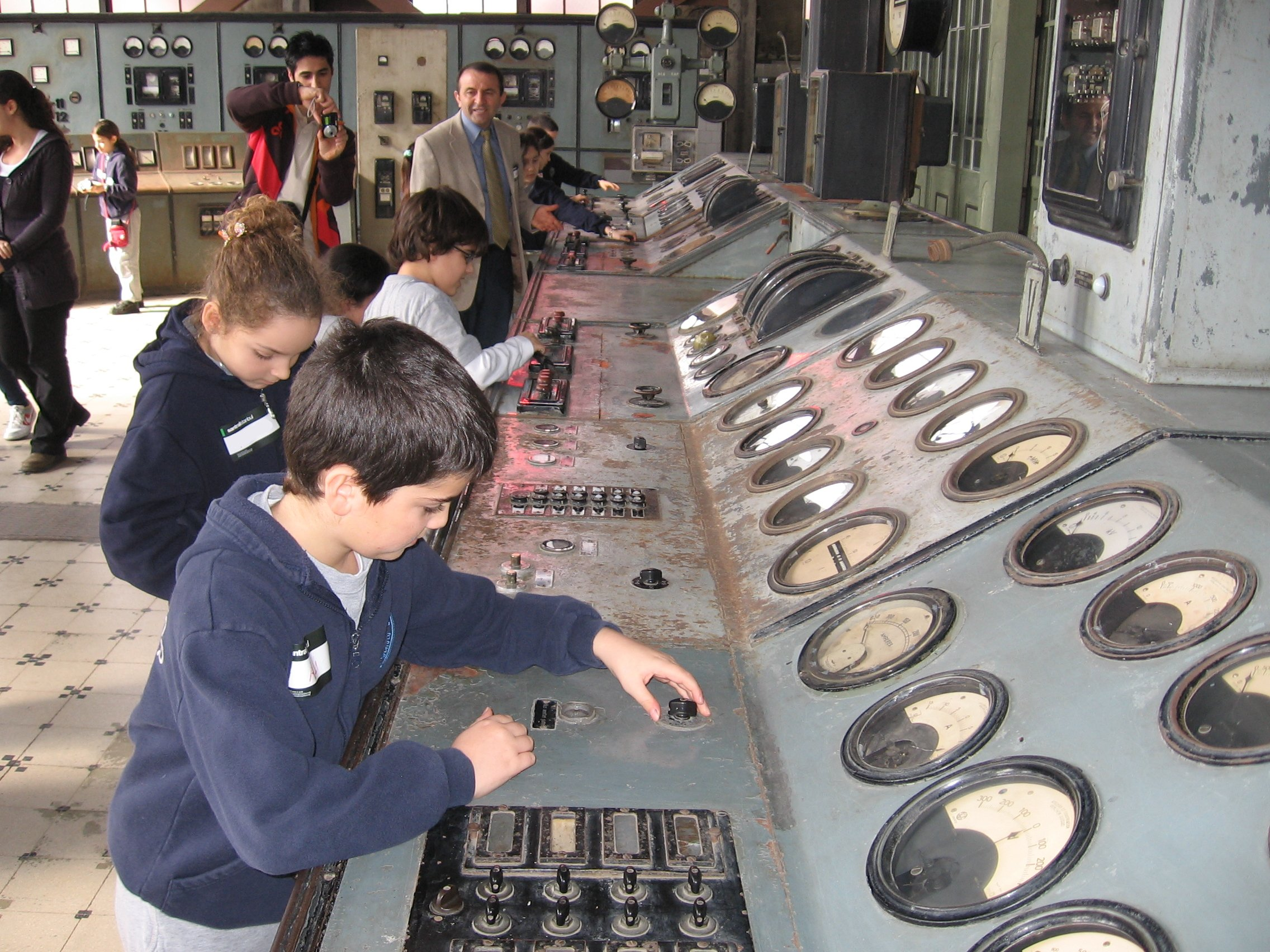
Control Room

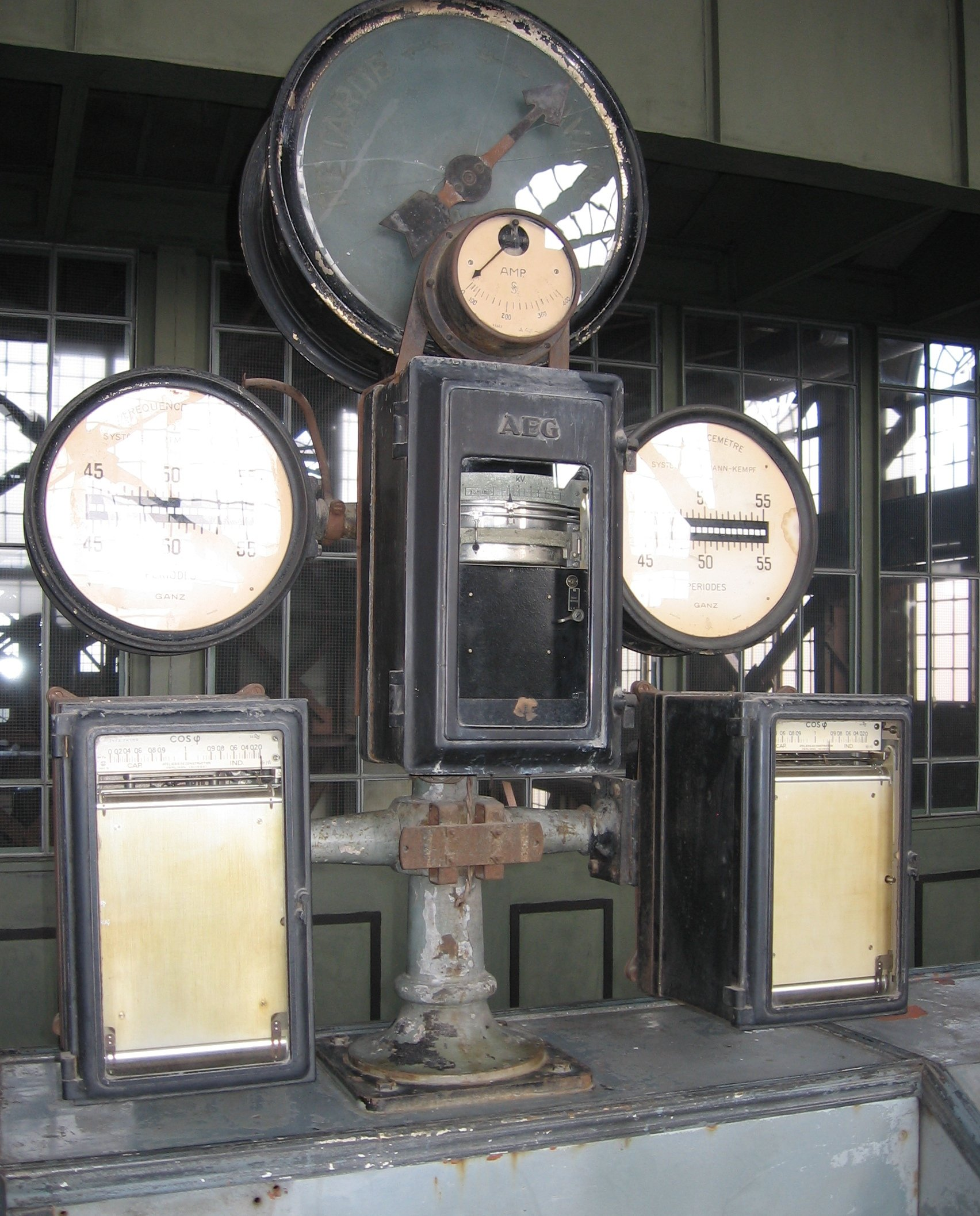
Frequency Synchronization Instrumentation

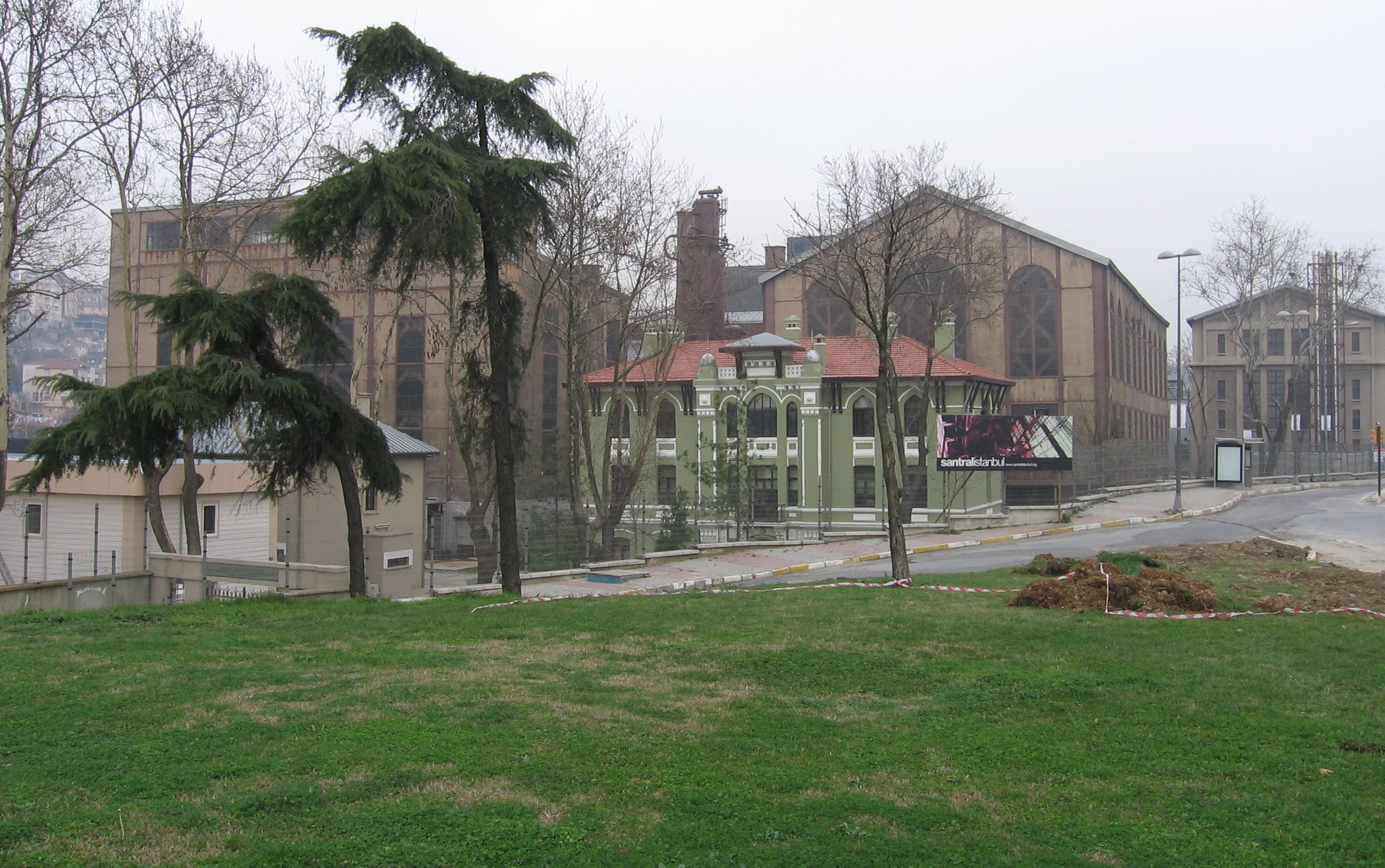
Santralİstanbul exterior view, looking from the south

== İnternal links ==
- Silahtarağa
