= Ahmet Güneştekin =

Kurdish visual artist

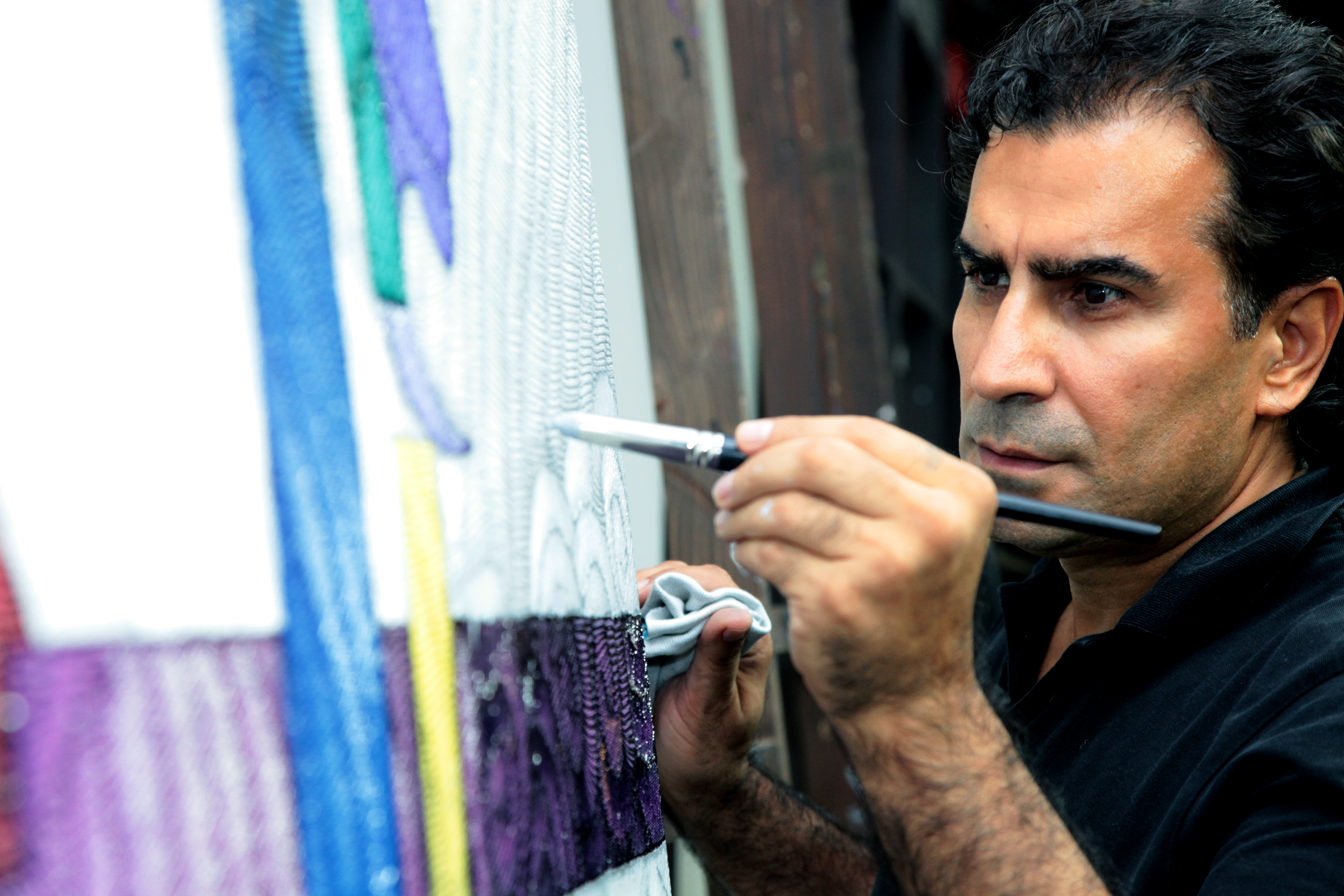
- Born: December 22, 1966 (age 58); Batman, Turkey
- Known for: Painting, conceptual art, sculpture
- Website: www.ahmetgunestekin.com

Ahmet Güneştekin (born December 22, 1966) is a Kurdish visual artist, whose works span painting, conceptual art and constructions sculpture. He left the town of Batman for Istanbul in 1991, but had to wait several years before he found his own style at the beginning of the 2000s. He then abandoned the figurative to pursue a "narrative abstraction" kind of production involving the recollection of a vernacular art, the memory of motifs such as carpets, lamps, and Ottoman copperware .

Güneştekin's technique involves establishing a complex web of black acrylic paint, then filling each of the small spaces with a layer of oil paint, ranging from the light to the dark. Then, using a sort of pen with a rubber tip, he engraves into the paint, and writes as a calligrapher would on a book. He writes on his paintings by removing material, a principle which has more in common with sculpture than painting.

After an agreement he signed with the London-based Marlborough Gallery in 2013, Ahmet Güneştekin's work appeared in an exhibition in the same timeframe as the 55th Venice Biennial. Güneştekin's works appeared in the Italian daily Il Manifesto, La Repubblica, La Stampa. Naturally, his works drew the attention of the art circle.

Güneştekin's work featured in a solo exhibition, "Ahmet Güneştekin: Recent Paintings" between 26 November and 4 January 2014 in Marlborough Gallery. In 2014, his work was exhibited in Arco Madrid followed by the New York Armory Show, Art Breda, and Art Basel Hong Kong. Afterward Marlborough Monaco Gallery opened a solo exhibition by Ahmet Güneştekin from 18 September to 14 November. His works are on display at the Marlborough Galleries in Barcelona, Madrid, Monaco and New York at their permanent exhibition halls year round.

Güneştekin's works can be briefly described as the interpretation of the oral narratives, legends and mythology from Anatolian, Mesopotamian and Greek civilizations using free technique. The solar disc is one of his occurring motifs.

== Exhibitions ==
=== Solo exhibitions ===
2022

- Foreigner Quarter (Gâvur Mahallesi), İzmir, Turkey

2021

- Memory Room (Hafıza Odası), Diyarbakır, Turkey

2014

- Contemporary Istanbul '14, Marlborough Gallery, Istanbul. Turkey
- The Heir to the Solar Disk, Marlborough Monaco, Monaco
- KunstRAI Amsterdam, Mark Peet Visser Gallery, Amsterdam, Netherlands
- Faces of the Sun, Mark Peet Visser Gallery, Den Bosch, Netherlands
- Ahmet Güneştekin: Recent Paintings, Marlborough Gallery, New York, United States

2013

- Momentum of Memory, Arsenale Docks, Venice, Italy
- Encounter Ankara, CerModern, Ankara, Turkey
- Contemporary Istanbul '13, (represented by Marlborough Gallery), Istanbul, Turkey

2012

- Encounter Istanbul, Antrepo 3, Istanbul, Turkey
- Carpet and Rug Design, Armaggan Art & Design Gallery, Istanbul, Turkey
- A Lot, Güler Art Gallery, Ankara, Turkey
- Intersections / Transformation, Santral Istanbul, Istanbul, Turkey
- Contemporary Istanbul '12, Mim Art Gallery, Istanbul, Turkey

2010–2011

- Pure Justice, Contemporary Istanbul '11, (represented by Gallery Baraz), Istanbul, Turkey
- Doors Opening to the Sun, Contemporary Istanbul '10, (represented by Gallery Baraz), Istanbul, Turkey
- Immortality, Casa Dell'Arte Art Gallery, Istanbul, Turkey

2009

- Elixir, Çırağan Palace Kempinski Art Gallery, Istanbul, Turkey
- Immortality Gate, Contemporary Istanbul '09, (represented by Casa Dell'Arte Art Gallery), Istanbul, Turkey
- Contemporary I, Painting and Sculpture Exhibition, Bali Art Gallery, Istanbul, Turkey

2007–2008

- The Fall of Troya, Contemporary Istanbul '08, (represented by Çağla Cabaoğlu Gallery), Istanbul, Turkey
- Antique Modern, Contemporary Istanbul '07, (represented by Çağla Cabaoğlu Gallery), Istanbul, Turkey
- Civilizations Born in the Footsteps of the Sun, AKM, Istanbul, Turkey

2005–2006

- Sîmûrg, Contemporary Istanbul '06, (represented by Gallery Baraz), Istanbul, Turkey
- Aura, Toprak Art Gallery, Istanbul, Turkey
- Sun Dance, Garage of Art, Istanbul, Turkey
- Love in Mesopotamia, Atakule Vakıfbank Art Gallery, Ankara, Turkey

2003–2004

- Gallery Artist, Istanbul, Turkey
- The Colors after Darkness, AKM, Istanbul, Turkey

=== Group exhibitions ===
2014

- Art Market Budapest, Güler Sanat, Budapest, Hungary
- Summer Show, Marlborough Gallery, Madrid, Spain
- Art Basel Hong Kong, Marlborough Gallery, Hong Kong
- Art Breda, Mark Peet Visser Gallery, Breda, Netherlands
- The Armory Show, Marlborough Gallery, New York, United States
- Arco Madrid, Marlborough Gallery, Madrid, Spain

2013

- Art Basel Miami Beach, Marlborough Gallery, Miami, United States
- Art Market Budapest, Güler Art, Budapest, Hungary
- Sconfinamenti, Spoleto56 Festival, (curated by Achille Bonito Oliva), Spoleto, Italy

2011–2012

- Sergüzeşt, Güler Art Gallery, Ankara, Turkey
- Summer Exhibition, Antrepo 5, (Gallery Beyaz), Istanbul, Turkey

== Catalogue articles ==
Stéphanie Pioda, The Heir to the Solar Disk, Marlborough Gallery Inc., Monaco, September, 2014.

Bertjan ter Braak, Faces of the Sun, Mark Peet Visser Gallery, Den Bosch, The Netherlands, April, 2014.

Donald Kuspit, The Uses of Mysticism: Ahmet Güneştekin's Abstractions, Marlborough Gallery, New York, November, 2013.

Beral Madra, Momentum of Memory, GSM Publications, Istanbul, May 2013.

Johannes Odenthal, Abstraction and Mythos, Anatolia's Cultural Memory within Contemporary Art: About Ahmet Güneştekin's Artworks, GSM Publications, Istanbul, September, 2012.

Yalçın Sadak, Following the Traces of Sun: A Myth Ahmet Güneştekin, GSM Publications, Istanbul, November, 2010.

Kaya Özsezgin, Authentic Archaism in Ahmet Güneştekin's Paintings, GSM Publications, Istanbul, November, 2009.

Gülseli İnal, Antique Modern, GSM Publications, Istanbul, March, 2007.

== Following the Traces of the Sun with the Masters ==
Ahmet Güneştekin traced and compiled ancient myths, oral narratives and legends of Anatolia and Mesopotamia as of 1997. He took excursions to the villages and towns of Anatolia and Mesopotamia and conducted in-depth researches since 2003. He set up art exhibitions in the historical sights and public spaces together with many artists from contemporary art, sculpture and photography. The series of the exhibition titled Following the Traces of the Sun with the Masters brought about his first major exhibition, The Colors after Darkness.

== Documentary films ==
Güneştekin became the art director of the news show Haberci, produced and directed by Coşkun Aral in 2005. Afterwards he produces his own documentary series titled Following the Traces of the Sun for TRT 1 and the series came to be the first documentary films to focus on art in Turkey.

== Children's art classes ==
In his excursions to Anatolia and Mesopotamia, Ahmet Güneştekin provided painting classes to the children so that they can learn how to express themselves in visual arts. In classes, Güneştekin taught children about art concepts and techniques by exposing them to many different kinds of art materials. Güneştekin met over 5,000 children and introduced them the world of painting.

== See also ==
- İsimlerin Şehri İstanbul, Galataport, Istanbul
