= Çağlayan, Kağıthane =

Çağlayan
- Neighbourhood
- Location in Turkey Çağlayan (Istanbul)
- Coordinates: 41°04′37″N 28°58′55″E
- Country: Turkey
- Province: Istanbul
- District: Kağıthane
- Population (2022): 31,895
- Time zone: UTC+3 (TRT)
- Area code: 0212

Çağlayan is a neighbourhood in the municipality and district of Kağıthane, Istanbul Province, Turkey. Its population is 31,895 (2022). The Istanbul Justice Palace is located here.
