= Kâzım Karabekir station =

Station of the Istanbul Metro

Kâzım Karabekir
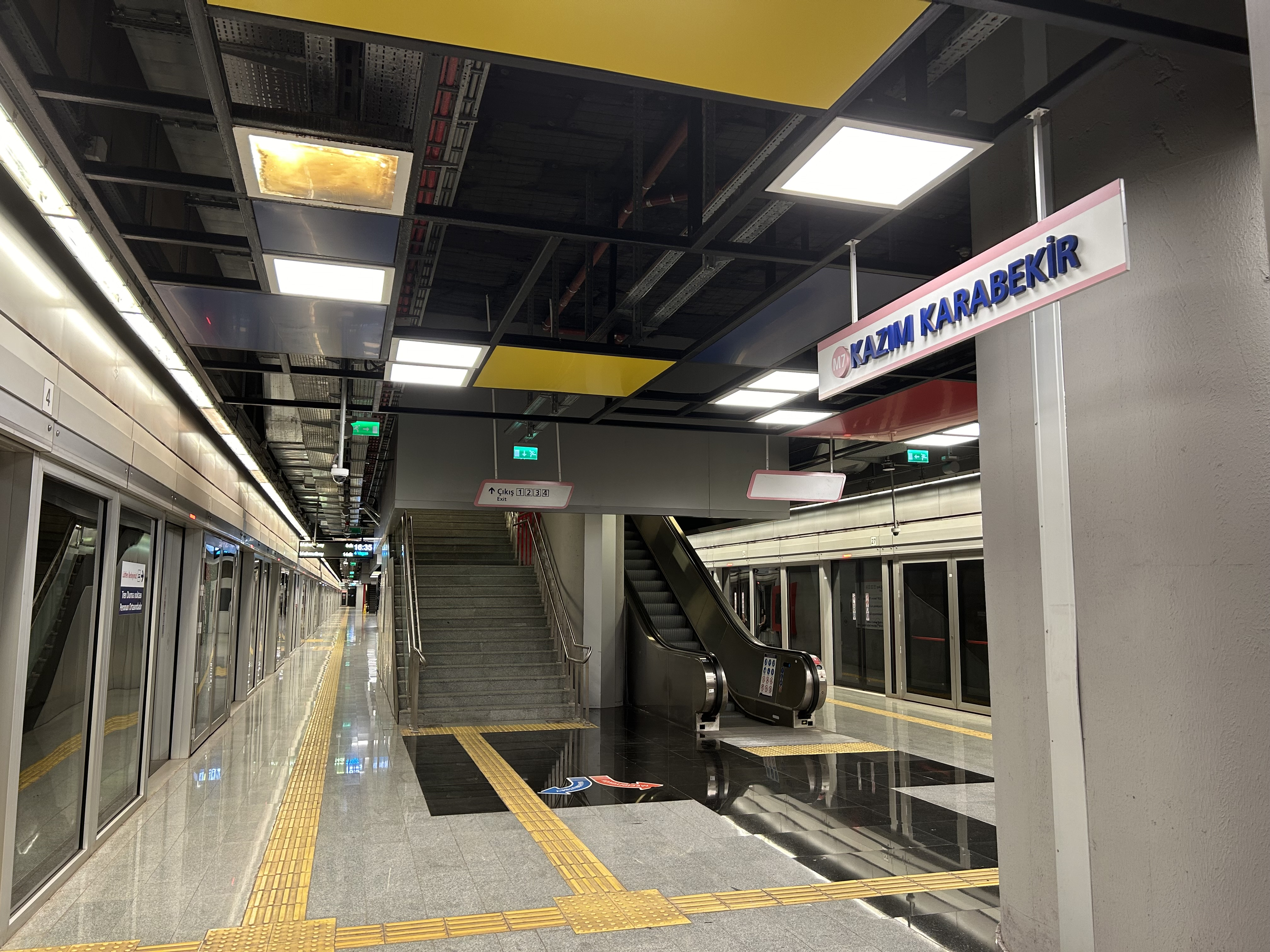
- Platform

General information
- Location: Kâzım Karabekir Neighborhood, Abdi İpekçi Street / Hekimsuyu Street, 34225; Gaziosmanpaşa, Istanbul; Turkey
- Coordinates: 41°5′6″N 28°54′35″E
- System: Istanbul Metro rapid transit station
- Owner: Istanbul Metropolitan Municipality
- Operator: Istanbul Metro
- Line: M7
- Platforms: 1 Island platform
- Tracks: 2
- Connections: İETT Bus: Küçükköy İmam Hatip Lisesi: 36L, 38B, 38Z, 50AT, 88, 88A, HT5, MK49, MK53; Istanbul Minibus: Eyüpsultan - Gazi Mahallesi, Eyüpsultan - Cebeci Mahallesi, Otogar - Yunus Emre Mahallesi, Gazi Mahallesi - Topkapı

Construction
- Structure type: Underground
- Parking: No
- Cycle facilities: Yes
- Accessible: Yes

History
- Opened: 28 October 2020 (5 years ago)
- Electrified: 1,500 V DC Overhead line

Services
Preceding station	Istanbul Metro	Following station
Yenimahalle towards Mahmutbey	M7 Line	Yeşilpınar towards Yıldız
Location

Kâzım Karabekir is an underground station on the M7 line of the Istanbul Metro. It is located under the intersection of Abdi İpekçi Street and Hekimsuyu Street in the Kâzım Karabekir neighborhood of Gaziosmanpaşa. It was opened on 28 October 2020.

== Station layout ==
Z	Enter/Exit ↘↓ (1–2)
B1	Underpass ↘↓		Enter/Exit ↓↙ (3–4)	Z
B2	Underpass →	Ticket Hall↓	← Underpass	B1
B3	Platform	Platform	Platform	B2

Platform level	Westbound	← toward Mahmutbey (Yenimahalle)
Platform level	Island platform, doors will open on the left
Platform level	Eastbound	toward Mecidiyeköy (Yeşilpınar) →

== Operation information ==
The M7 line operates between 06:00 and 00:00 with a train frequency of 6 minutes at peak hours and 7.5 minutes at all other times. The line also operates night metro services between 00:00 and 06:00 on Saturdays and Sundays, with trains running every 30 minutes. This provides 66 hours of uninterrupted service between Friday and Sunday. During these hours, fares are charged at double the price. During this time, Entrances 1, 3 and 4 are open, whilst Entrance 2 is closed.

== Gallery ==
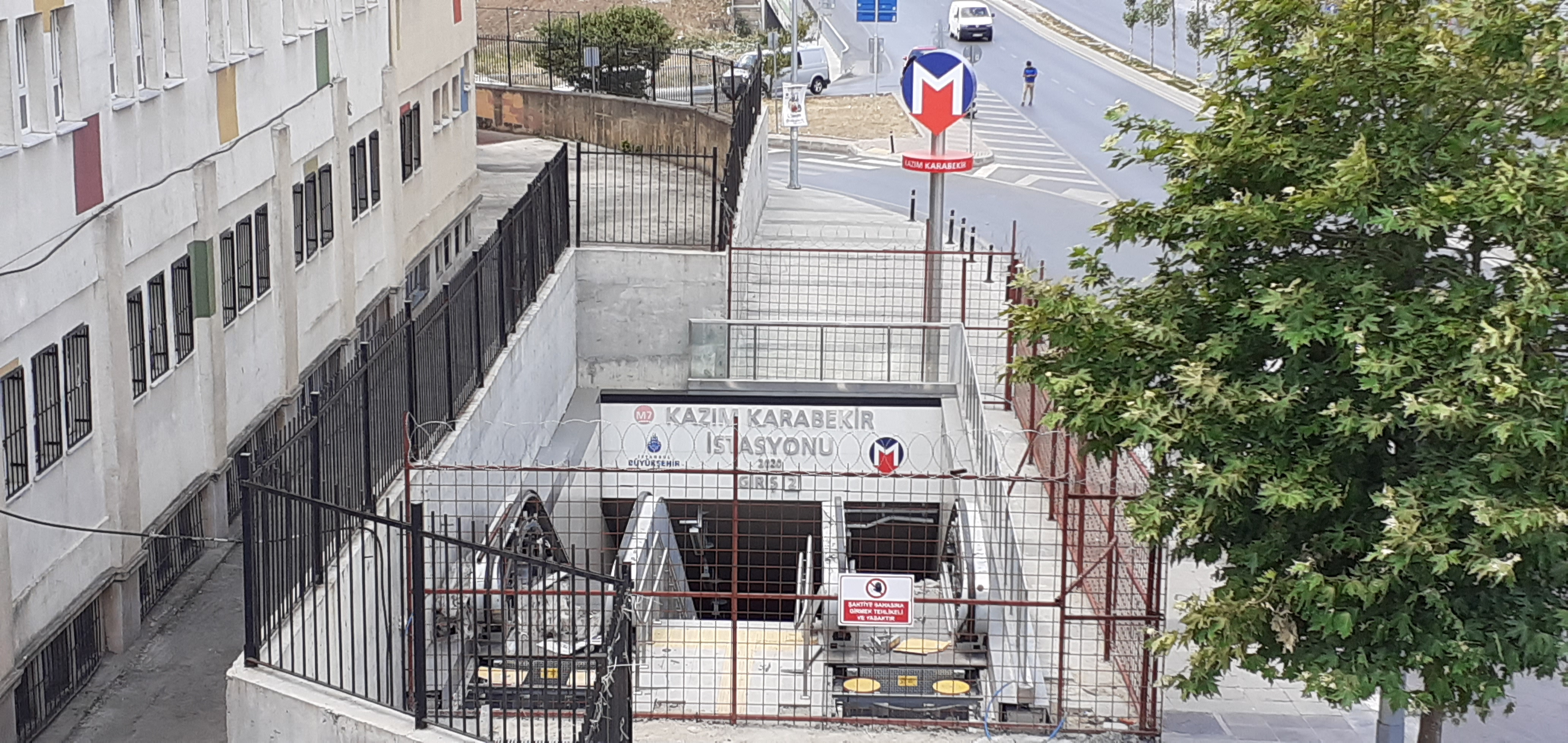
Under construction (September 2020)

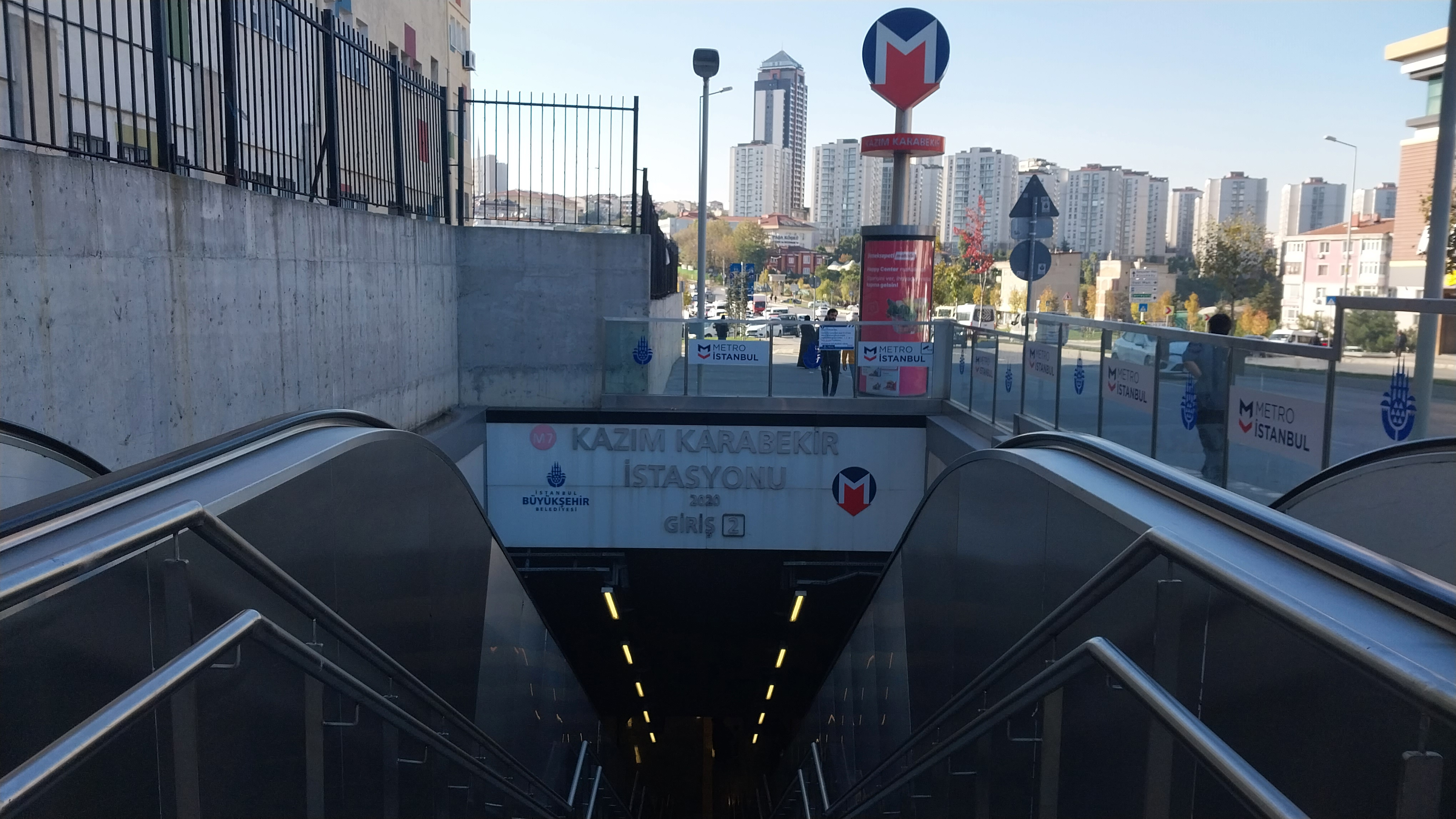
Entrance 2

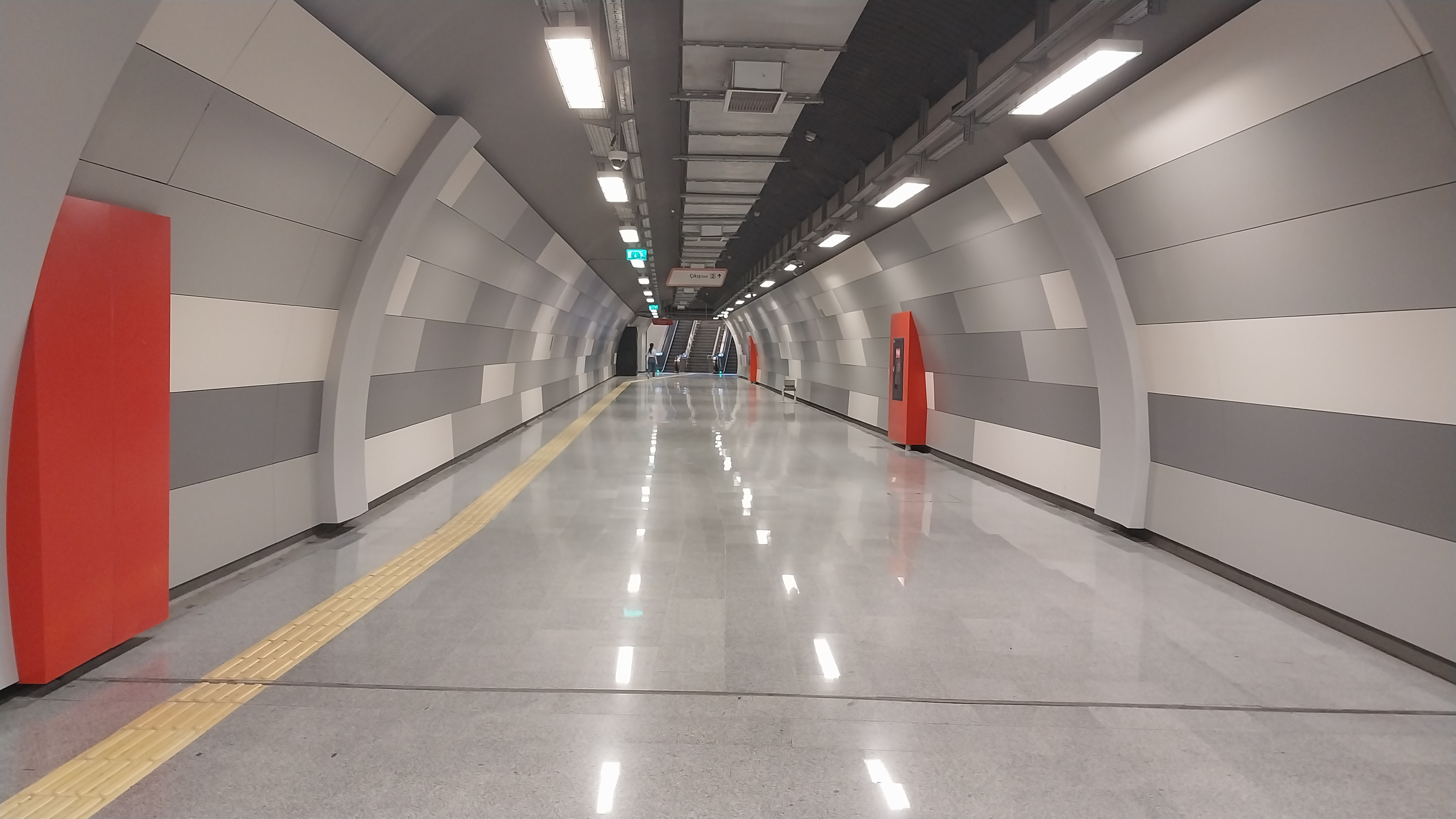
Pedestrian underpass

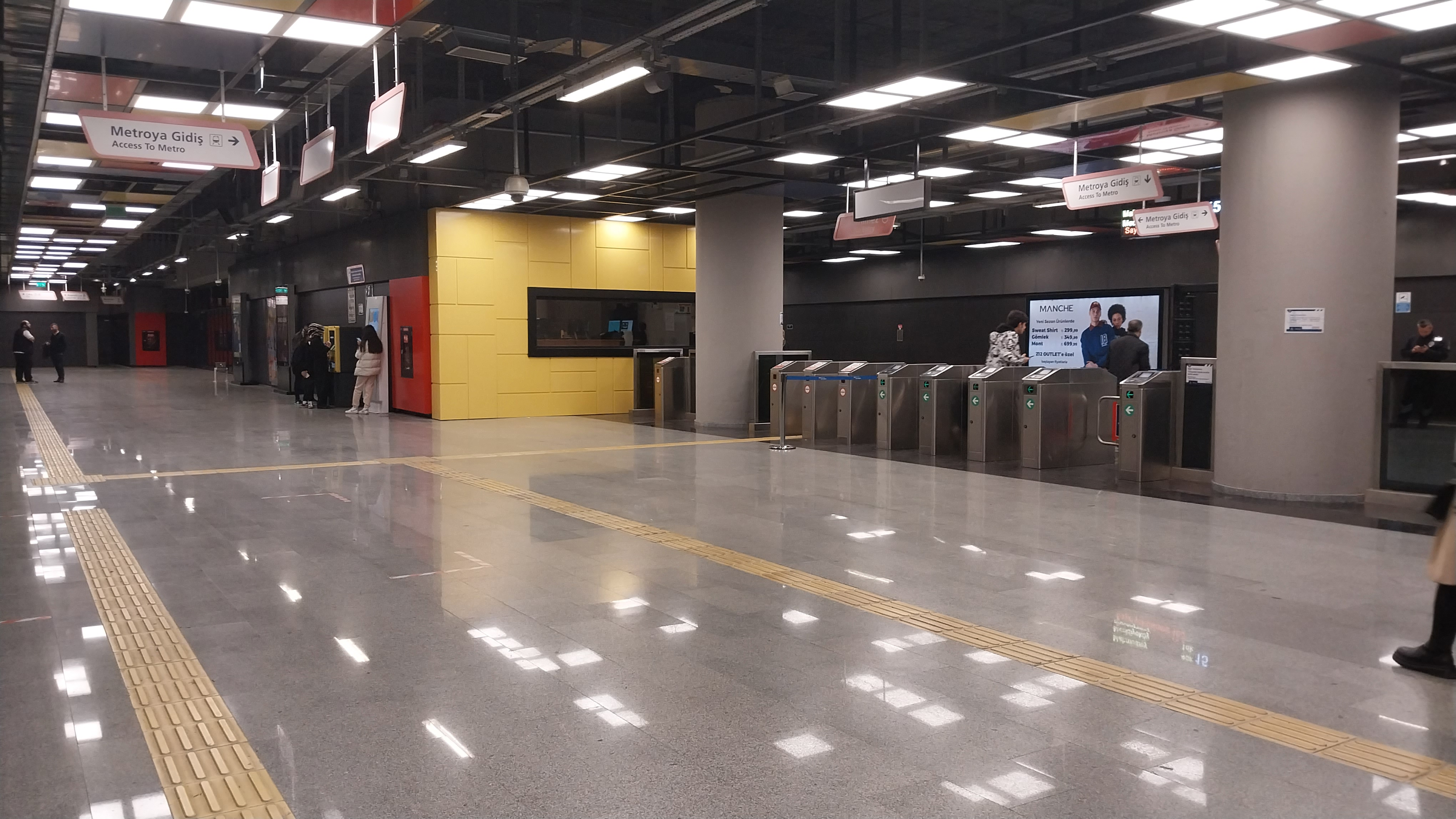
Ticket hall

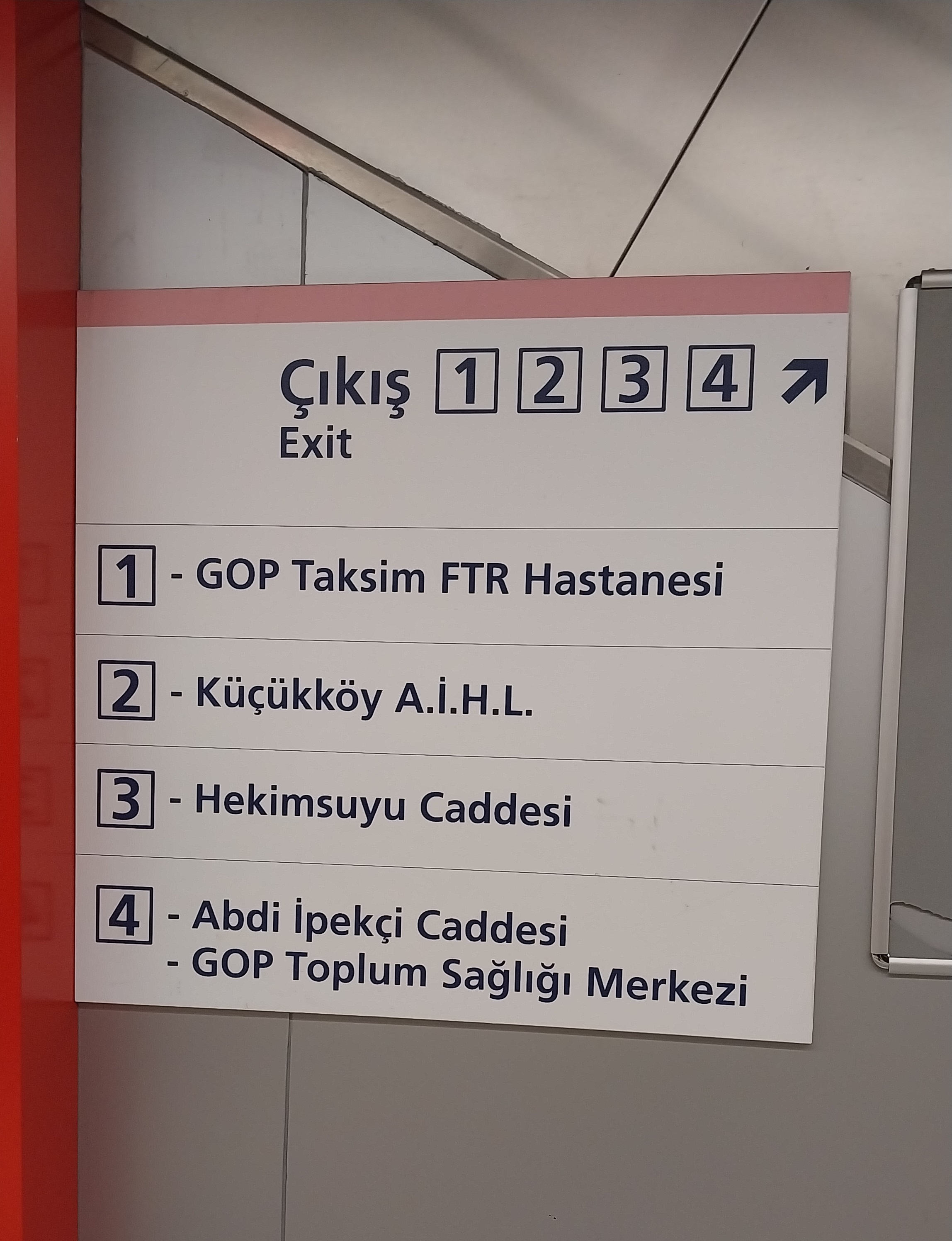
Exit sign

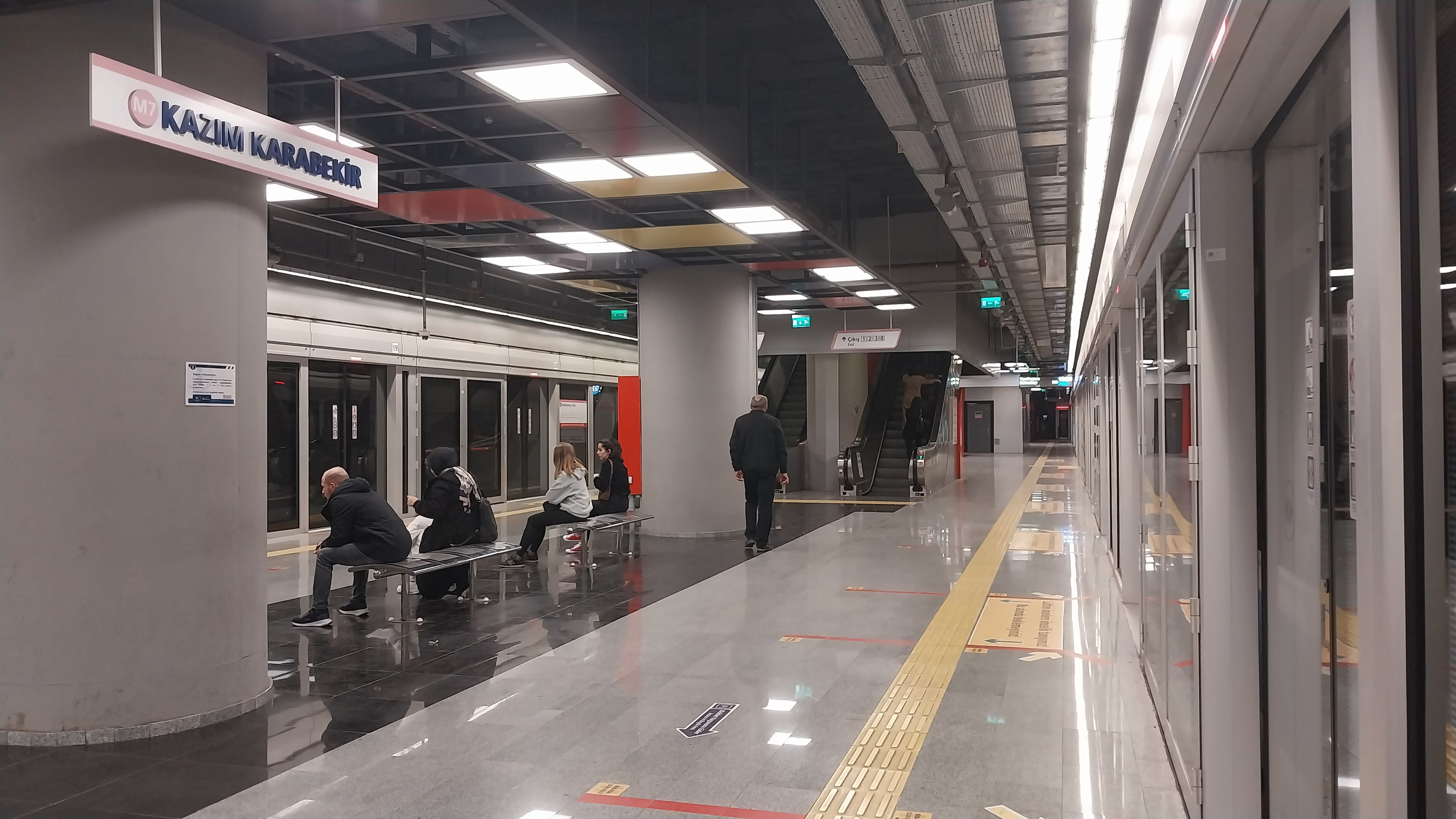
Platform view 1

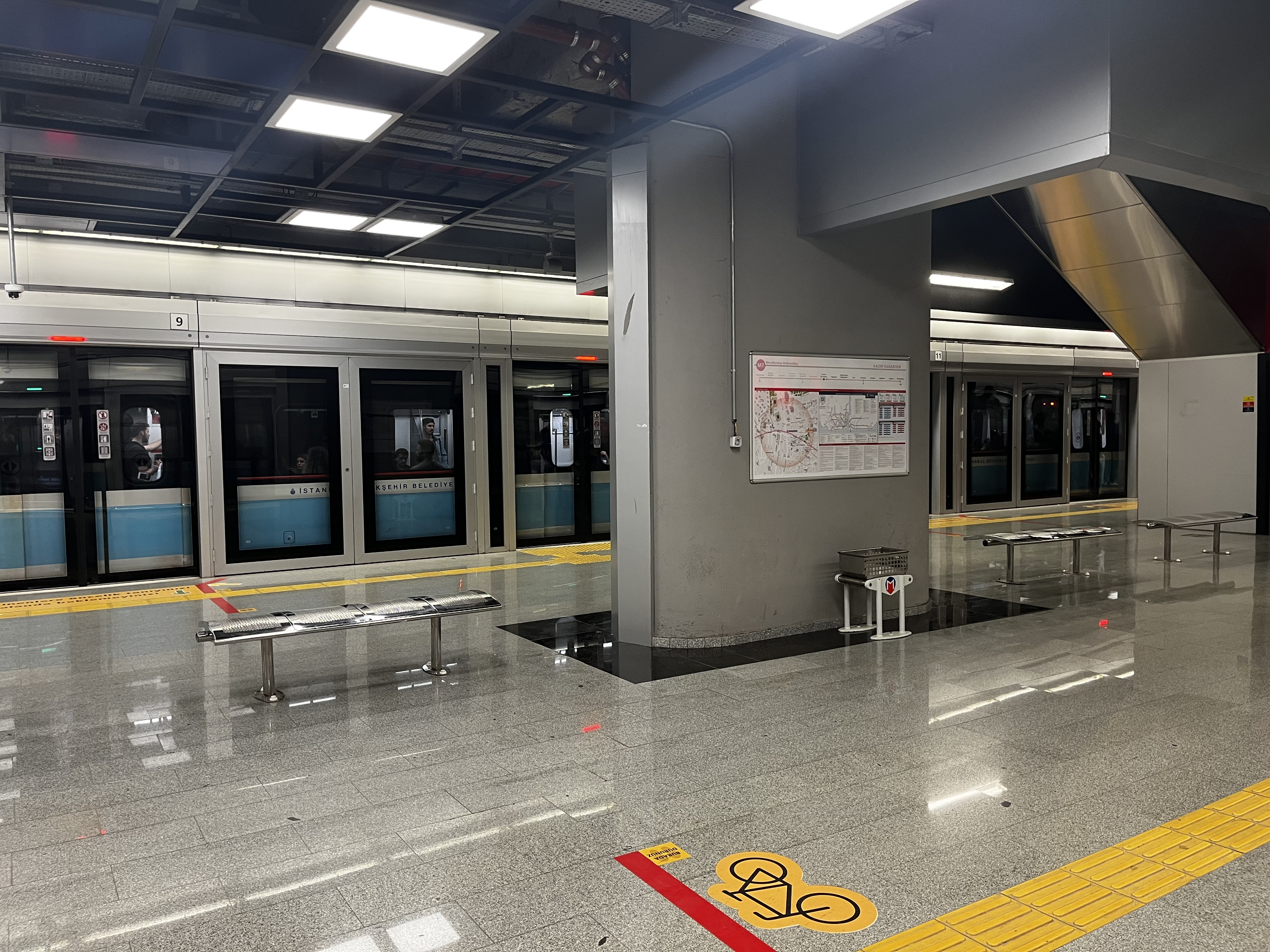
Platform view 2
