= Çırçır station =

Station of the Istanbul Metro

Çırçır
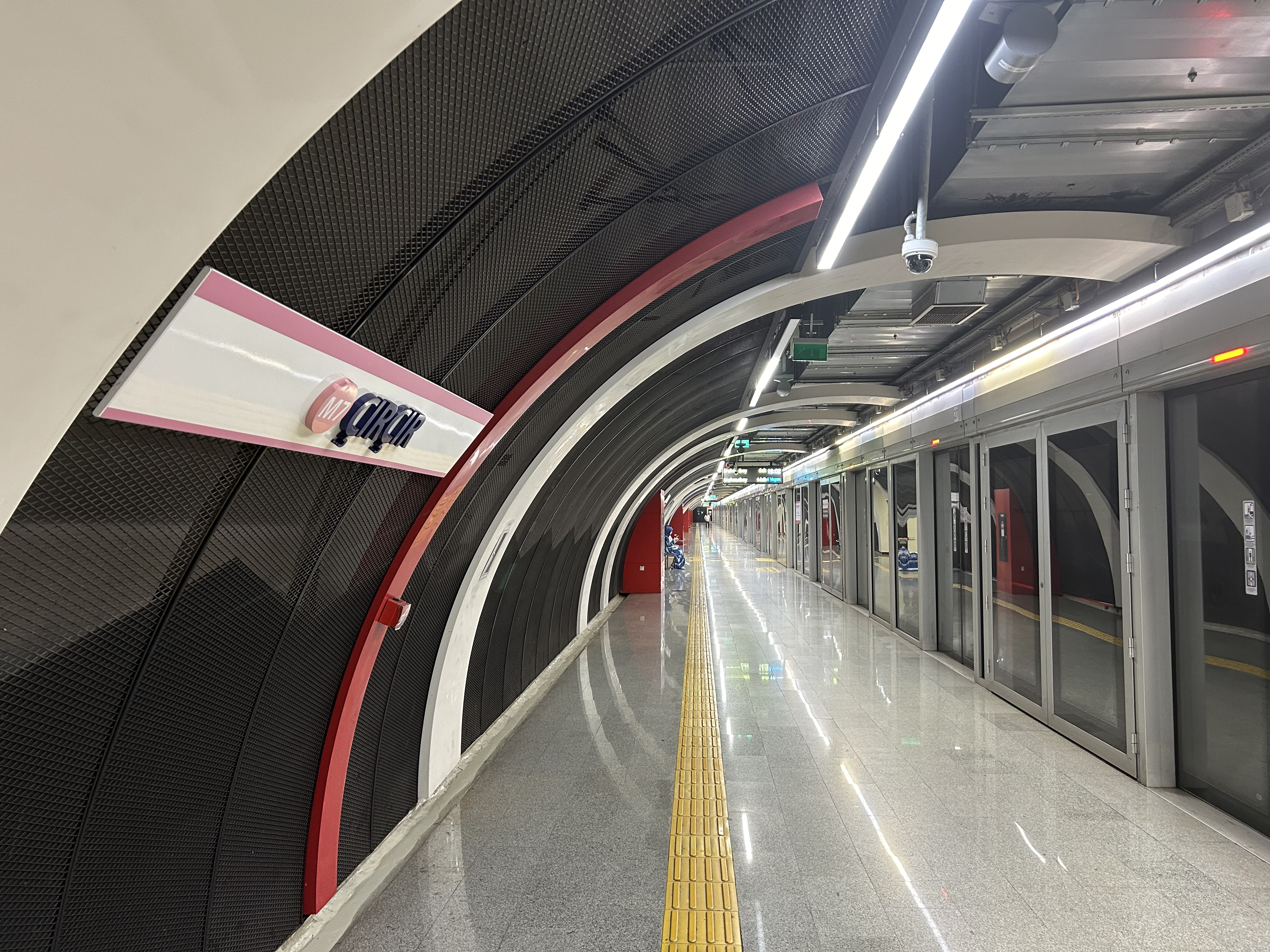
- Platform

General information
- Location: Çırçır Neighborhood, Atatürk Boulevard, 34070; Eyüp, Istanbul; Turkey
- Coordinates: 41°4′48″N 28°56′7″E
- System: Istanbul Metro rapid transit station
- Owner: Istanbul Metropolitan Municipality
- Operator: Istanbul Metro
- Line: M7
- Platforms: 1 Island platform
- Tracks: 2
- Connections: İETT Bus: 50P, TM7; Istanbul Minibus: Aksaray - İmar Blokları, Şişhane - İmar Blokları, Şişli - İmar Blokları, Gaziosmanpaşa - Finanskent, Gaziosmanpaşa - Yeşilpınar - Finanskent

Construction
- Structure type: Underground
- Parking: No
- Cycle facilities: Yes
- Accessible: Yes

History
- Opened: 28 October 2020 (5 years ago)
- Electrified: 1,500 V DC Overhead line

Services
Preceding station	Istanbul Metro	Following station
Veysel Karani–Akşemsettin towards Mahmutbey	M7 Line	Alibeyköy towards Yıldız
Location

Çırçır is an underground station on the M7 line of the Istanbul Metro. It is located under Atatürk Boulevard in the Çırçır neighborhood of Eyüp. It was opened on 28 October 2020.

== Station layout ==
Z	Enter/Exit ↓ (1–2)	Enter/Exit ↓ (3)
B1	Ticket Hall ↓	Ticket Hall↓	← Underpass
B2	Underpass -2 ↓	↓
B3	Underpass -3 ↓	↓
B4	Platform	Platform

Platform level	Westbound	← toward Mahmutbey (Veysel Karani-Akşemsettin)
Platform level	Island platform, doors will open on the left
Platform level	Eastbound	toward Mecidiyeköy (Alibeyköy) →

== Operation information ==
The M7 line operates between 06:00 and 00:00 with a train frequency of 6 minutes at peak hours and 7.5 minutes at all other times. The line also operates night metro services between 00:00 and 06:00 on Saturdays and Sundays, with trains running every 30 minutes. This provides 66 hours of uninterrupted service between Friday and Sunday. During these hours, fares are charged at double the price. During this time, Entrances 1 and 2 are open, whilst Entrance 3 is closed.

== Gallery ==
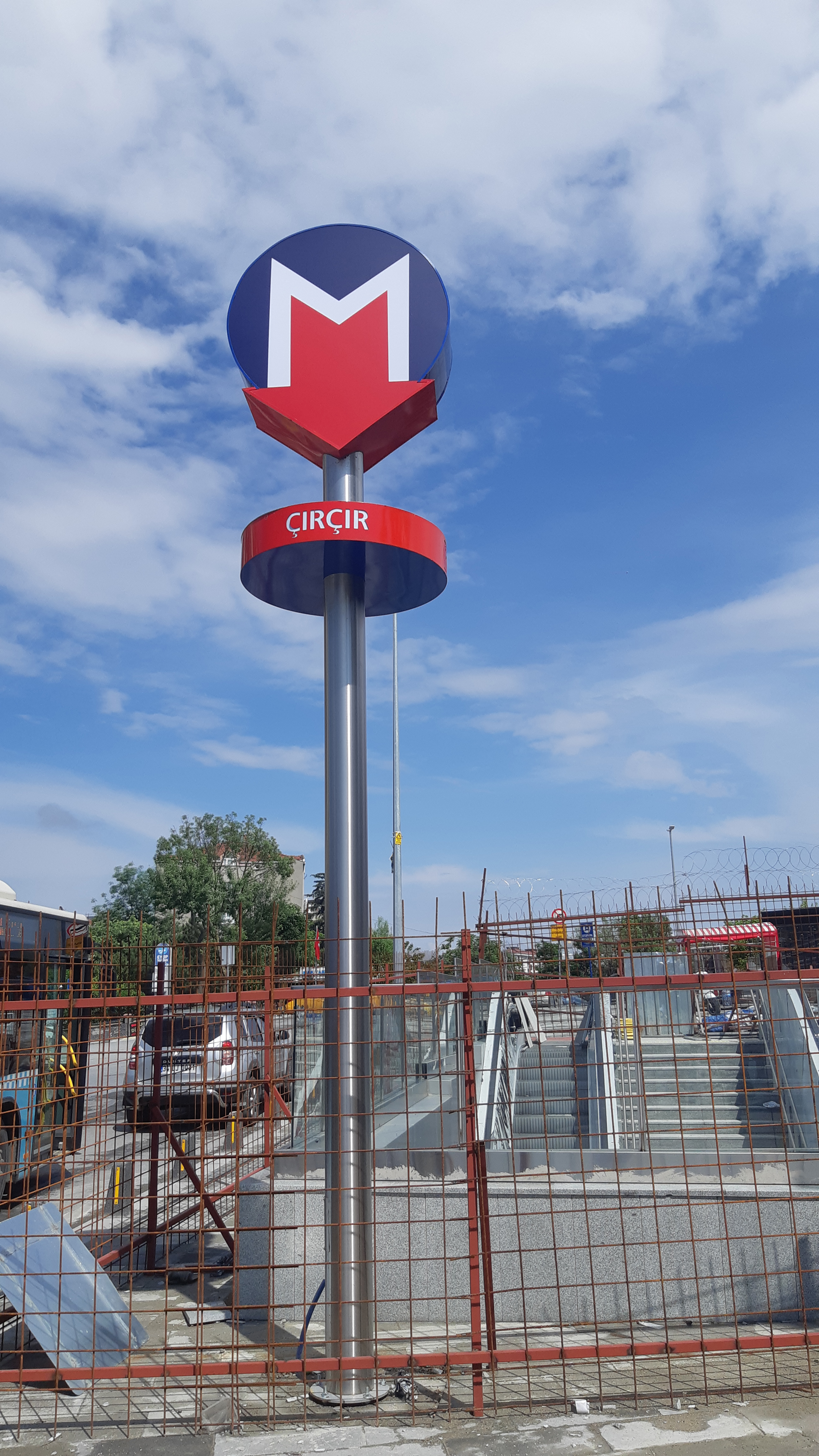
Under construction (June 2020)

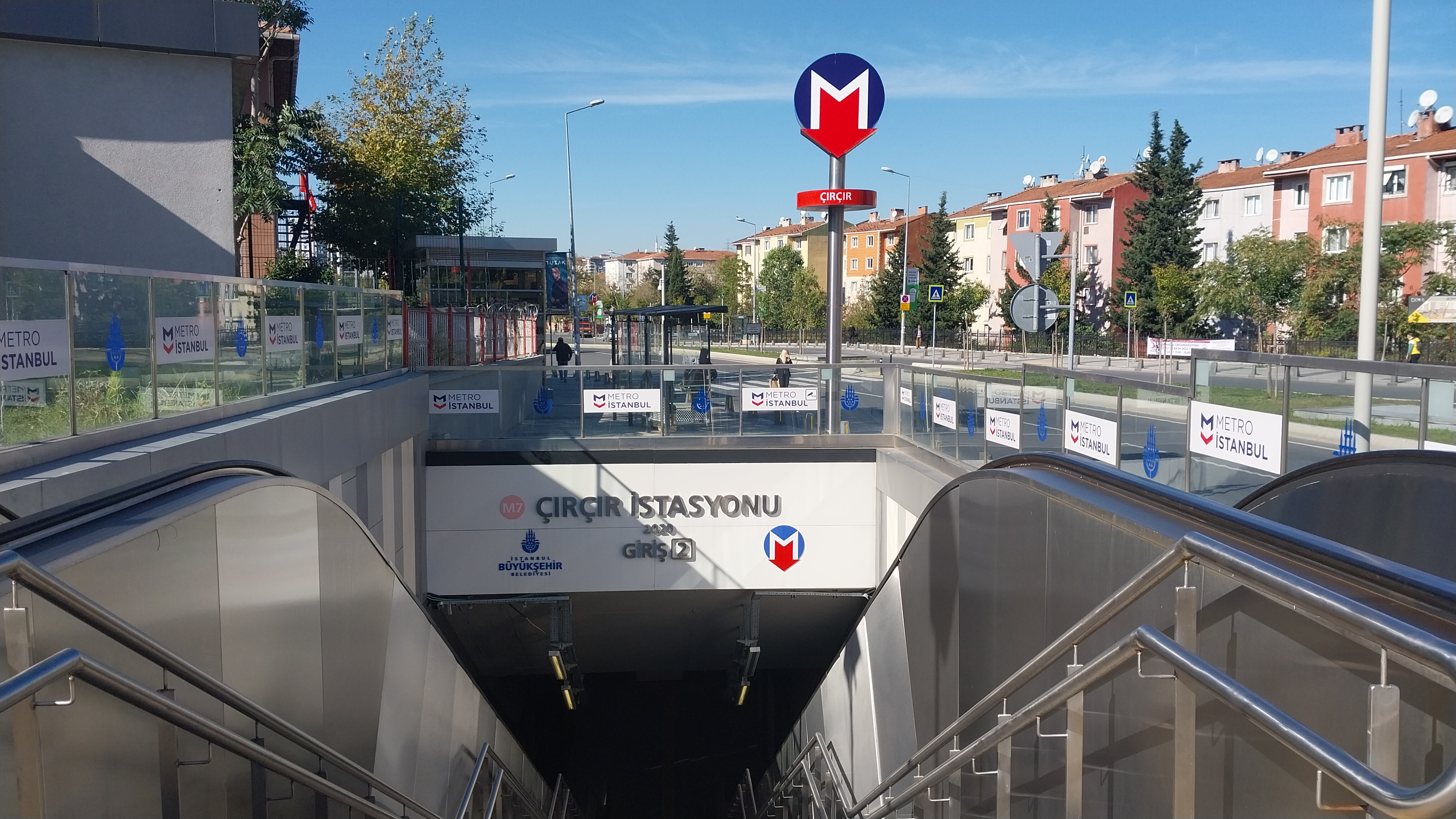
Entrance 2

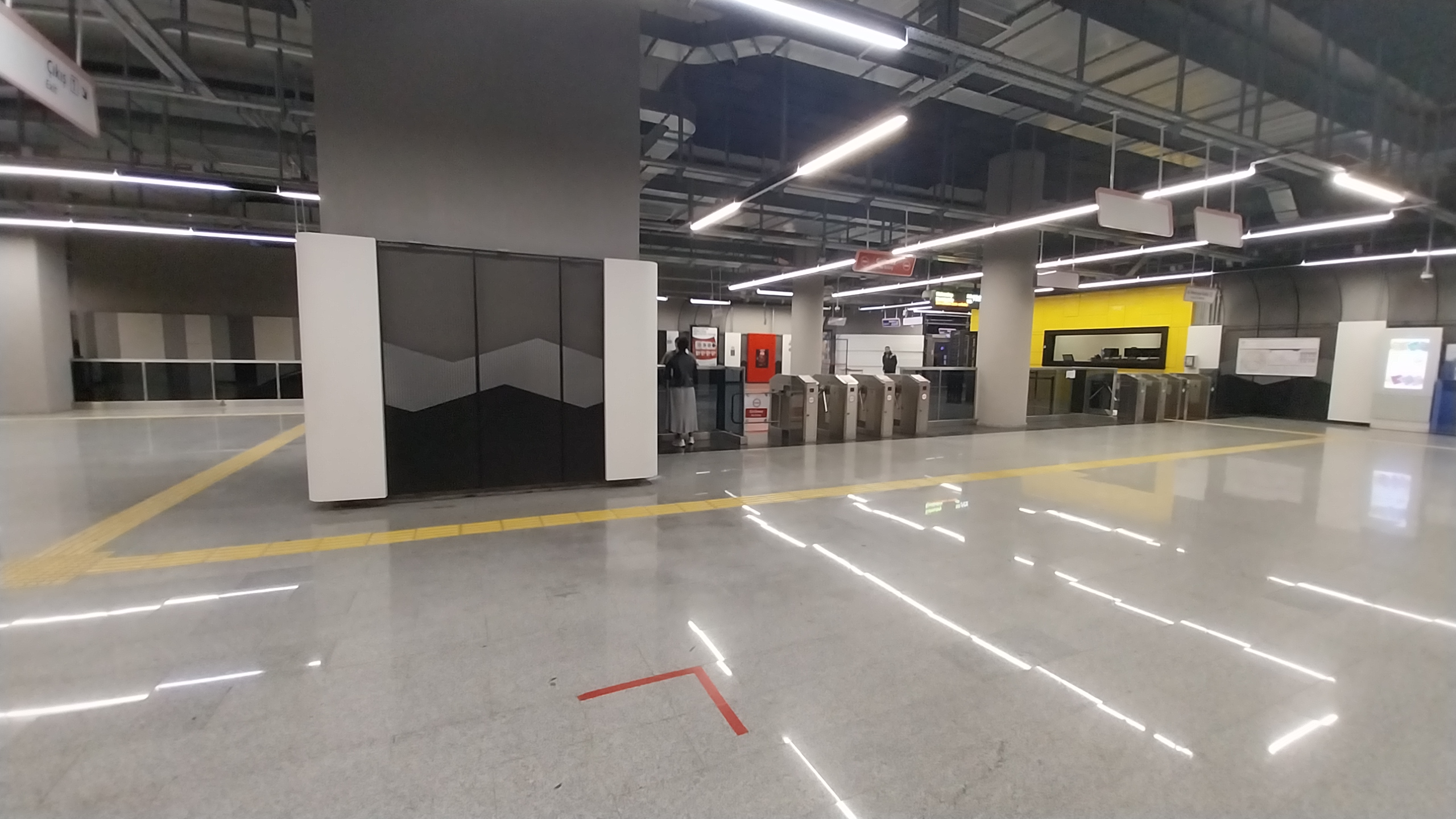
Ticket hall

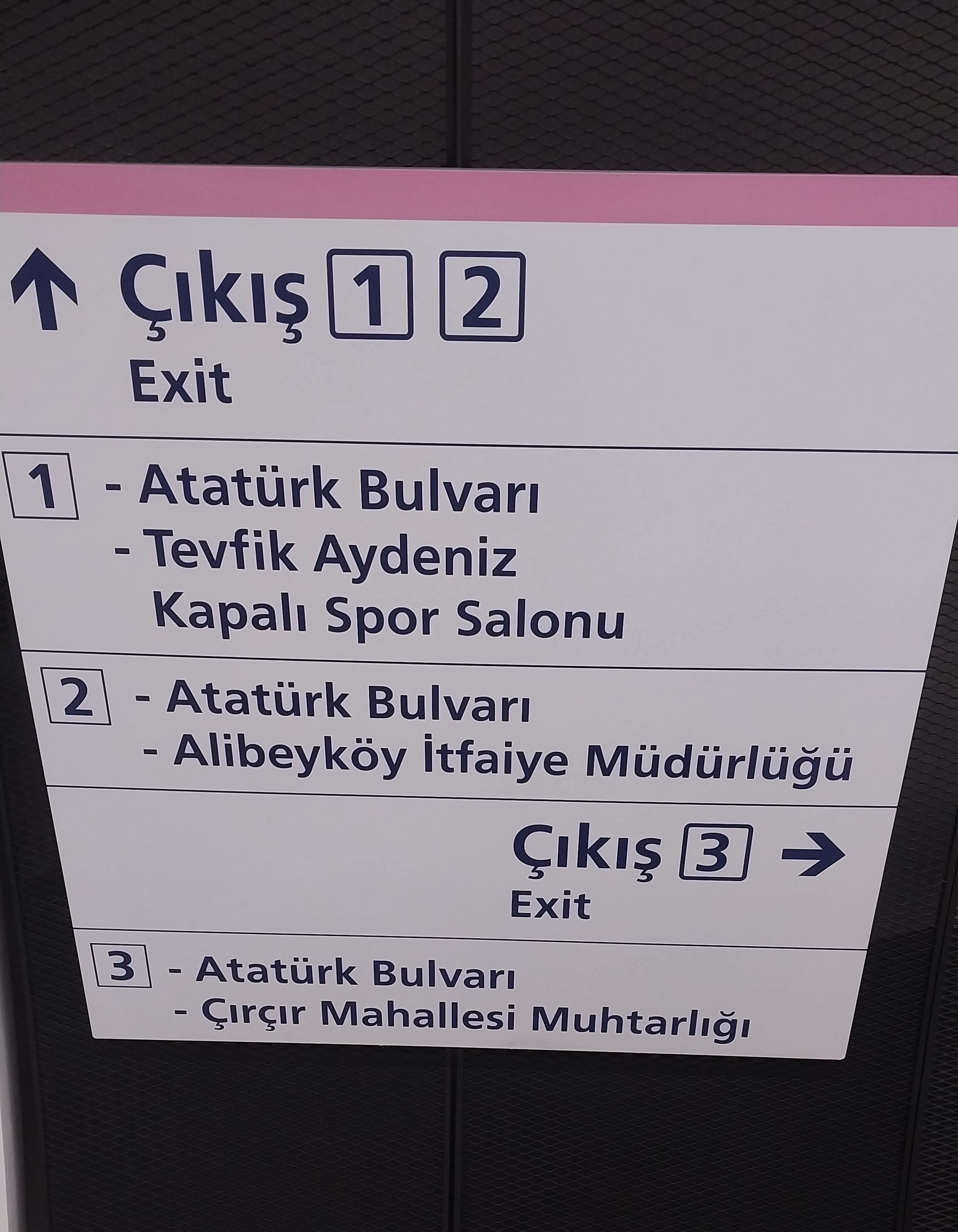
Exit sign

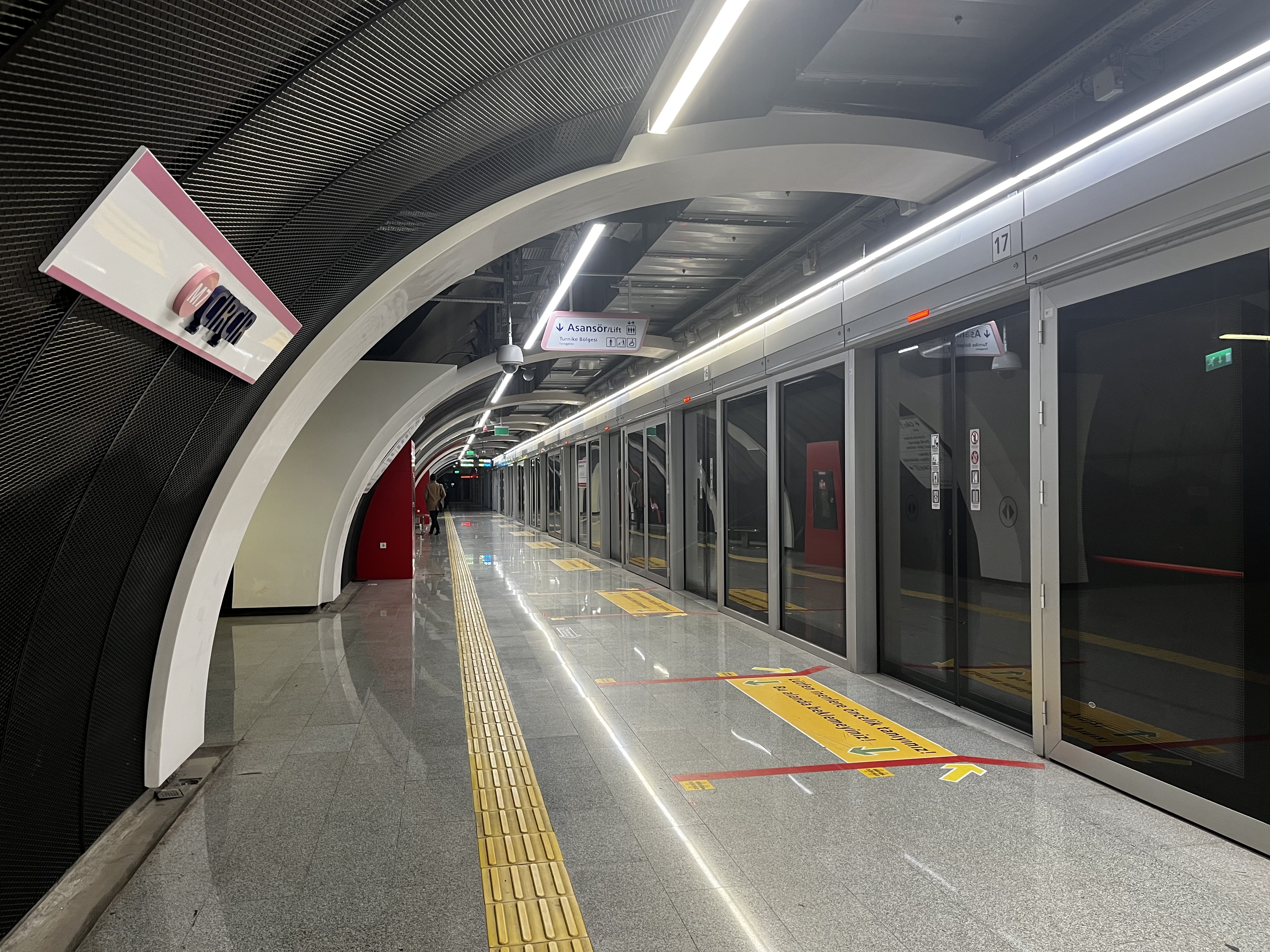
Platform
