= Yeşilpınar station =

Station of the Istanbul Metro

Yeşilpınar
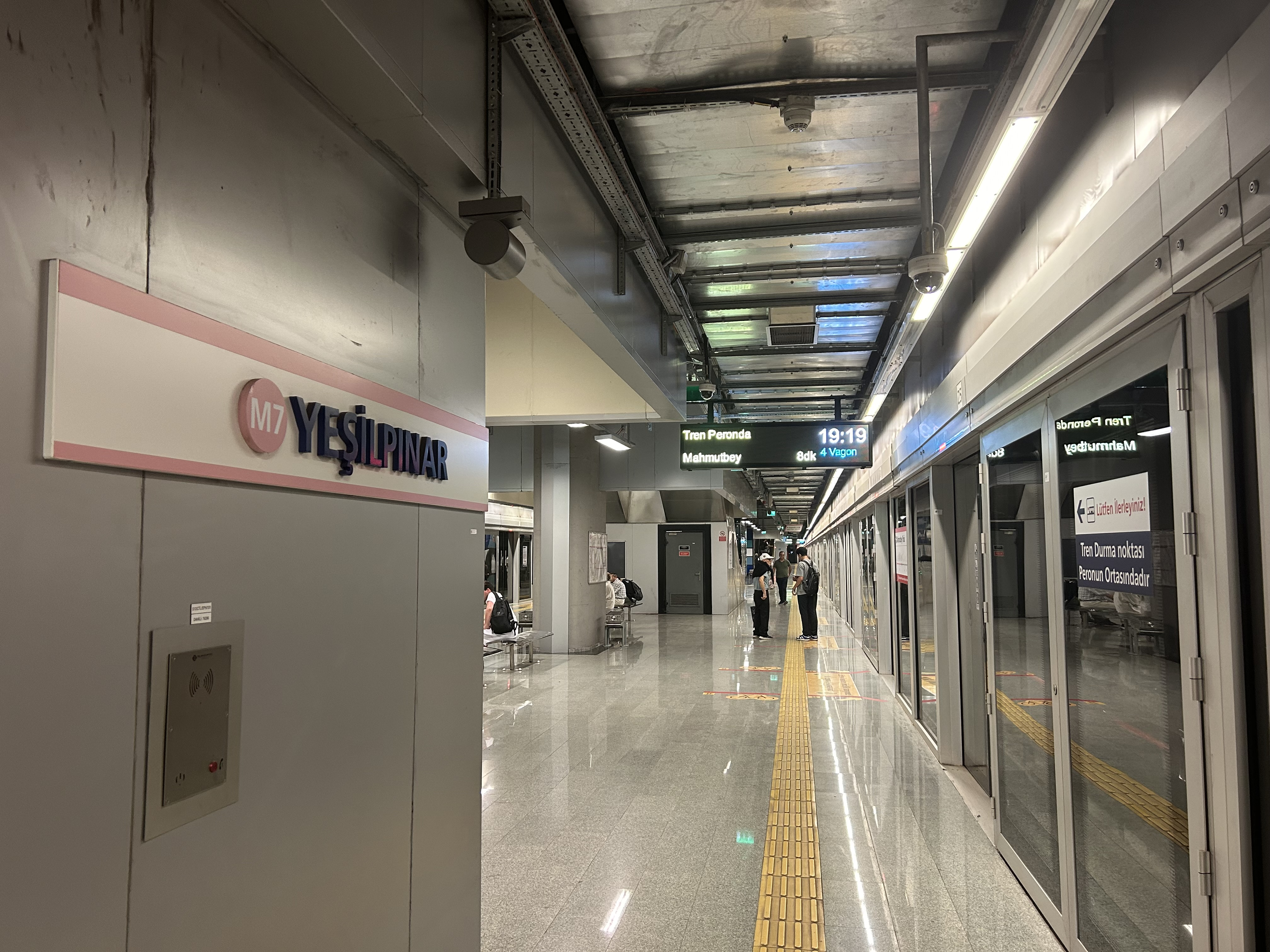
- Platform

General information
- Location: Yeşilpınar Neighborhood, Atatürk Boulevard, 34070; Eyüp, Istanbul; Turkey
- Coordinates: 41°4′56″N 28°55′6″E
- System: Istanbul Metro rapid transit station
- Owner: Istanbul Metropolitan Municipality
- Operator: Istanbul Metro
- Line: M7
- Platforms: 1 Island platform
- Tracks: 2
- Connections: İETT Bus: Mevlana Park: 50AT, TM10, TM11; Istanbul Minibus: Güzeltepe - İstoç, Aksaray-Karayolları Mahallesi, Şişhane-Yunus Emre Mahallesi, Şişli-Yunus Emre Mahallesi, Şişhane-Vialand, Şişli-Vialand

Construction
- Structure type: Underground
- Parking: 269 spaces
- Cycle facilities: Yes
- Accessible: Yes

History
- Opened: 28 October 2020 (5 years ago)
- Electrified: 1,500 V DC Overhead line

Services
Preceding station	Istanbul Metro	Following station
Kâzım Karabekir towards Mahmutbey	M7 Line	Veysel Karani–Akşemsettin towards Yıldız
Location

Yeşilpınar is an underground station on the M7 line of the Istanbul Metro. It is located under Atatürk Boulevard in the Yeşilpınar neighborhood of Eyüp. It was opened on 28 October 2020.

The station has an underground carpark with 269 spaces.

== Station layout ==
Z	Enter/Exit ↓ (1)	Enter/Exit ↓ (3)	Enter/Exit ↓ (2)
B1	Underpass →	Ticket Hall↓	← Underpass
B2	Platform	Platform	Platform

Platform level	Westbound	← toward Mahmutbey (Kâzım Karabekir)
Platform level	Island platform, doors will open on the left
Platform level	Eastbound	toward Mecidiyeköy (Veysel Karani-Akşemsettin) →

== Operation information ==
The M7 line operates between 06:00 and 00:00 with a train frequency of 6 minutes at peak hours and 7.5 minutes at all other times. The line also operates night metro services between 00:00 and 06:00 on Saturdays and Sundays, with trains running every 30 minutes. This provides 66 hours of uninterrupted service between Friday and Sunday. During these hours, fares are charged at double the price. During this time, Entrances 2 and 3 are open, whilst Entrance 1 is closed.

== Gallery ==
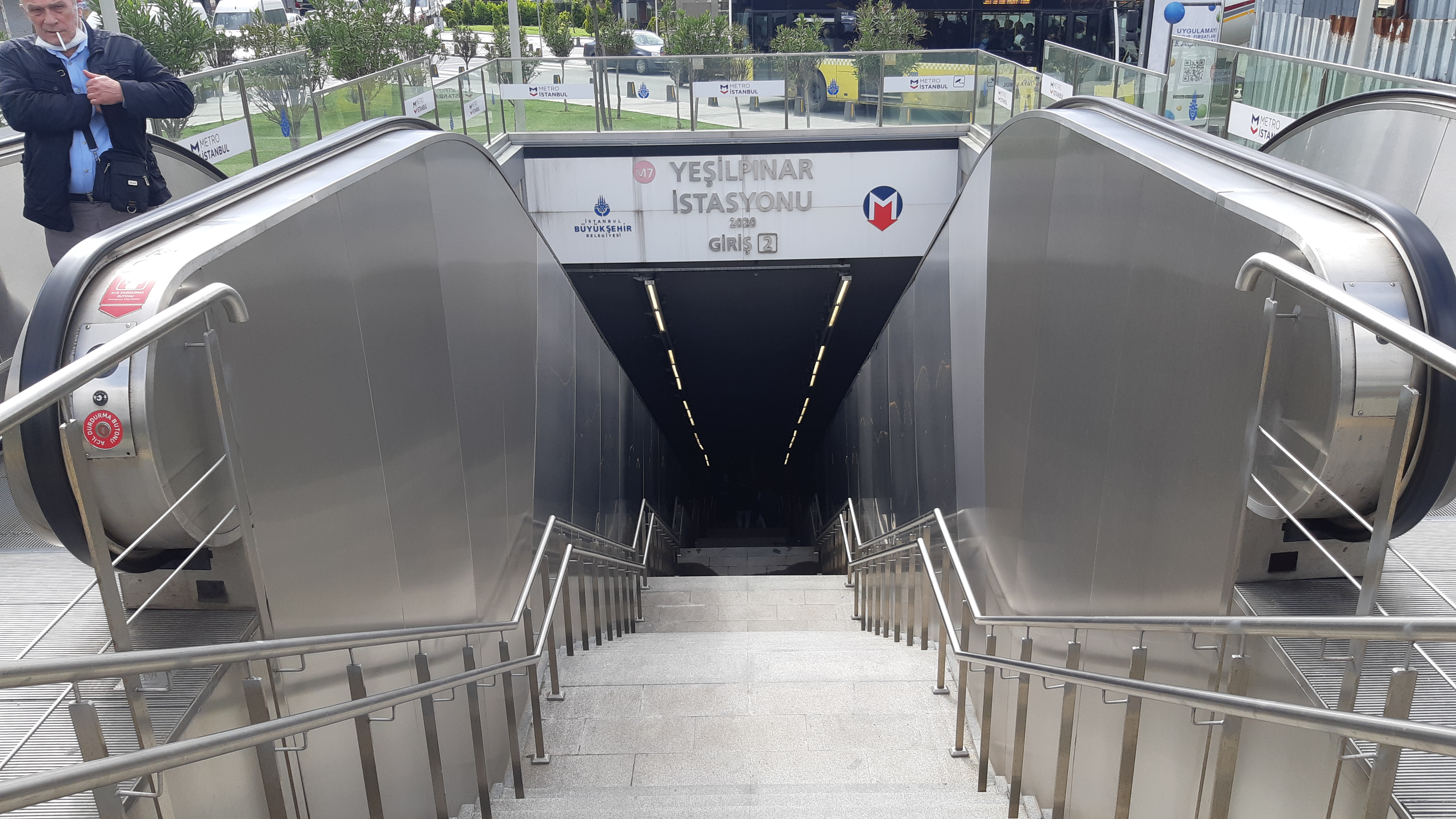
Entrance 2

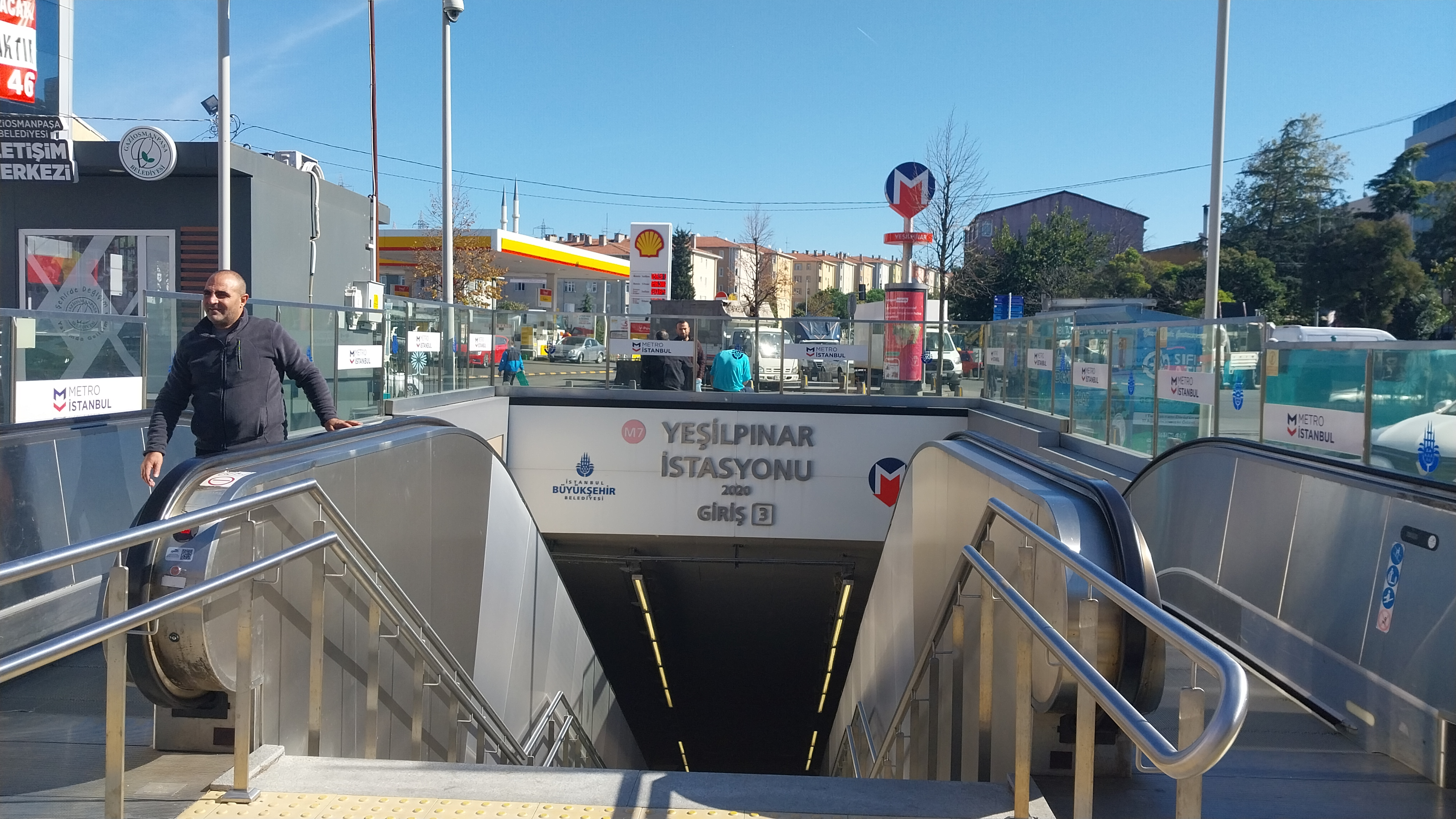
Entrance 3

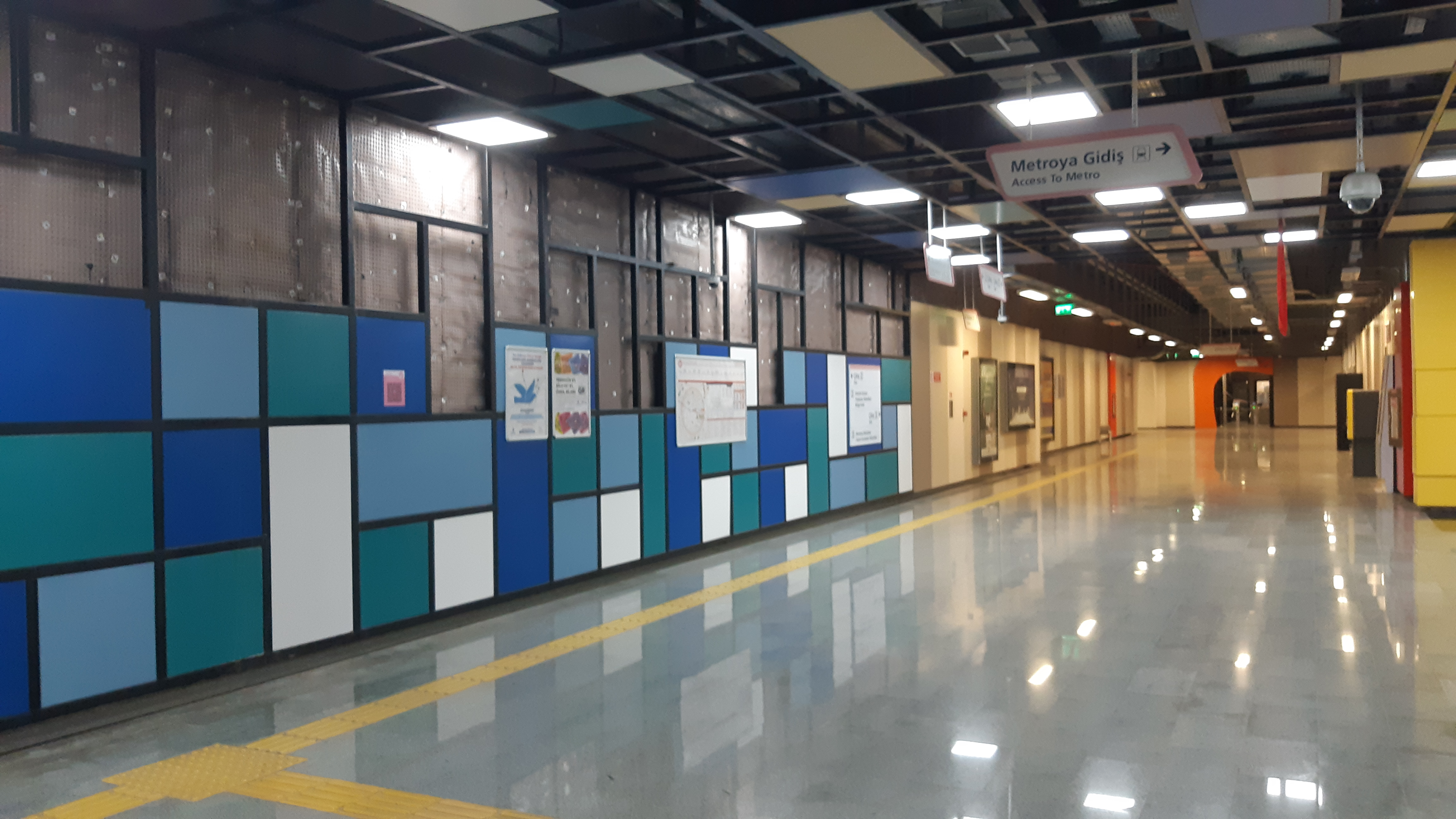
Ticket hall

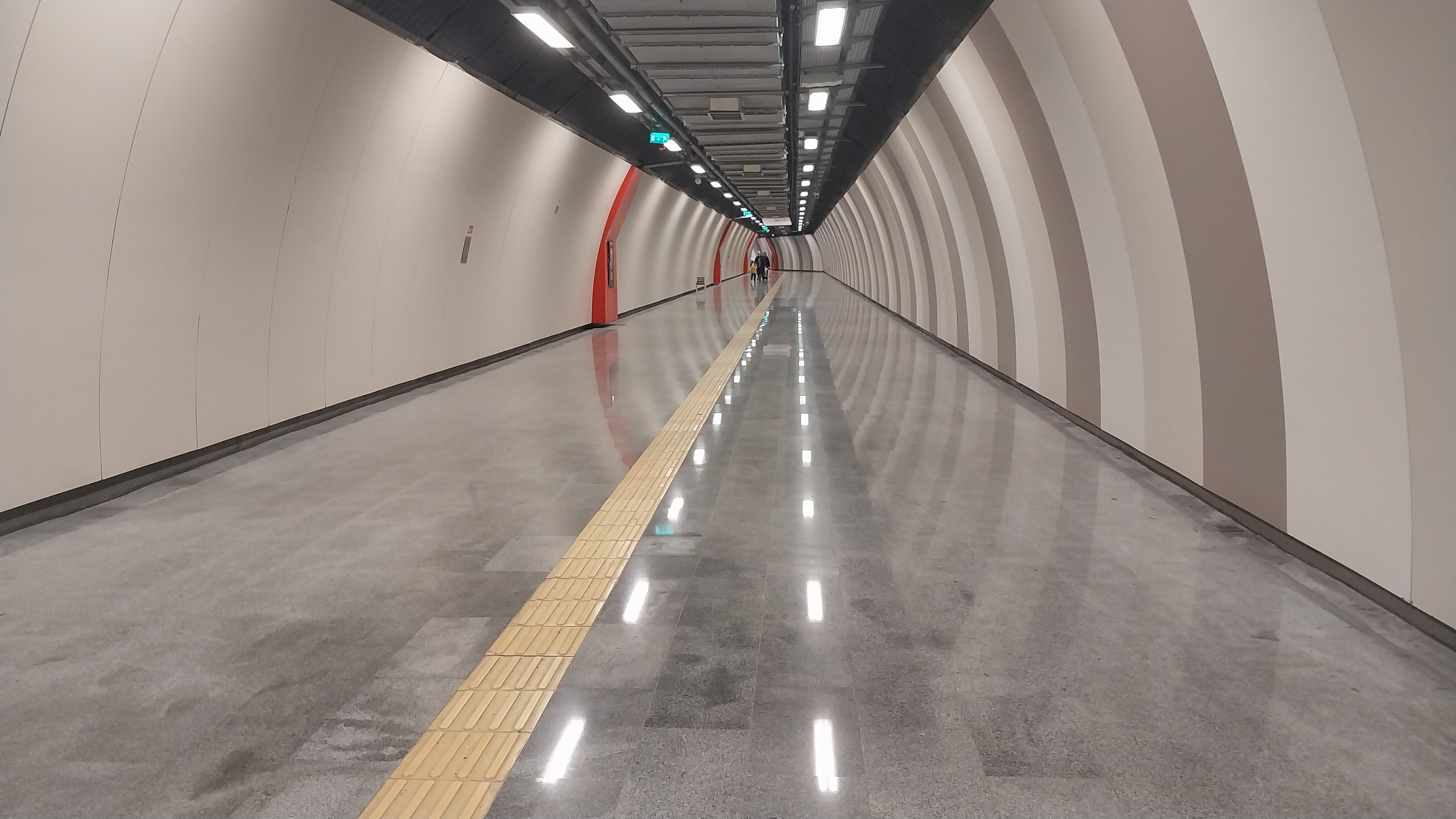
Pedestrian underpass

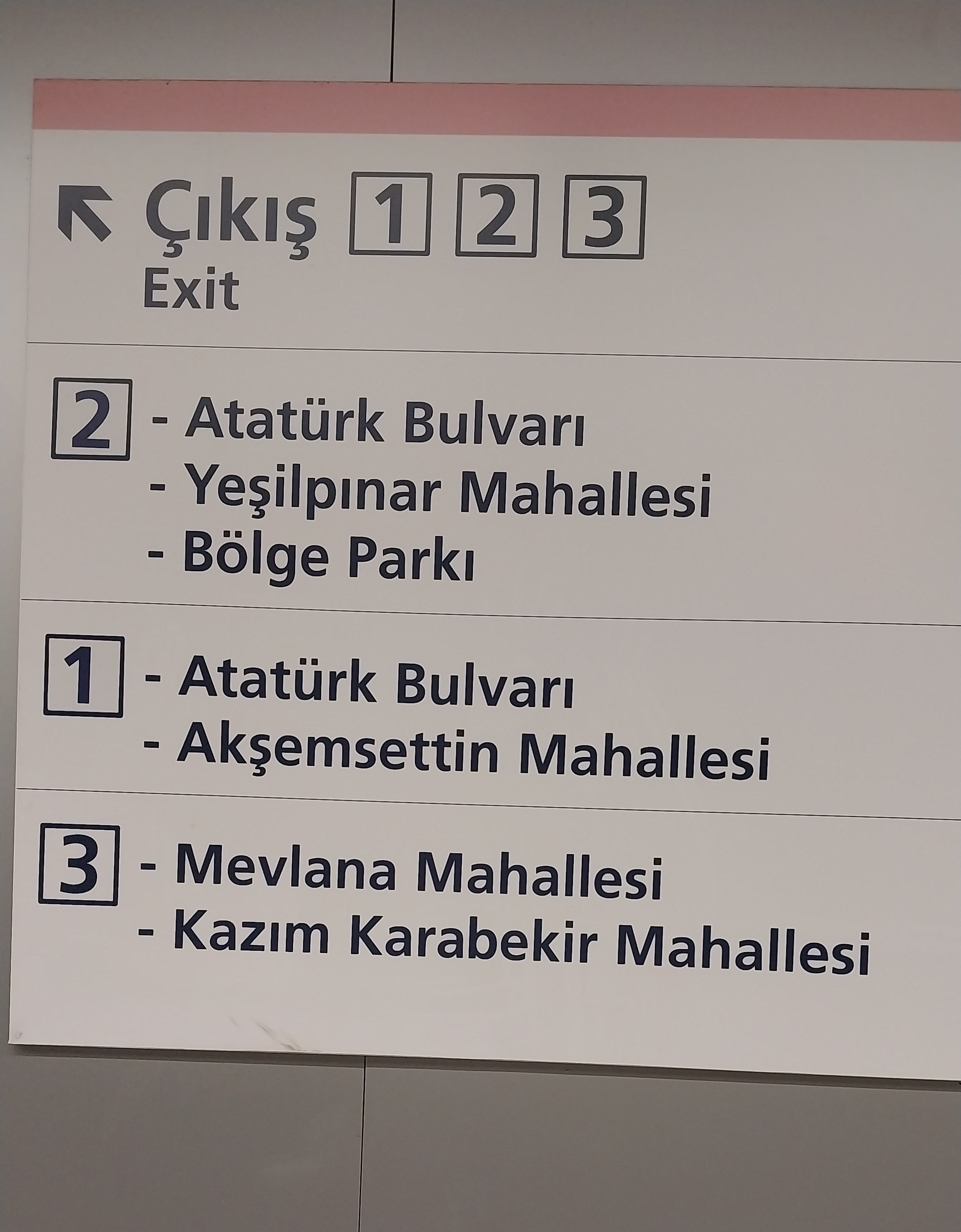
Exit sign

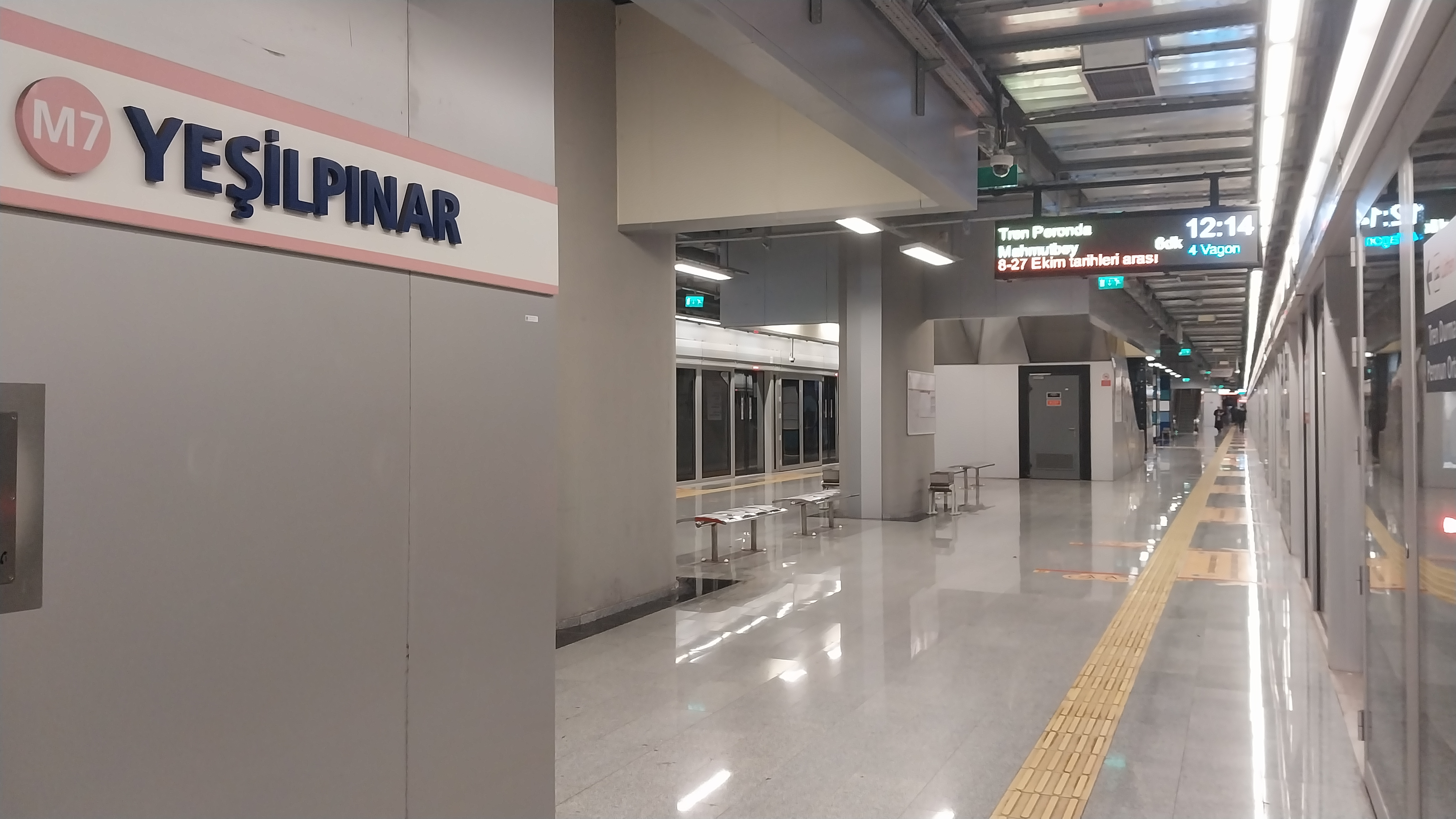
Platform

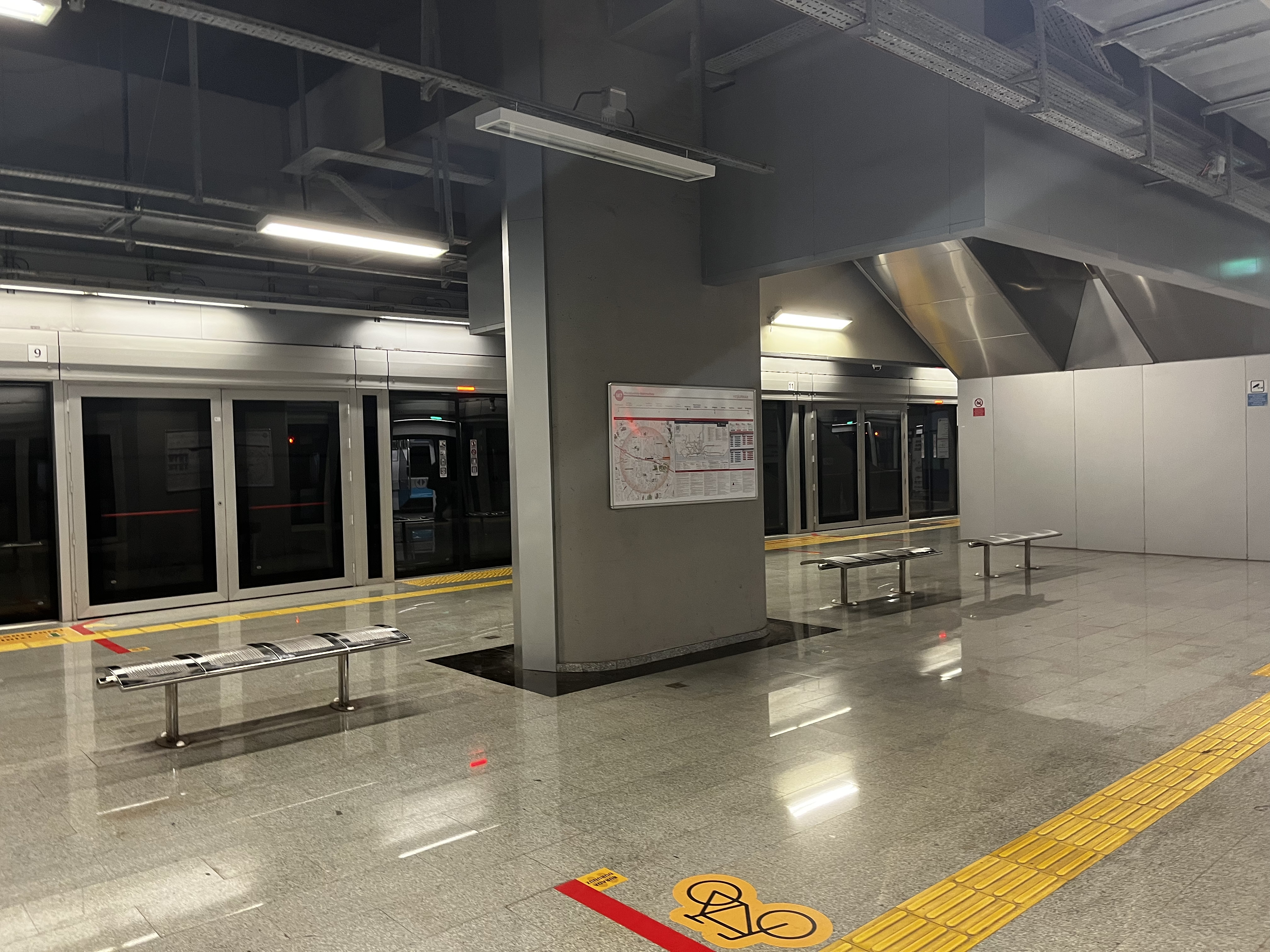
Platform level

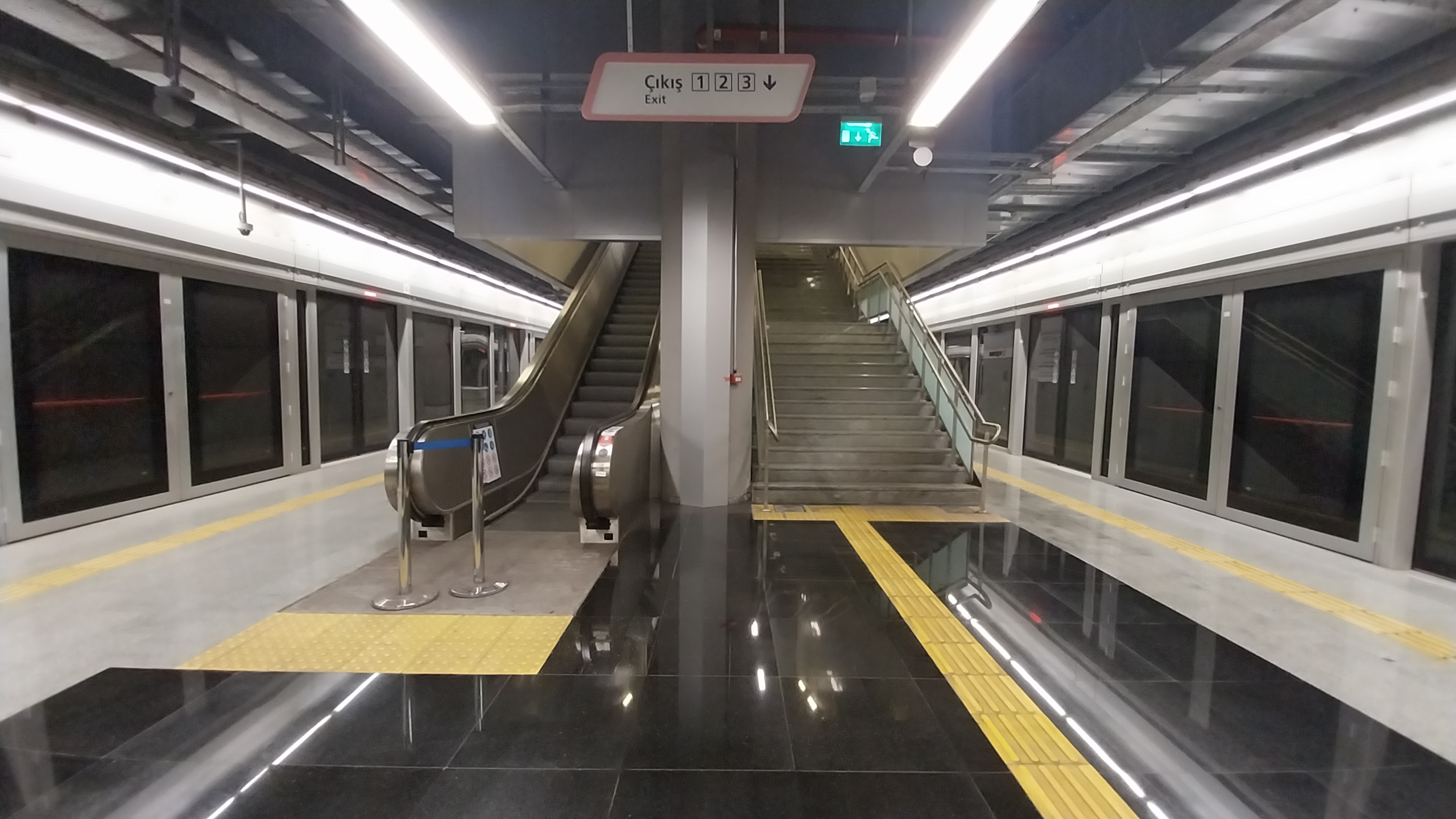
Stairs
