= Yenimahalle station (M7) =

Station of the Istanbul Metro

Yenimahalle
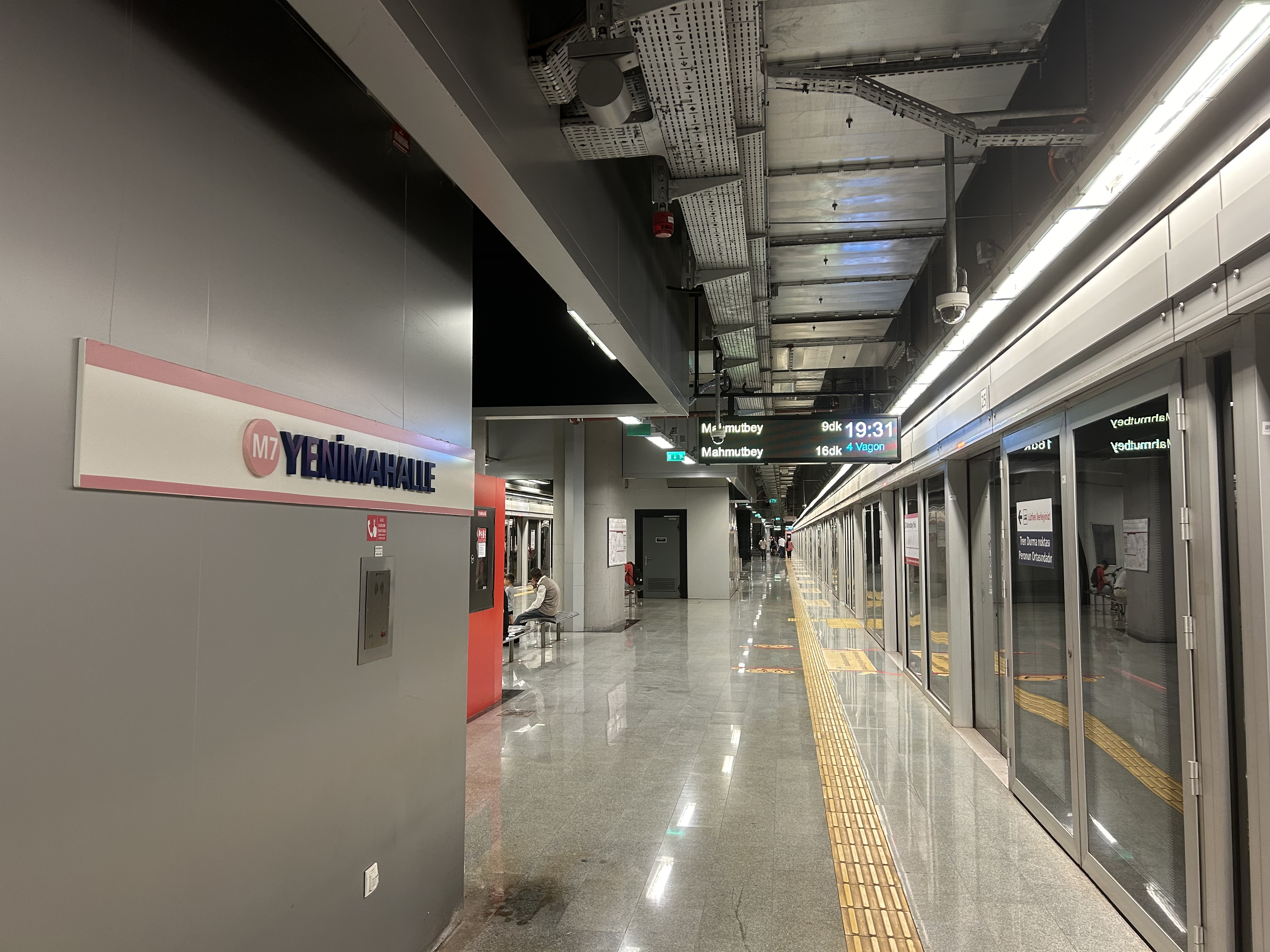
- Platform

General information
- Location: Karayolları Neighborhood, Galeri Street, 34225; Gaziosmanpaşa, Istanbul; Turkey
- Coordinates: 41°5′2″N 28°53′32″E
- System: Istanbul Metro rapid transit station
- Owner: Istanbul Metropolitan Municipality
- Operator: Istanbul Metro
- Line: M7
- Platforms: 1 Island platform
- Tracks: 2
- Connections: İETT Bus: Gaziosmanpaşa Belediye Parkı & Yenimahalle Metro: 36, 36ES, 38, 38E, 38KE, HT5, TM9, TM4, TM16; Istanbul Minibus: Gaziosmanpaşa - Esentepe, Cebeci Mahallesi - Topkapı

Construction
- Structure type: Underground
- Parking: 114 spaces
- Cycle facilities: Yes
- Accessible: Yes

History
- Opened: 28 October 2020 (5 years ago)
- Electrified: 1,500 V DC Overhead line

Services
| Preceding station | Istanbul Metro | Following station |
|---|---|---|
| Karadeniz Mahallesi towards Mahmutbey | M7 Line | Kâzım Karabekir towards Yıldız |
Location

Yenimahalle is an underground station on the M7 line of the Istanbul Metro. It is located under Galeri Street in the Karayolları neighborhood of Gaziosmanpaşa. It was opened on 28 October 2020.

The station has an underground carpark with 114 spaces.

== Station layout ==
| Z | Enter/Exit ↓ (1–2) | Enter/Exit ↓ (3) |
| B1 | Ticket Hall↓↙↘ | ← Underpass |
| B2 | Platform | Platform |

| Platform level | Westbound | ← toward Mahmutbey (Karadeniz Mahallesi) |
| Platform level | Island platform, doors will open on the left |
| Platform level | Eastbound | toward Mecidiyeköy (Kâzım Karabekir) → |

== Operation information ==
The M7 line operates between 06:00 and 00:00 with a train frequency of 6 minutes at peak hours and 7.5 minutes at all other times. The line also operates night metro services between 00:00 and 06:00 on Saturdays and Sundays, with trains running every 30 minutes. This provides 66 hours of uninterrupted service between Friday and Sunday. During these hours, fares are charged at double the price. During this time, Entrances 2 and 3 are open, whilst Entrance 1 is closed.

== Gallery ==
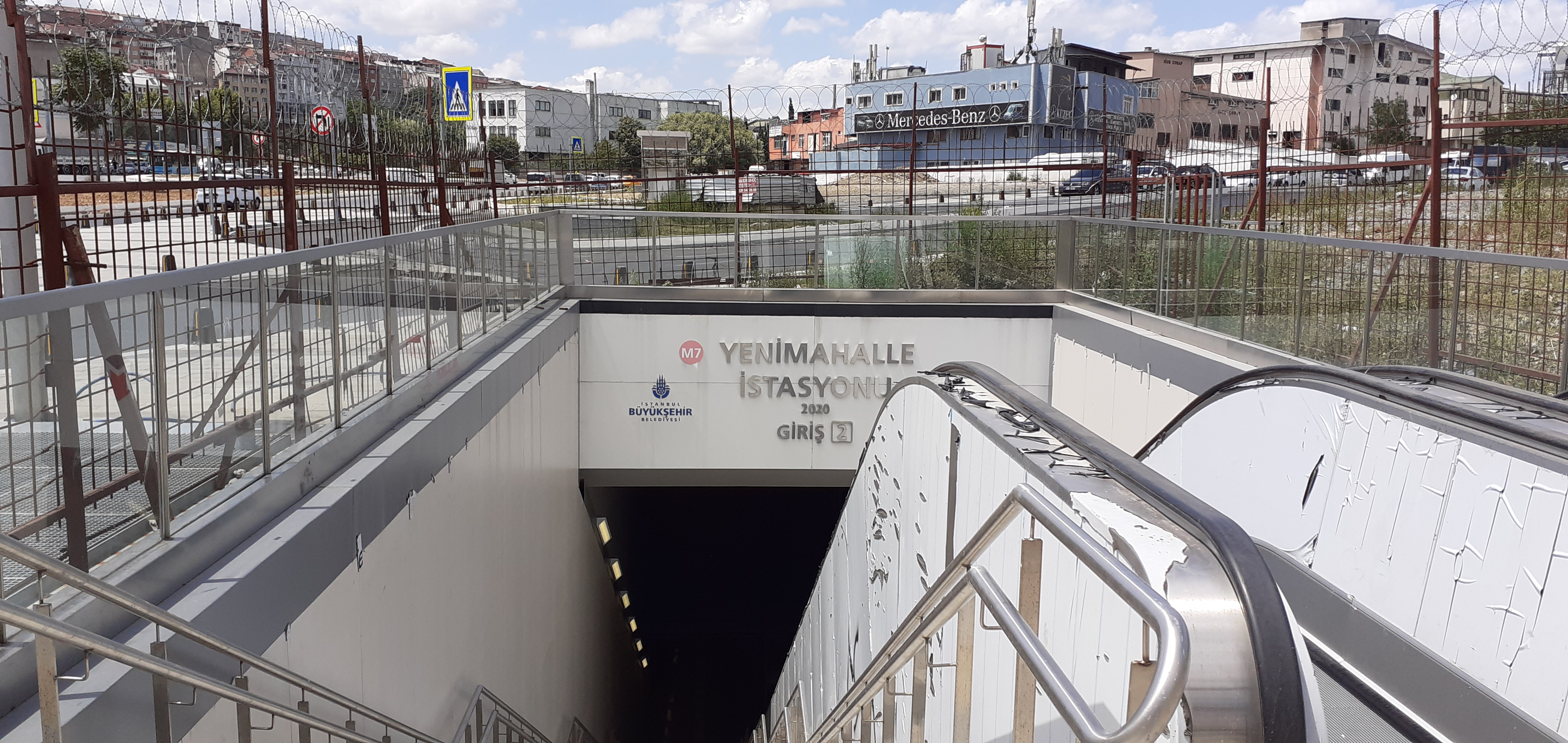
Under construction (September 2020)

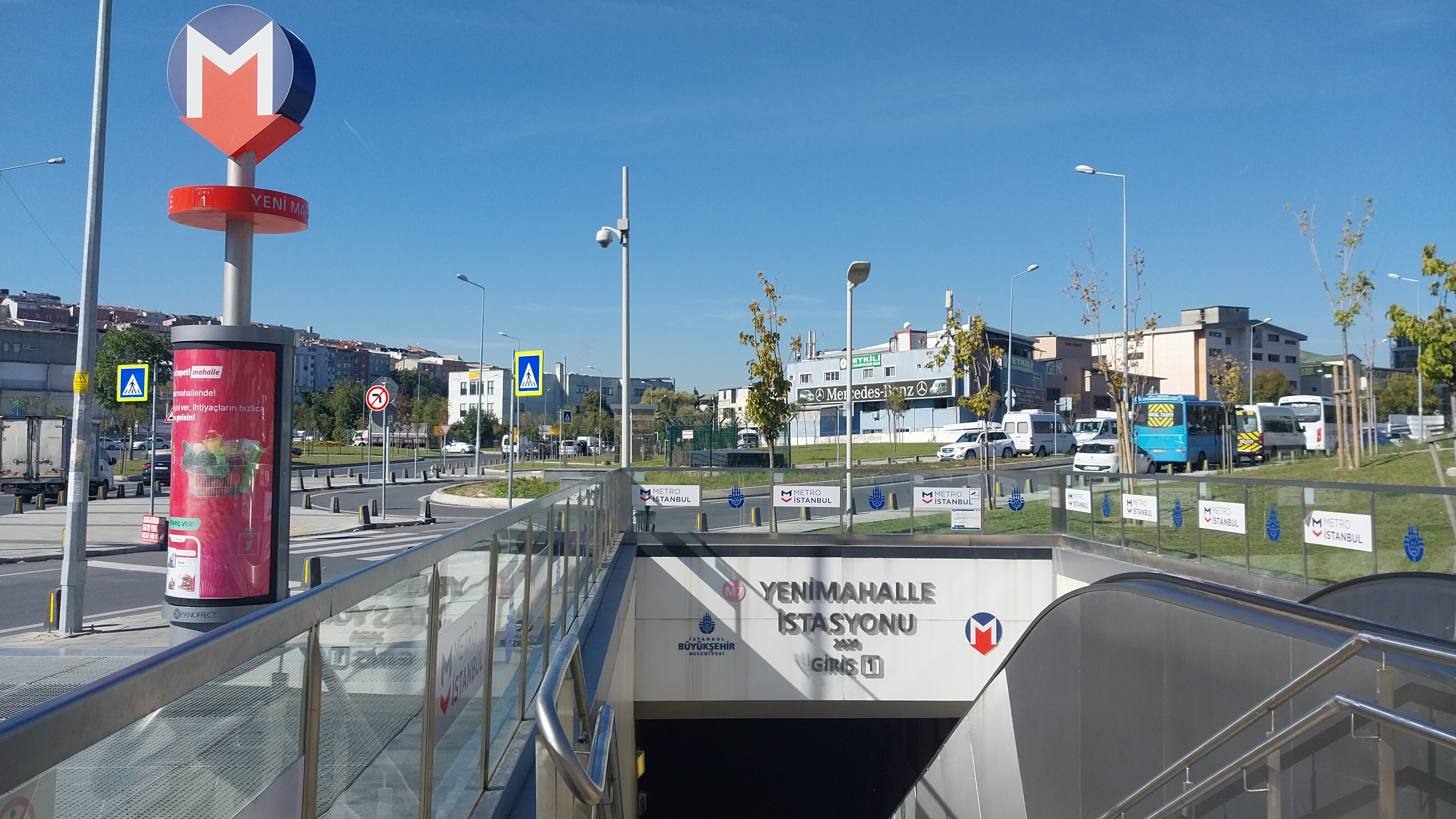
Entrance 1

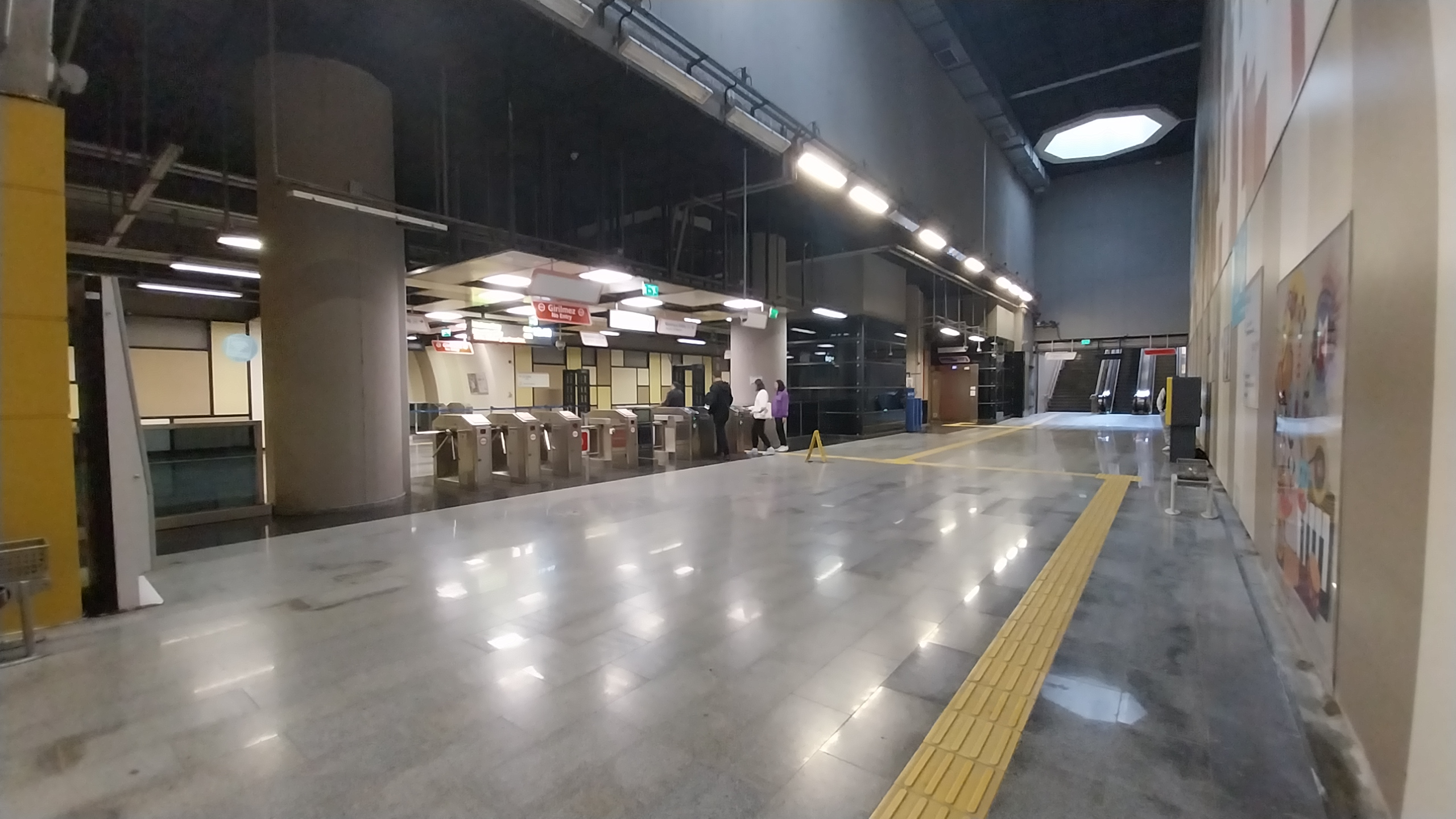
Ticket hall

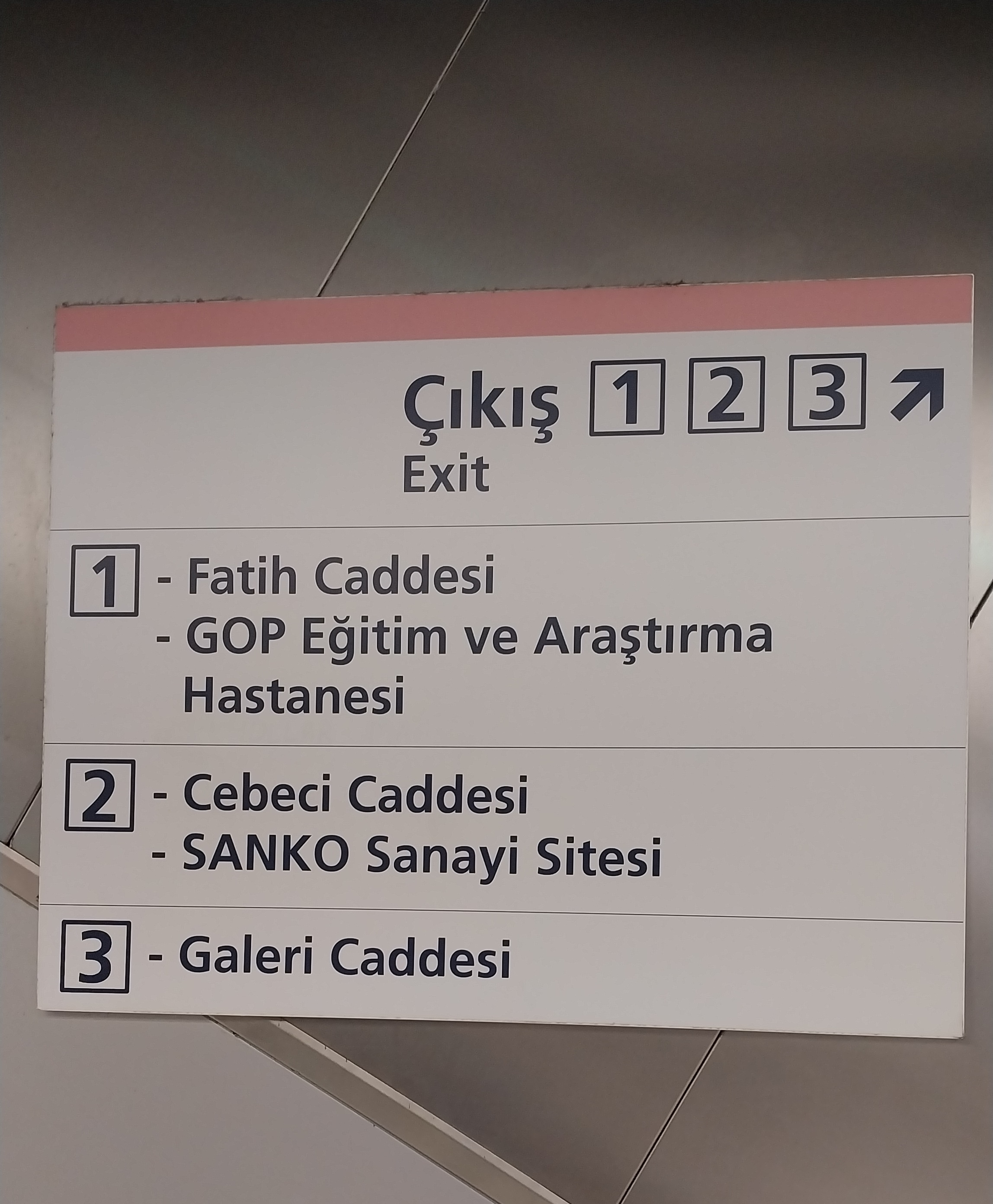
Exit sign

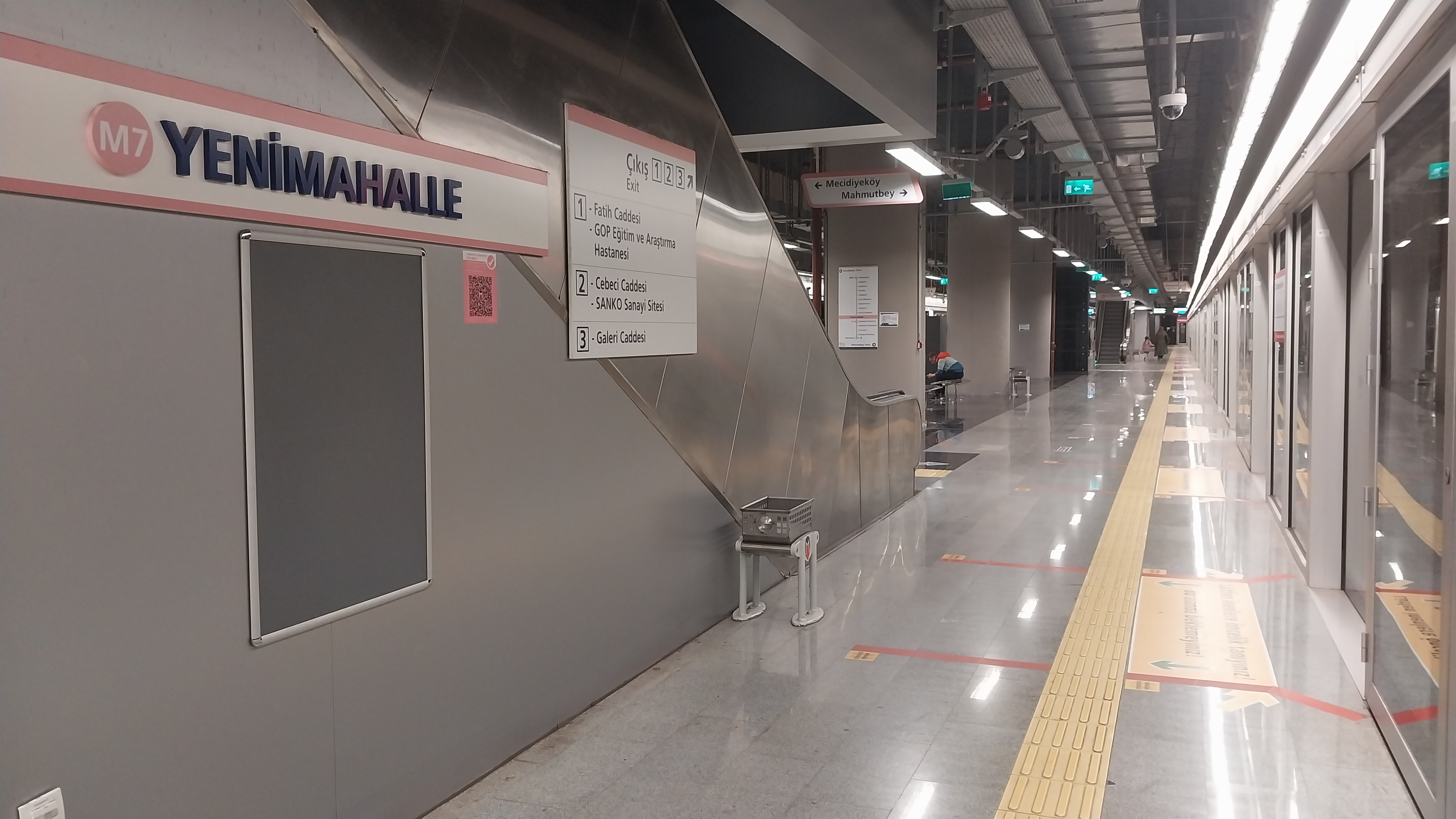
Platform
