= Oruç Reis station =

Station of the Istanbul Metro

Oruç Reis
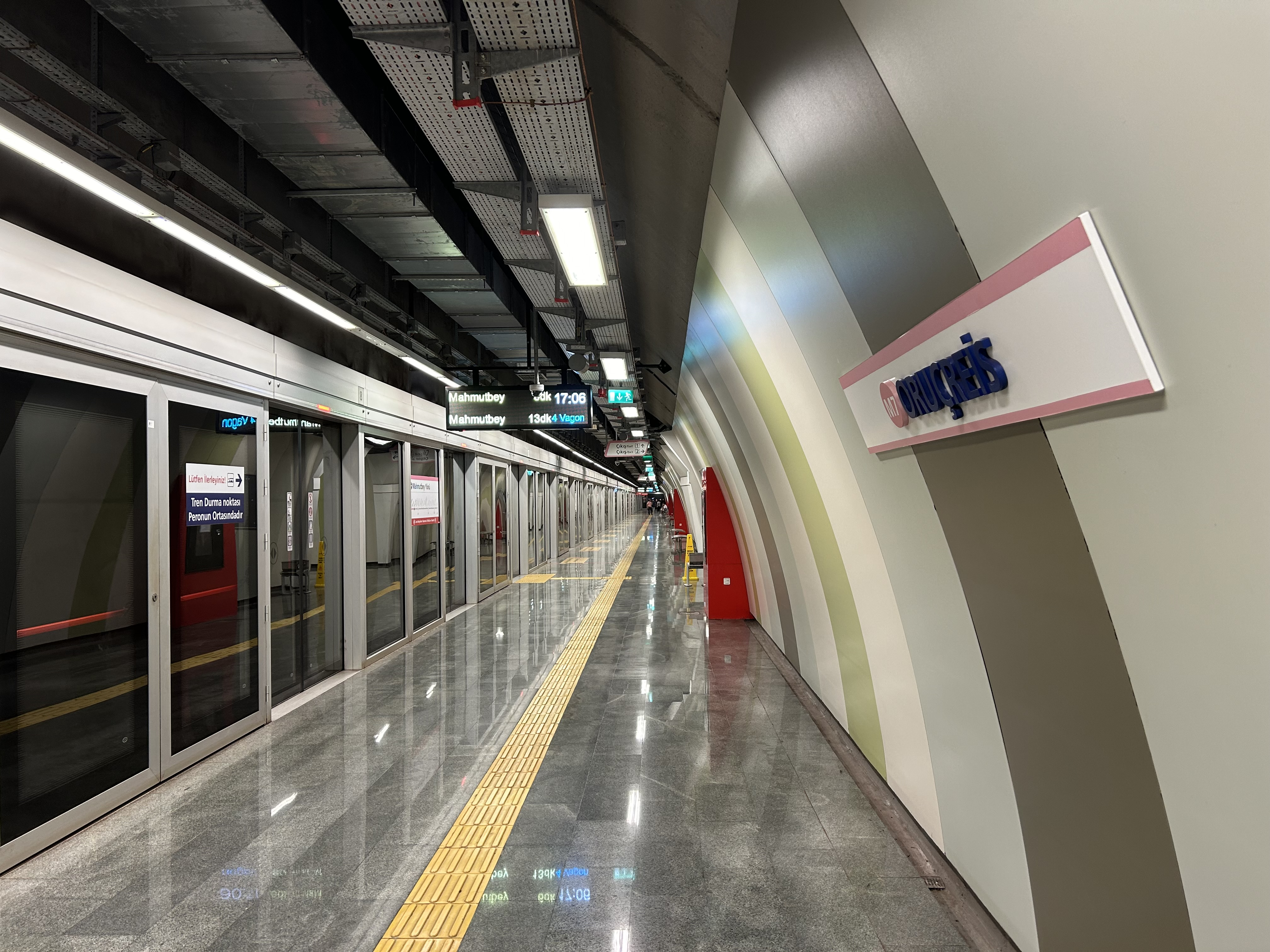
- Platform

General information
- Location: Oruçreis Neighborhood, Barbaros Street, 34235; Esenler, Istanbul; Turkey
- Coordinates: 41°3′46″N 28°51′19″E
- System: Istanbul Metro rapid transit station
- Owner: Istanbul Metropolitan Municipality
- Operator: Istanbul Metro
- Line: M7
- Platforms: 1 Island platform
- Tracks: 2
- Connections: İETT Bus:,br>Yeni Camii: 33Y, 98Y, HT11; Istanbul Minibus: Topkapı - Bağcılar - Giyimkent, Topkapı - Bağcılar - Yüzyıl Mahallesi, Topkapı - Atışalanı - Yüzyıl Mahallesi

Construction
- Structure type: Underground
- Parking: No
- Cycle facilities: Yes
- Accessible: Yes

History
- Opened: 28 October 2020 (5 years ago)
- Electrified: 1,500 V DC Overhead line

Services
Preceding station	Istanbul Metro	Following station
Göztepe Mahallesi towards Mahmutbey	M7 Line	Giyimkent–Tekstilkent towards Yıldız
Location

Oruç Reis (Oruç Reis-Yüzyıl) is an underground station on the M7 line of the Istanbul Metro. It is located under Barbaros Street in the Oruçreis neighborhood of Esenler. It was opened on 28 October 2020.

== Station layout ==
Z	↘↓ Enter/Exit (1)	Enter/Exit ↘↓ (2) ↙
B1	↓↓↓↓ Ticket Hall	↙↓↓ Ticket Hall
B2	Passageway ↙
B3	Platform

Platform level	Westbound	← toward Mahmutbey (Göztepe Mahallesi)
Platform level	Island platform, doors will open on the left
Platform level	Eastbound	toward Mecidiyeköy (Giyimkent-Tekstilkent) →

== Operation information ==
The M7 line operates between 06:00 and 00:00 with a train frequency of 6 minutes at peak hours and 7.5 minutes at all other times. The line also operates night metro services between 00:00 and 06:00 on Saturdays and Sundays, with trains running every 30 minutes. This provides 66 hours of uninterrupted service between Friday and Sunday. During these hours, fares are charged at double the price. During this time, Entrance 1 is open and Entrance 2 is closed.

== Gallery ==
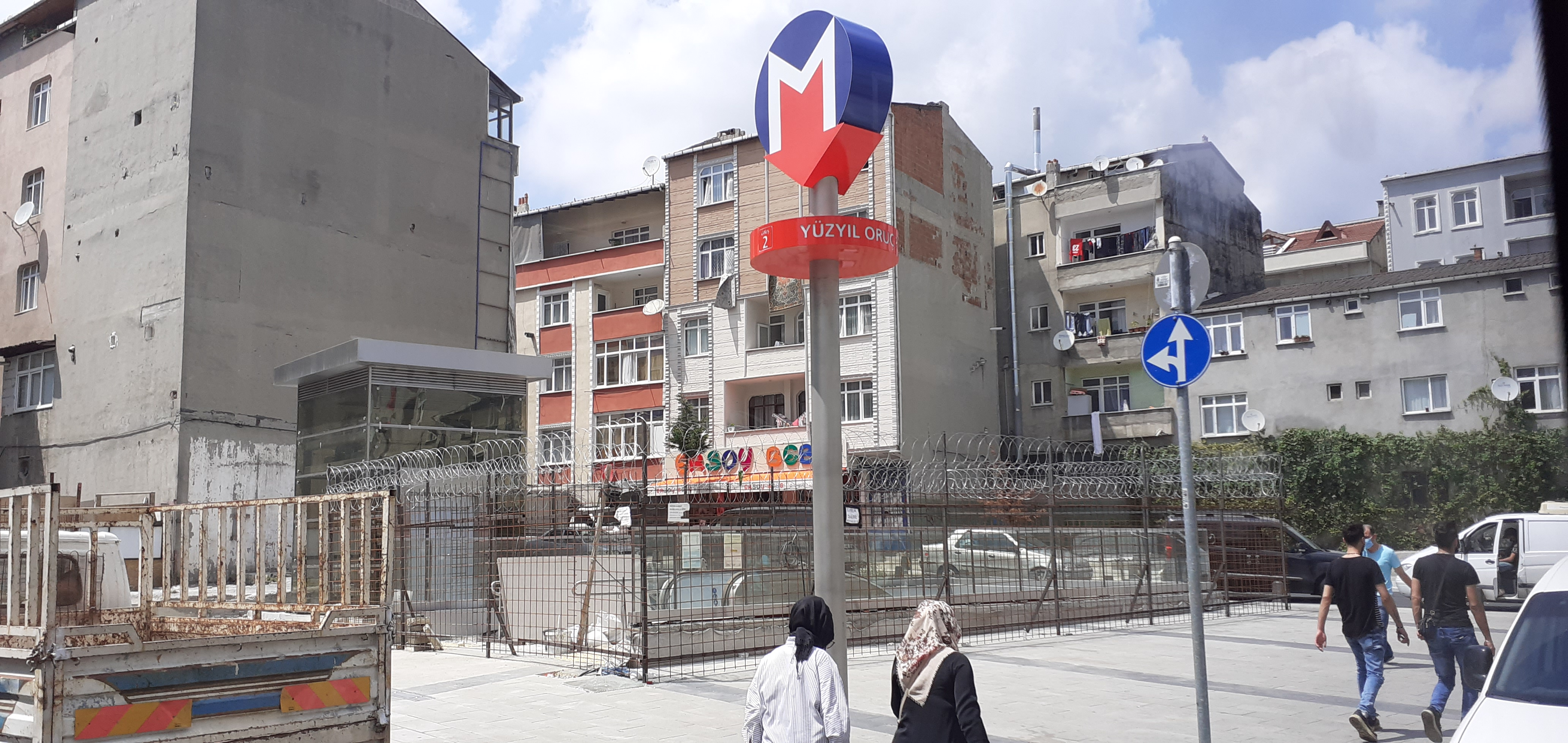
Under construction (September 2020)

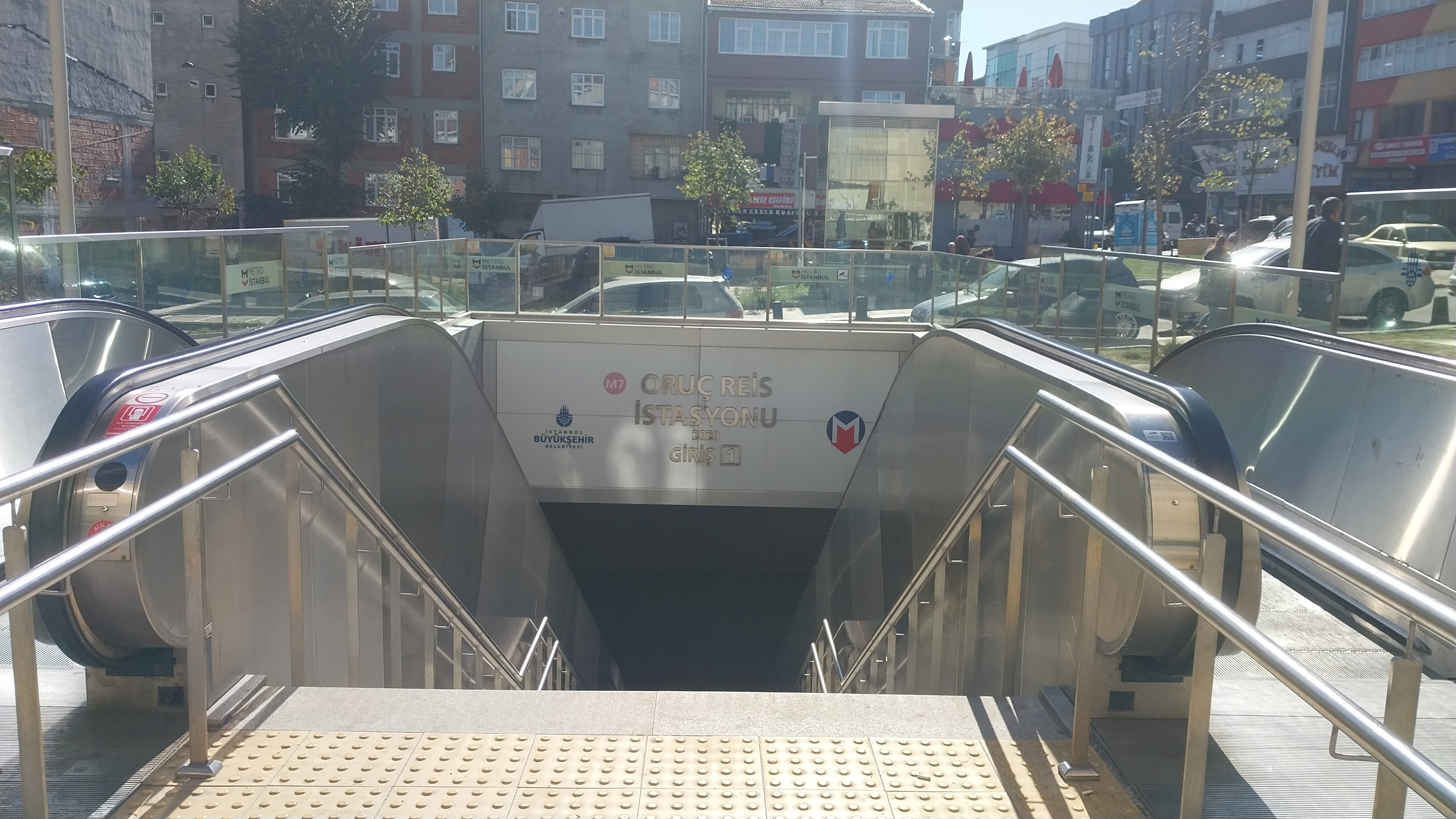
Entrance 1

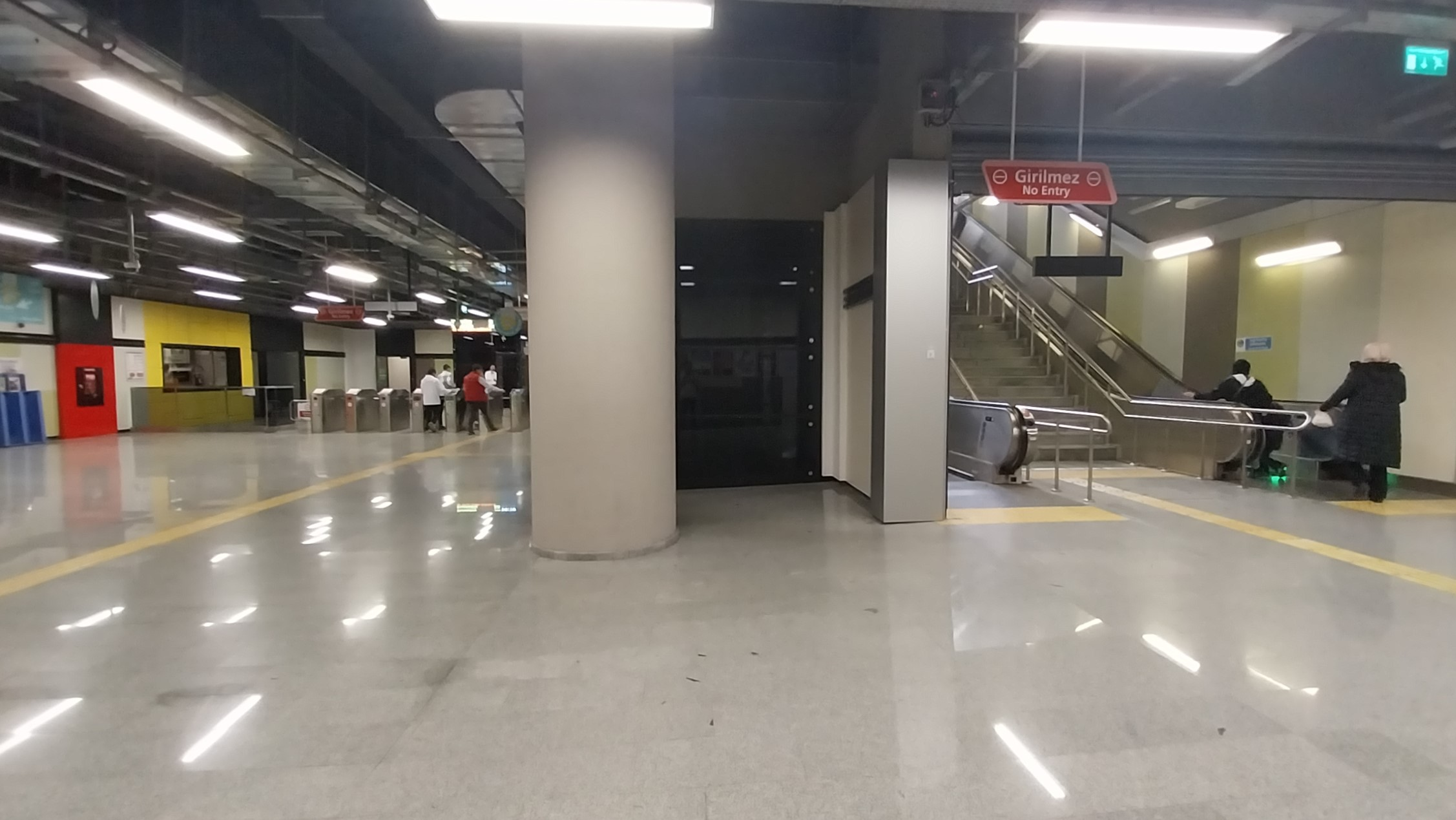
Ticket hall

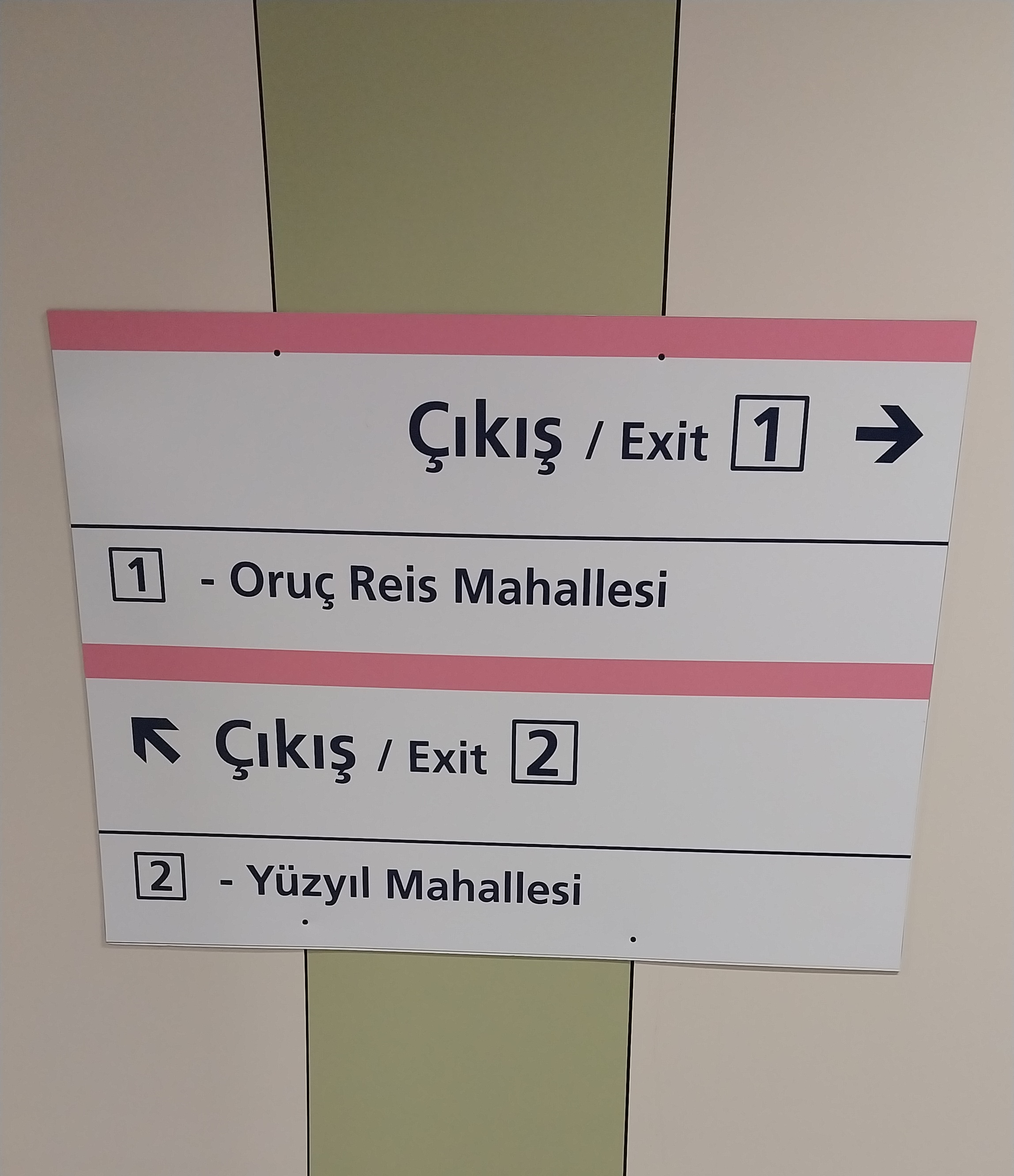
Exit sign

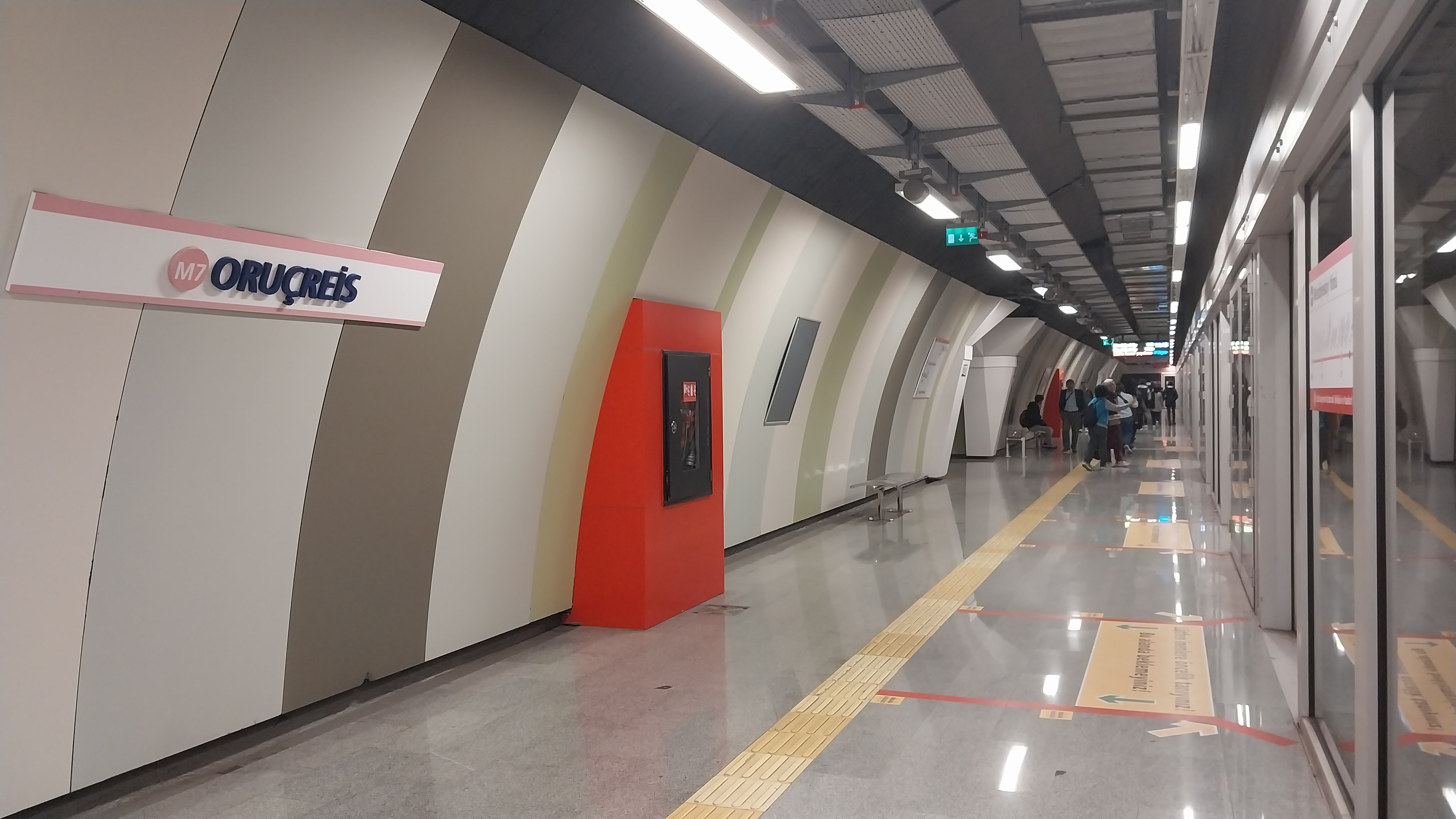
Platform
