= Giyimkent–Tekstilkent station =

Station of the Istanbul Metro

Giyimkent-Tekstilkent
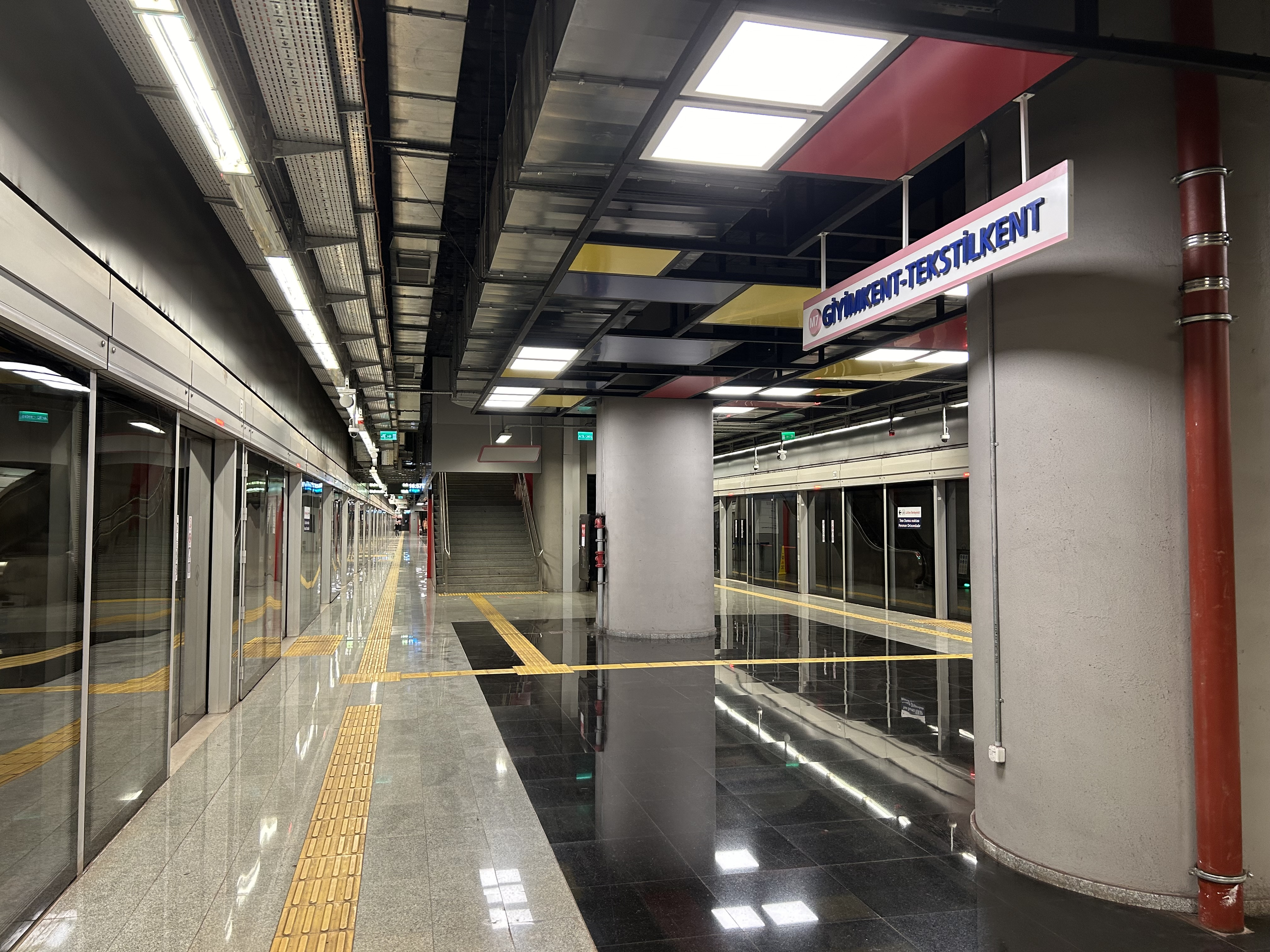
- Platform

General information
- Location: Oruçreis Neighborhood, Giyimkent Street, 34235; Esenler, Istanbul; Turkey
- Coordinates: 41°4′17″N 28°52′0″E
- System: Istanbul Metro rapid transit station
- Owner: Istanbul Metropolitan Municipality
- Operator: Istanbul Metro
- Line: M7
- Platforms: 1 Island platform
- Tracks: 2
- Connections: İETT Bus: 33, 33B, 33ES, 33M, 33TE, 33TM, 33Y, 98G, 98Y, HT11, MK53; Istanbul Minibus: Topkapı - Bağcılar - Giyimkent, Şirinevler - Giyimkent, Merter - Giyimkent

Construction
- Structure type: Underground
- Parking: 203 spaces
- Cycle facilities: Yes
- Accessible: Yes

History
- Opened: 28 October 2020 (5 years ago)
- Electrified: 1,500 V DC Overhead line

Services
Preceding station	Istanbul Metro	Following station
Oruç Reis towards Mahmutbey	M7 Line	Karadeniz Mahallesi towards Yıldız
Location

Giyimkent-Tekstilkent is an underground station on the M7 line of the Istanbul Metro. It is located under Giyimkent Street in the Oruçreis neighborhood of Esenler. It was opened on 28 October 2020.

Tekstilkent Depot, the main depot for the M7 line, is located north of the station.

The station has an underground carpark with 203 spaces.

== Station layout ==
Z	↓↘ Enter/Exit ↙ (1–2)
B1	Passageway ↘	~~Enter/Exit ↙~~; ~~(4—Carpark)~~	Enter/Exit ↓↙ (3)	Z
B2	Underpass →	↙↘↓ Ticket Hall ↙↘	← Underpass	B1
B3	Platform			B2

Platform level	Westbound	← toward Mahmutbey (Oruç Reis)
Platform level	Island platform, doors will open on the left
Platform level	Eastbound	toward Mecidiyeköy (Karadeniz Mahallesi) →

== Operation information ==
The M7 line operates between 06:00 and 00:00 with a train frequency of 6 minutes at peak hours and 7.5 minutes at all other times. The line also operates night metro services between 00:00 and 06:00 on Saturdays and Sundays, with trains running every 30 minutes. This provides 66 hours of uninterrupted service between Friday and Sunday. During these hours, fares are charged at double the price. During this time, Entrance 2 is open, whilst Entrances 1 and 3 are closed.

== Gallery ==
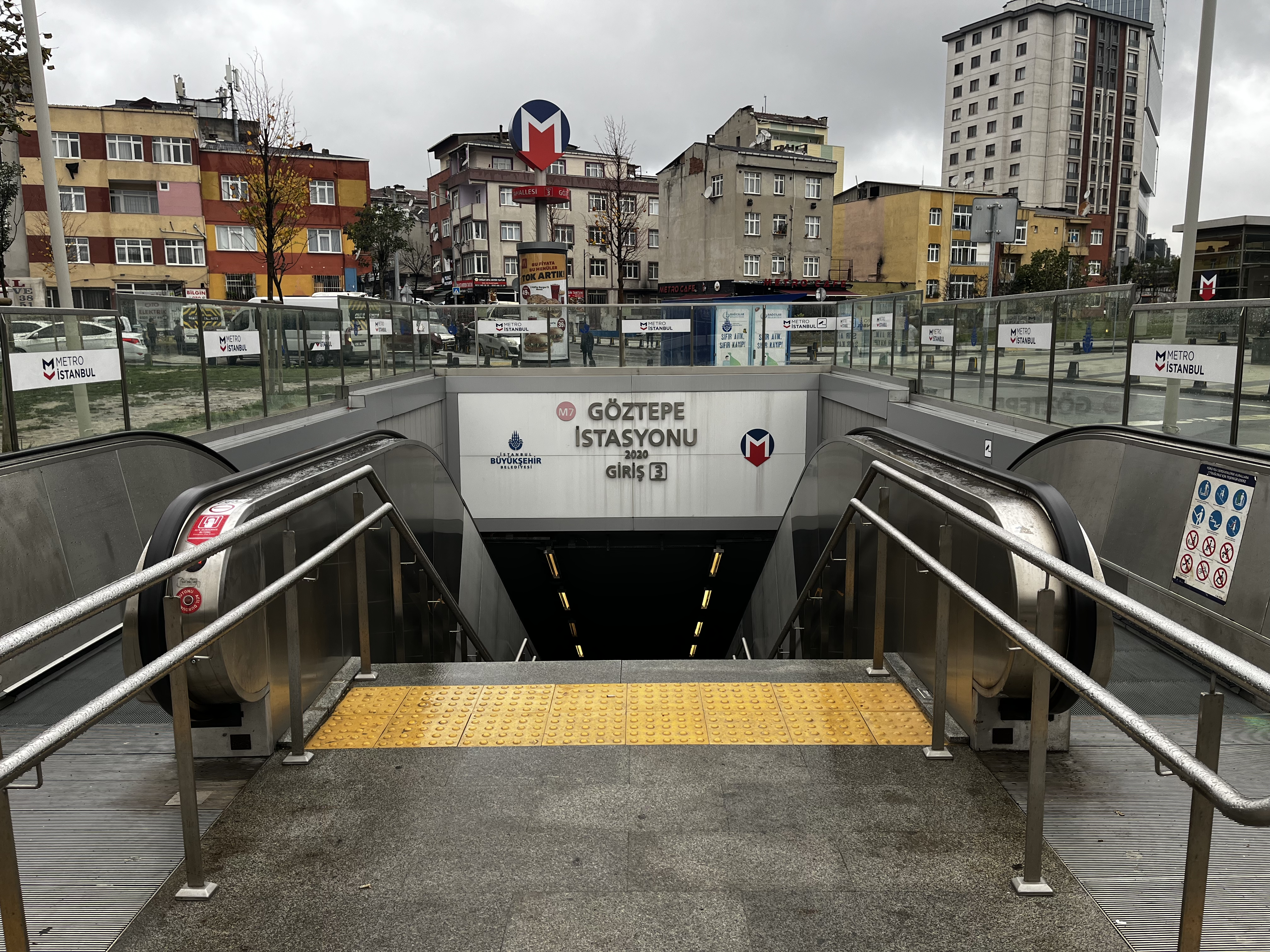
Entrance 1

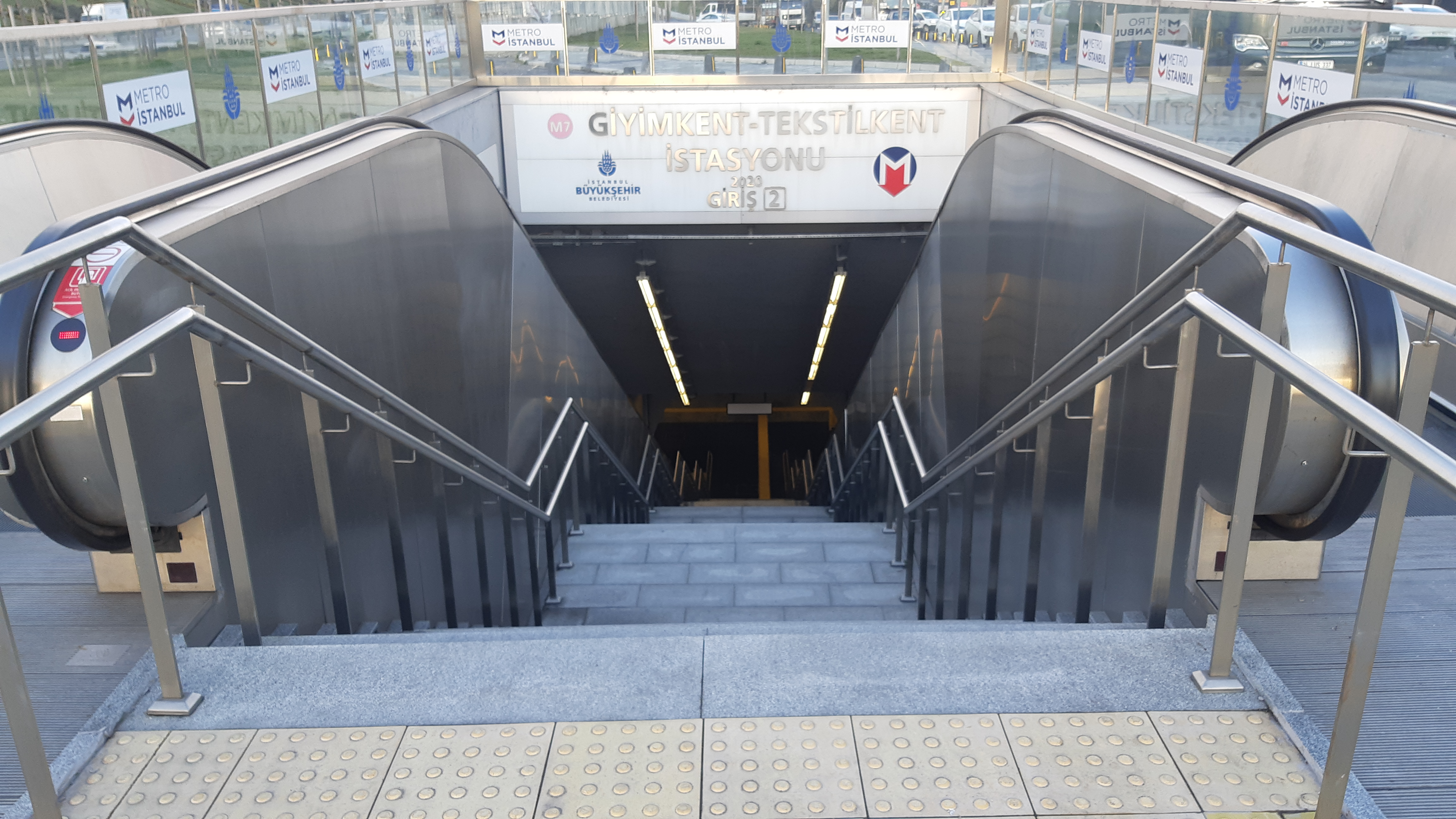
Entrance 2

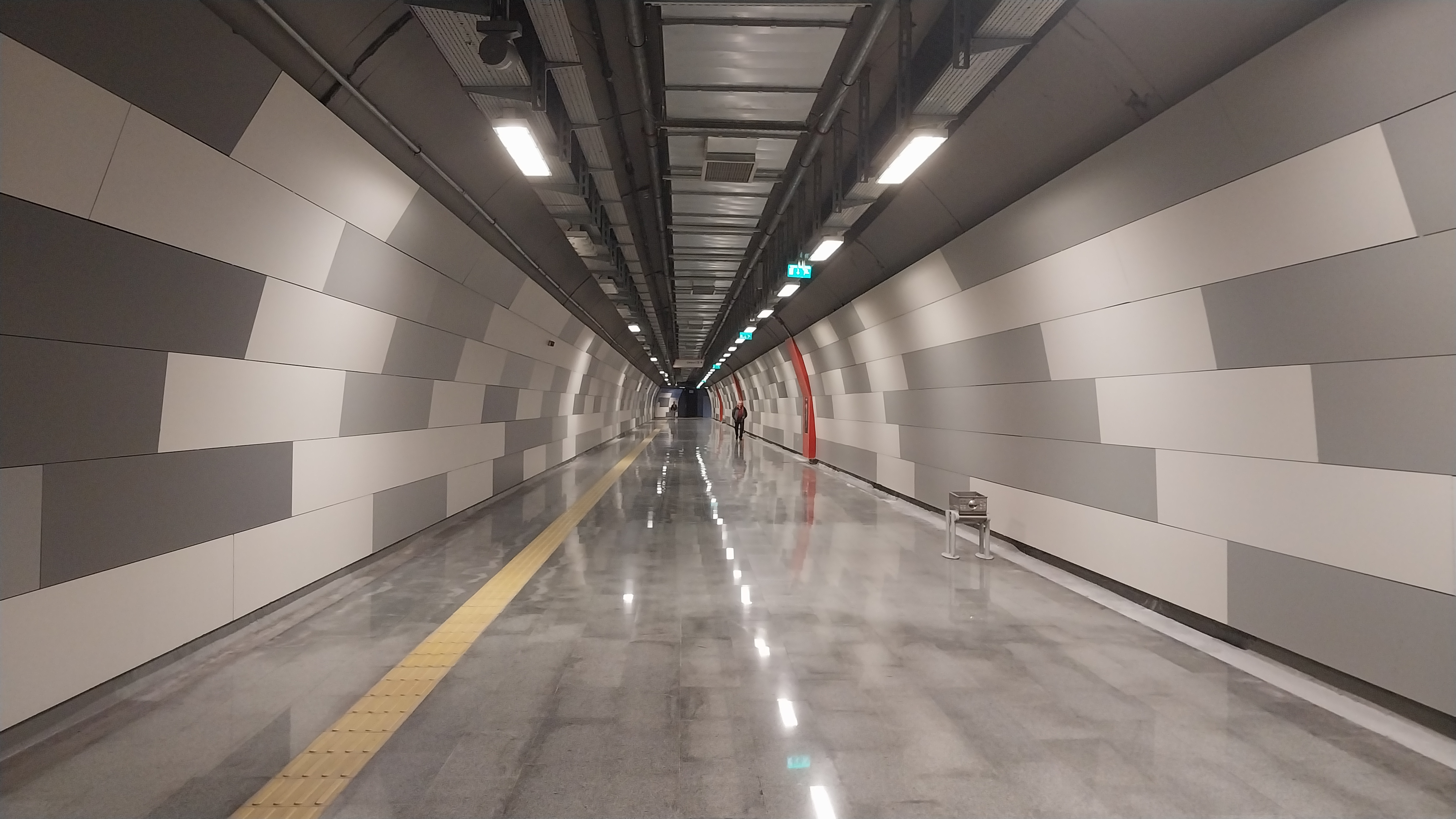
Pedestrian underpass

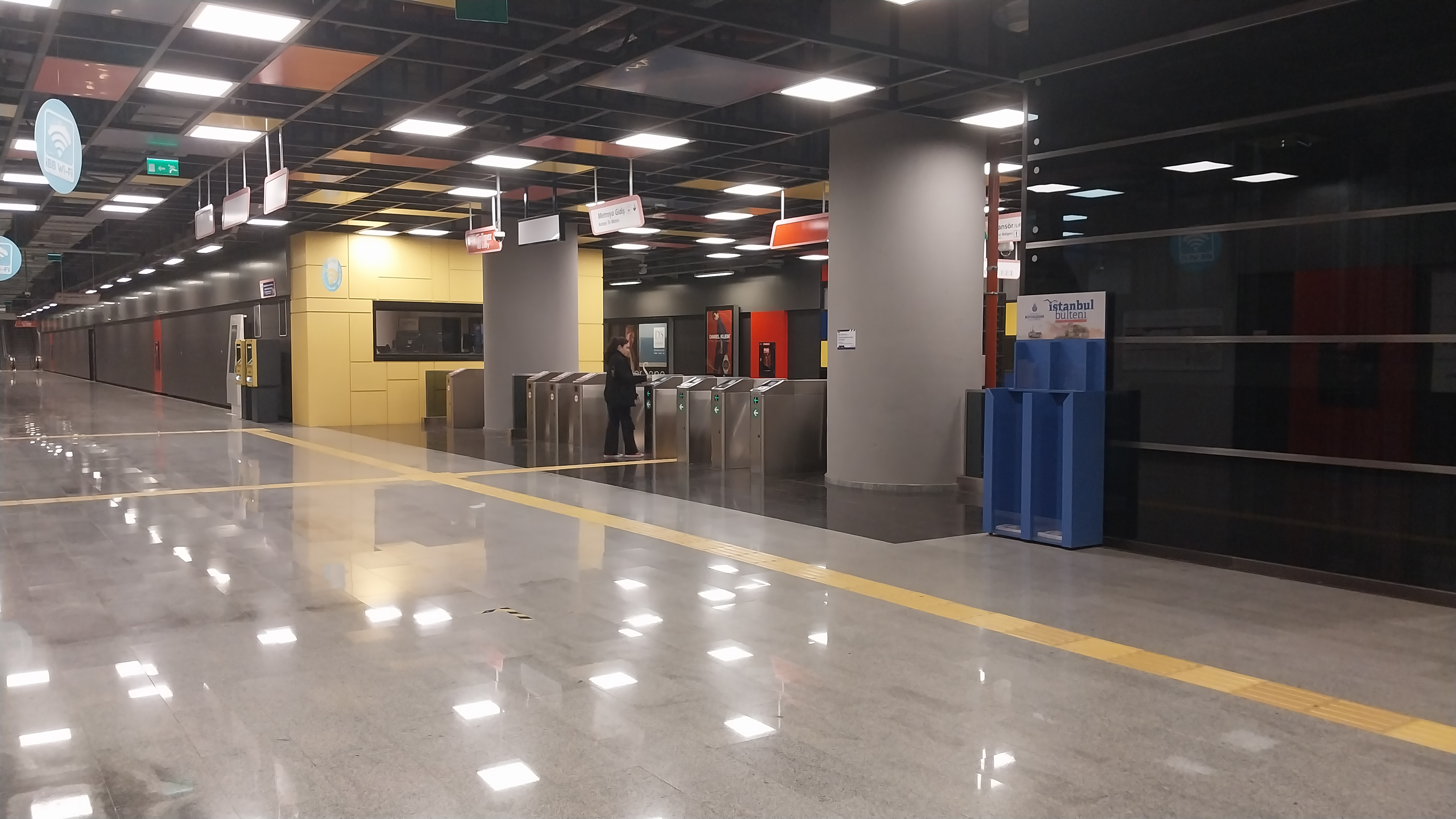
Ticket hall

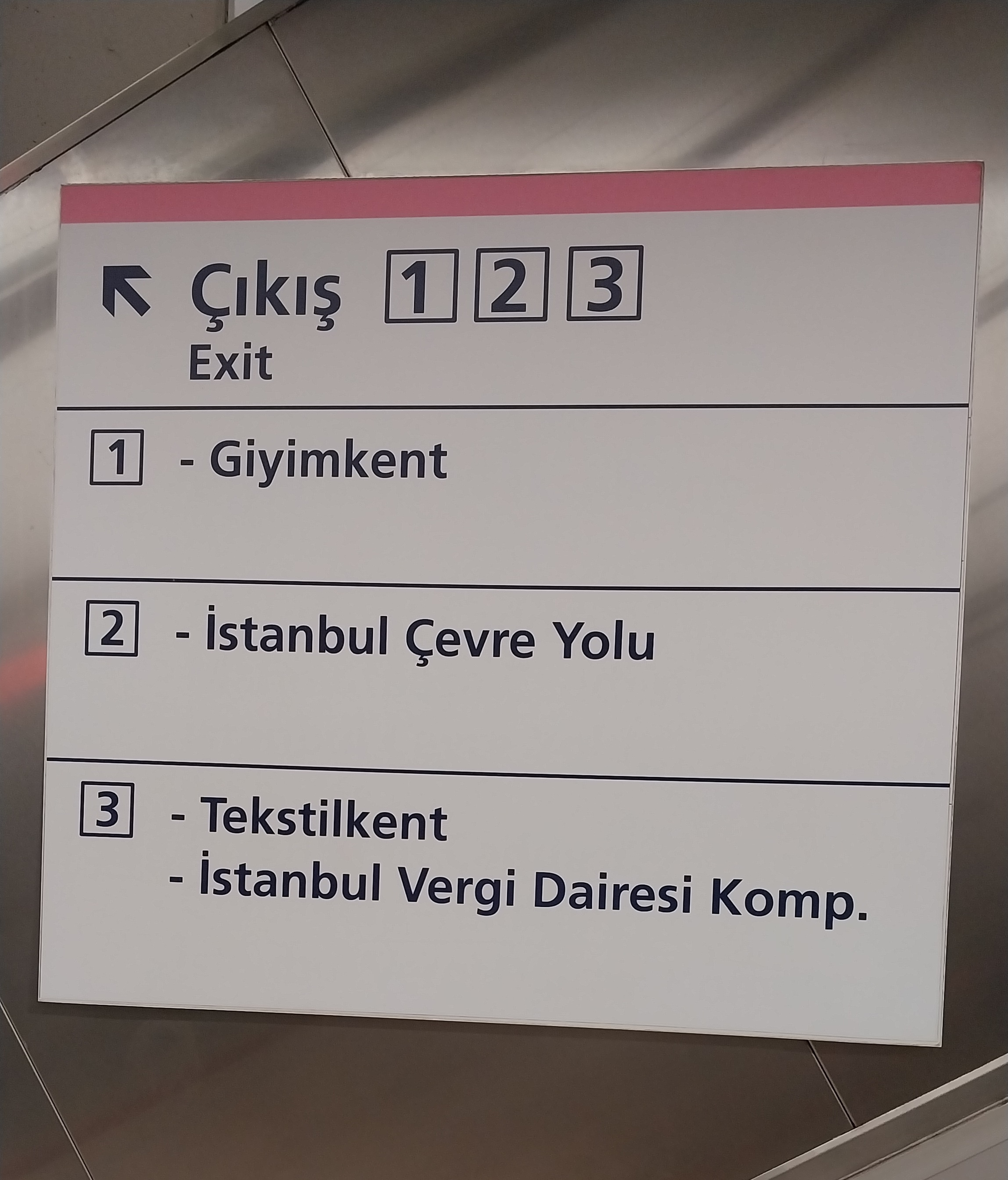
Exit sign

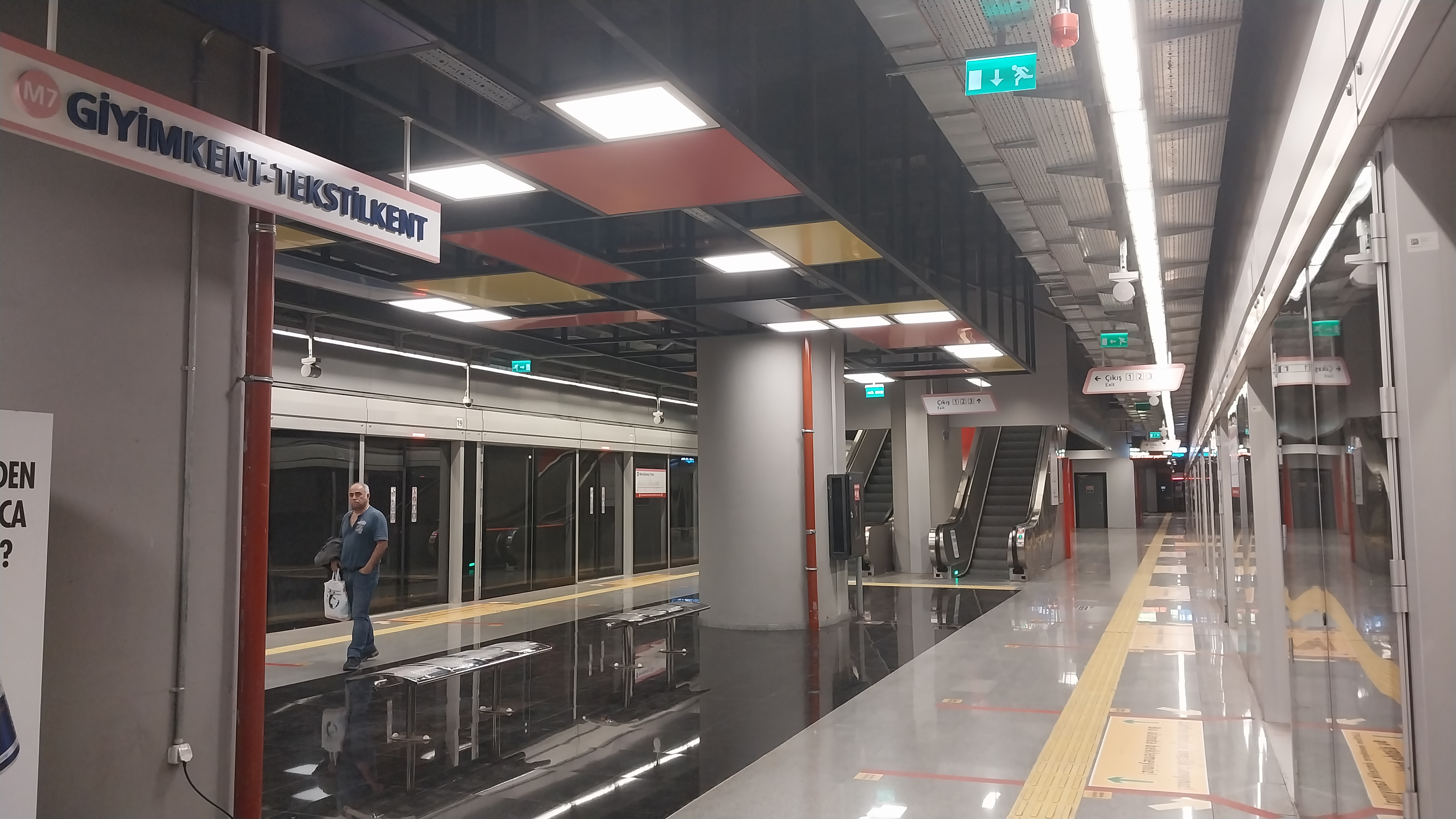
Platform
