= Karadeniz Mahallesi station =

Station of the Istanbul Metro

Karadeniz Mahallesi
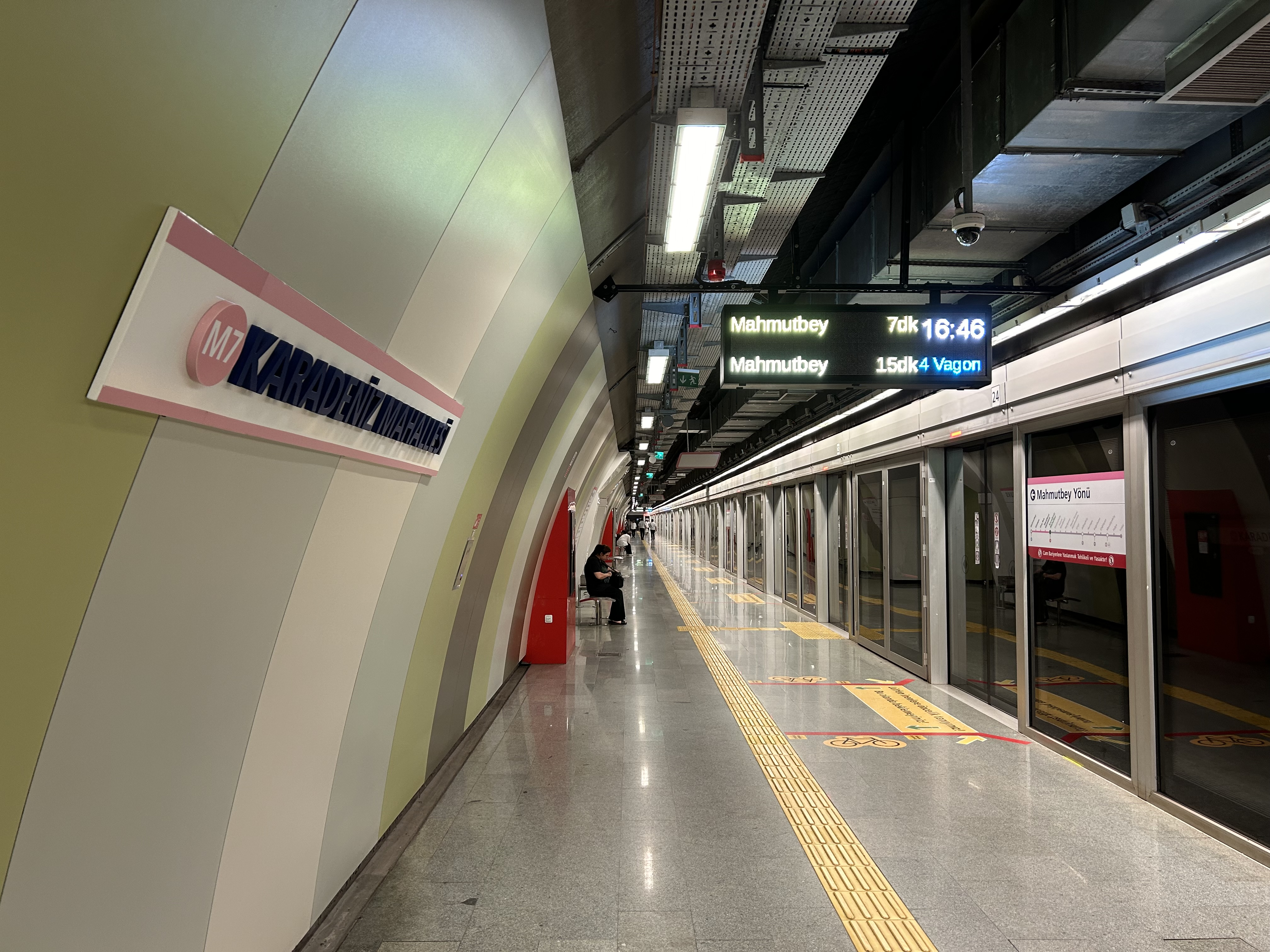
- Platform

General information
- Location: Karadeniz Neighborhood, Old Edirne Asphalt, 34250; Gaziosmanpaşa, Istanbul; Turkey
- Coordinates: 41°4′53″N 28°52′30″E
- System: Istanbul Metro rapid transit station
- Owner: Istanbul Metropolitan Municipality
- Operator: Istanbul Metro
- Line: M7
- Platforms: 1 Island platform
- Tracks: 2
- Connections: Istanbul Tram: T4 at Kiptaş Venezia; İETT Bus: Kiptaş Venezia: 36A, 36CY, 36M, 36V, 336E; Istanbul Minibus: Gaziosmanpaşa - Hadımköy, Gaziosmanpaşa - İmrahor

Construction
- Structure type: Underground
- Parking: No
- Cycle facilities: Yes
- Accessible: Yes

History
- Opened: 28 October 2020 (5 years ago)
- Electrified: 1,500 V DC Overhead line

Services
Preceding station	Istanbul Metro	Following station
Giyimkent–Tekstilkent towards Mahmutbey	M7 Line	Yenimahalle towards Yıldız
Location

Karadeniz Mahallesi is an underground station on the M7 line of the Istanbul Metro. It is located under the Old Edirne Asphalt in the Karadeniz neighborhood of Gaziosmanpaşa. It was opened on 28 October 2020. Connection is available to the T4 line of the Istanbul Tram.

== Station layout ==
Z	Enter/Exit (1) ↓↙	↘↓ Enter/Exit ↘↓ (2–3)	Enter/Exit ↓↙ (4)	Enter/Exit ↓↙ (5)	← Connection (Kiptaş - Venezia)
B1	Enter/Exit (1) ↓↙	Underpass →	Ticket Hall ↙↓↓	← Underpass
B2	Ticket Hall ↓↓↘	← Underpass ↗↑	↙ Passageway
B3	Passageway ↙		↙ Passageway
B4	Passageway ↙↘		↘ Passageway
B5	Platform

Platform level	Westbound	← toward Mahmutbey (Giyimkent-Tekstilkent)
Platform level	Island platform, doors will open on the left
Platform level	Eastbound	toward Mecidiyeköy (Yenimahalle) →

== Operation information ==
The M7 line operates between 06:00 and 00:00 with a train frequency of 6 minutes at peak hours and 7.5 minutes at all other times. The line also operates night metro services between 00:00 and 06:00 on Saturdays and Sundays, with trains running every 30 minutes. This provides 66 hours of uninterrupted service between Friday and Sunday. During these hours, fares are charged at double the price. During this time, Entrances 1, 3 and 4 are open, whilst Entrances 2 and 5 are closed.

== Gallery ==
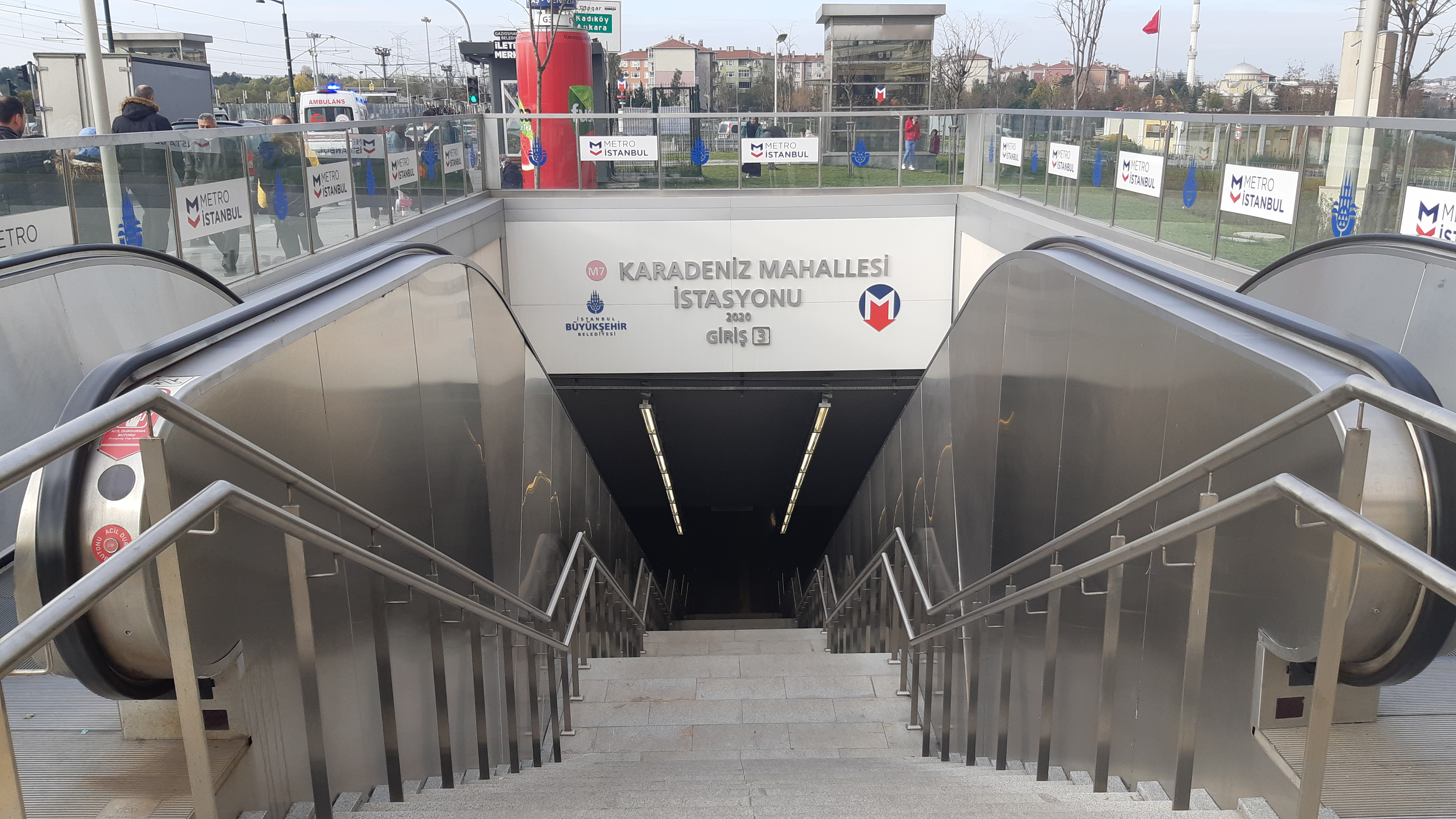
Entrance 3

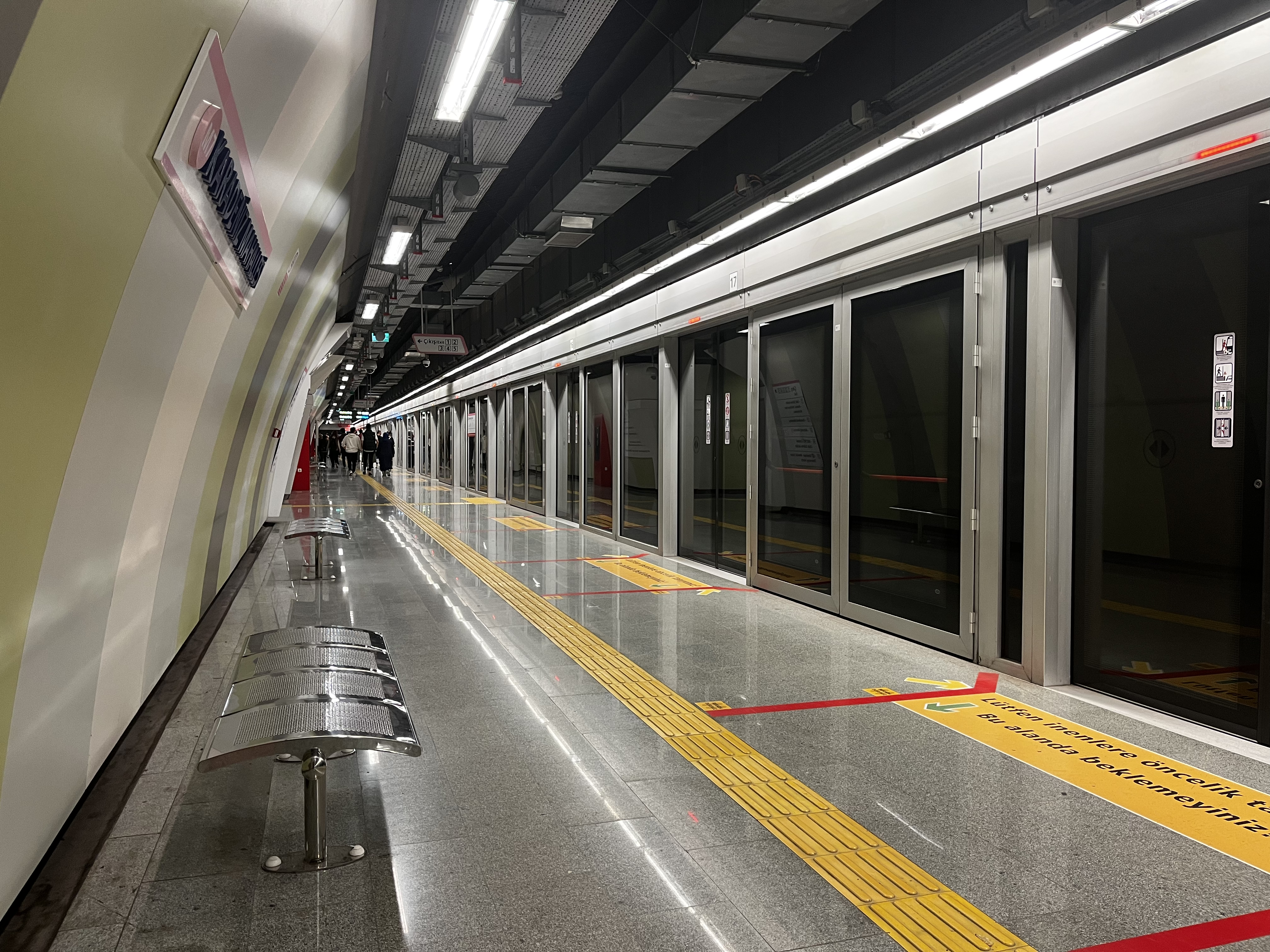
Platform view

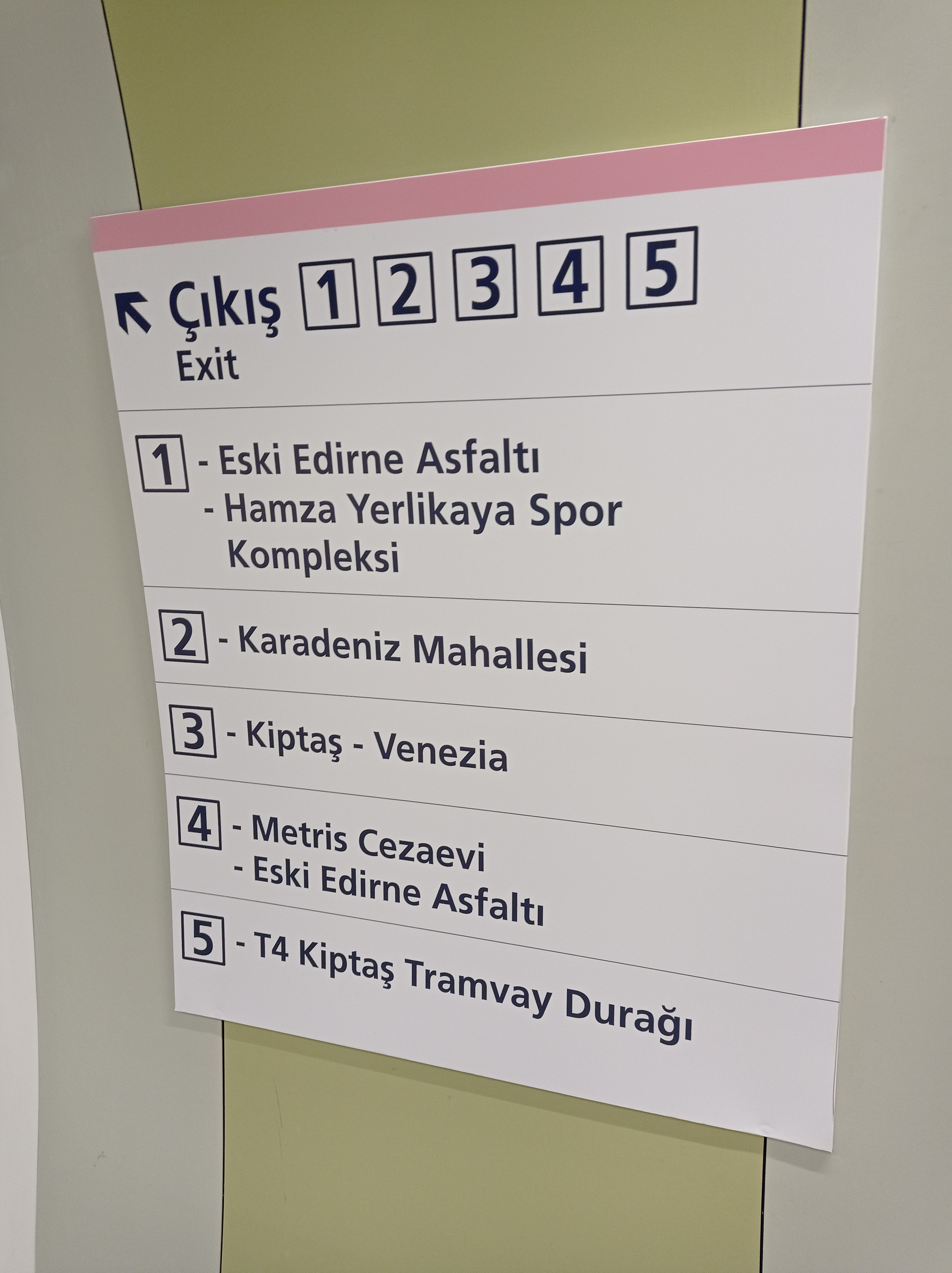
Exit sign

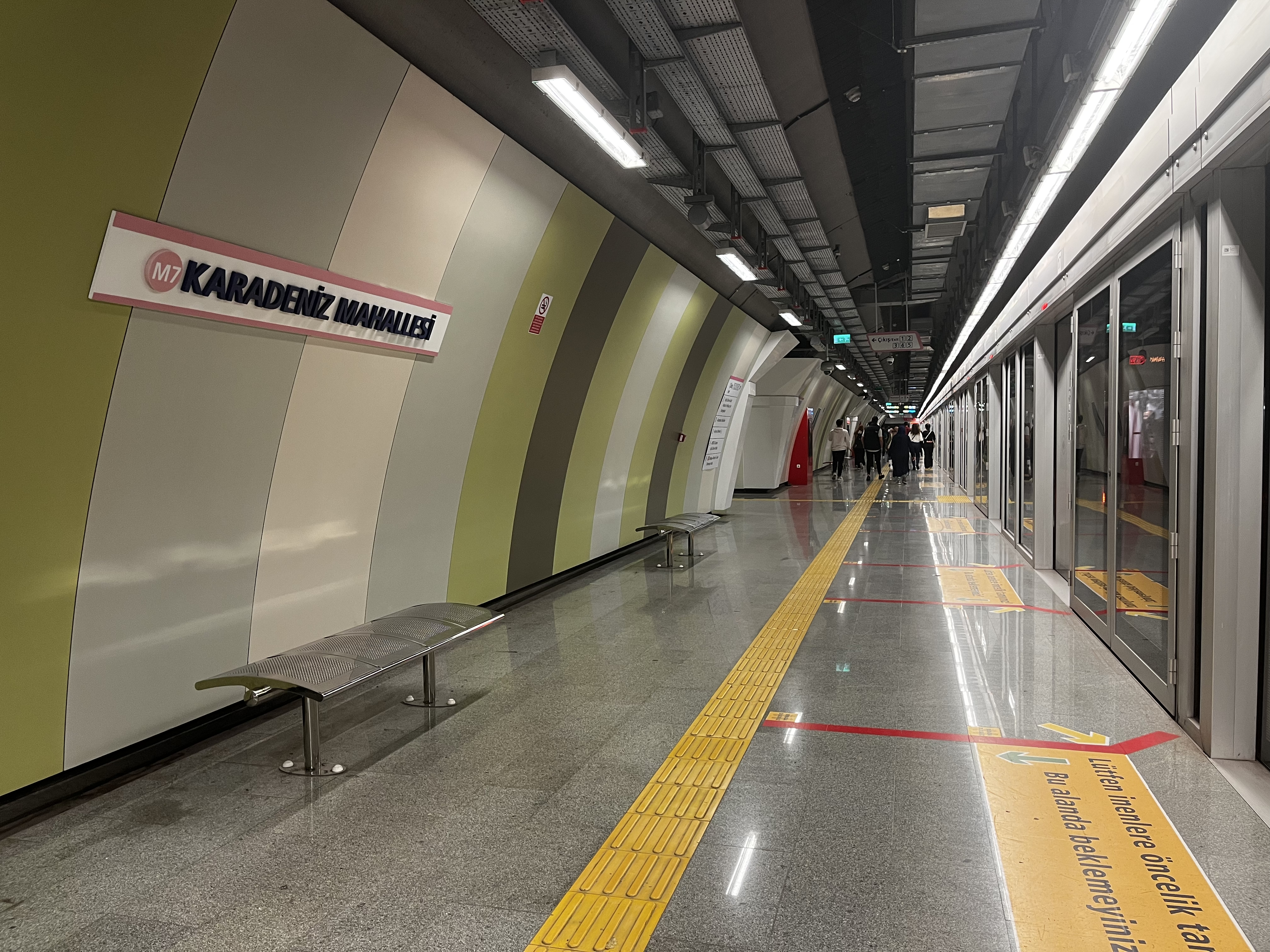
Platform
