= Göztepe Mahallesi station =

Station of the Istanbul Metro

Göztepe Mahallesi
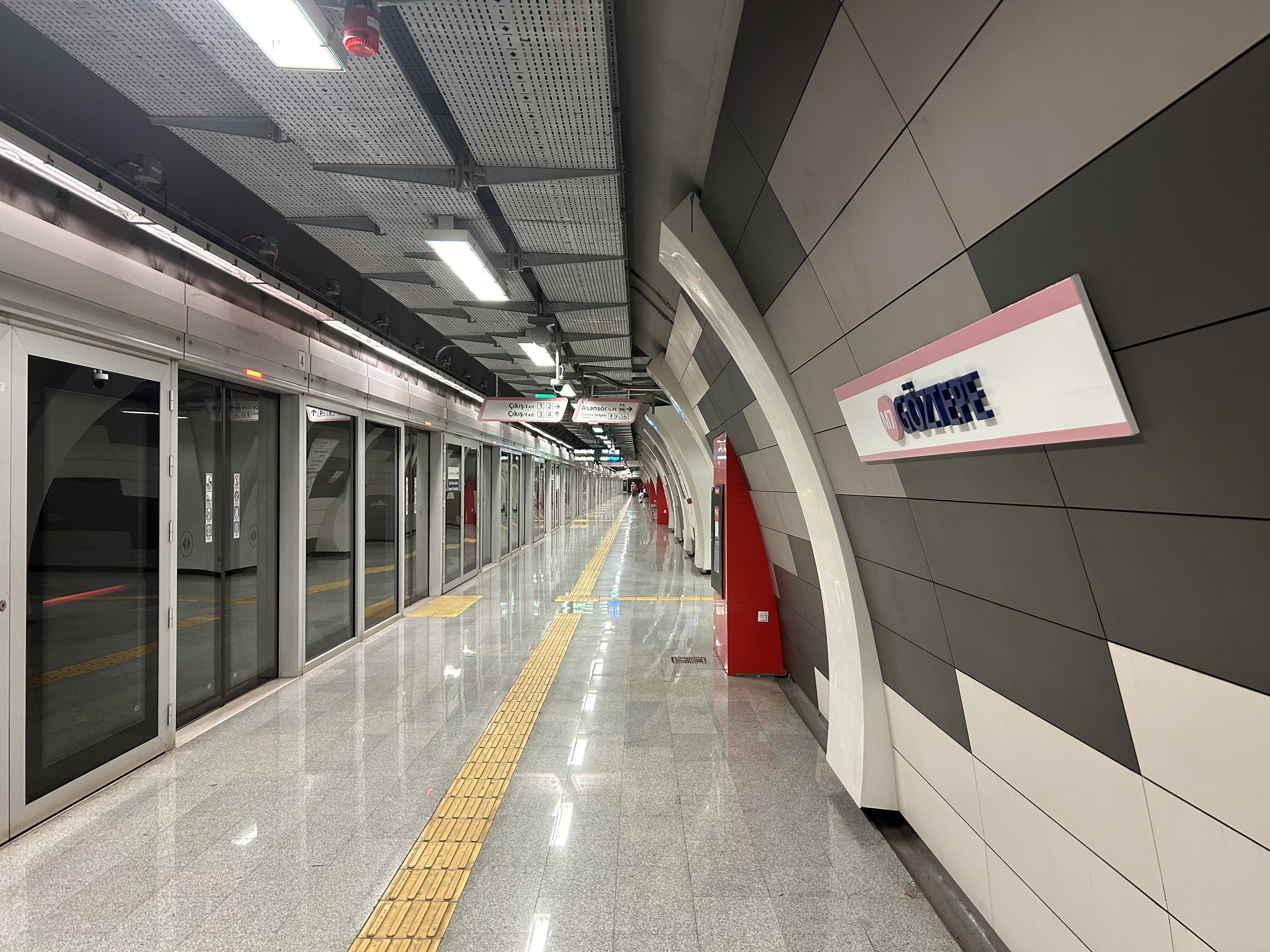
- Platform

General information
- Location: Göztepe Neighborhood, O-3 Southern Byway, 34214; Bağcılar, Istanbul; Turkey
- Coordinates: 41°3′24″N 28°50′50″E
- System: Istanbul Metro rapid transit station
- Owner: Istanbul Metropolitan Municipality
- Operator: Istanbul Metro
- Line: M7
- Platforms: 1 Island platform
- Tracks: 2
- Connections: İETT Bus: Matbaacılar Sitesi: 31Y, 76A, 76O, 78, 78FB, 78H, 89C, 89T, 91E, 97GE, 97M, 141A, 141M, 146A, 146B, 146K, 146M, 146T, 303B, HT11, MK92; Istanbul Minibus: Güzeltepe - İstoç, Şirinevler - Giyimkent

Construction
- Structure type: Underground
- Parking: No
- Cycle facilities: Yes
- Accessible: Yes

History
- Opened: 28 October 2020 (5 years ago)
- Electrified: 1,500 V DC Overhead line

Services
Preceding station	Istanbul Metro	Following station
Mahmutbey Terminus	M7 Line	Oruç Reis towards Yıldız
Location

Göztepe Mahallesi (Göztepe) is an underground station on the M7 line of the Istanbul Metro. It is located under the O-3 Southern Byway in the Göztepe neighborhood of Bağcılar. It was opened on 28 October 2020.

== Station layout ==
Z	Enter/Exit ↓ (1–2)	Enter/Exit ↓ (3–4)
B1	↓↘ Ticket Hall	↙↓ Ticket Hall
B2	Platform	Platform

Platform level	Westbound	← toward Mahmutbey (terminus)
Platform level	Island platform, doors will open on the left
Platform level	Eastbound	toward Mecidiyeköy (Oruç Reis) →

== Operation information ==
The M7 line operates between 06:00 and 00:00 with a train frequency of 6 minutes at peak hours and 7.5 minutes at all other times. The line also operates night metro services between 00:00 and 06:00 on Saturdays and Sundays, with trains running every 30 minutes. This provides 66 hours of uninterrupted service between Friday and Sunday. During these hours, fares are charged at double the price. During this time, Entrances 1 and 3 are open, whilst Entrances 2 and 4 are closed.

== Gallery ==
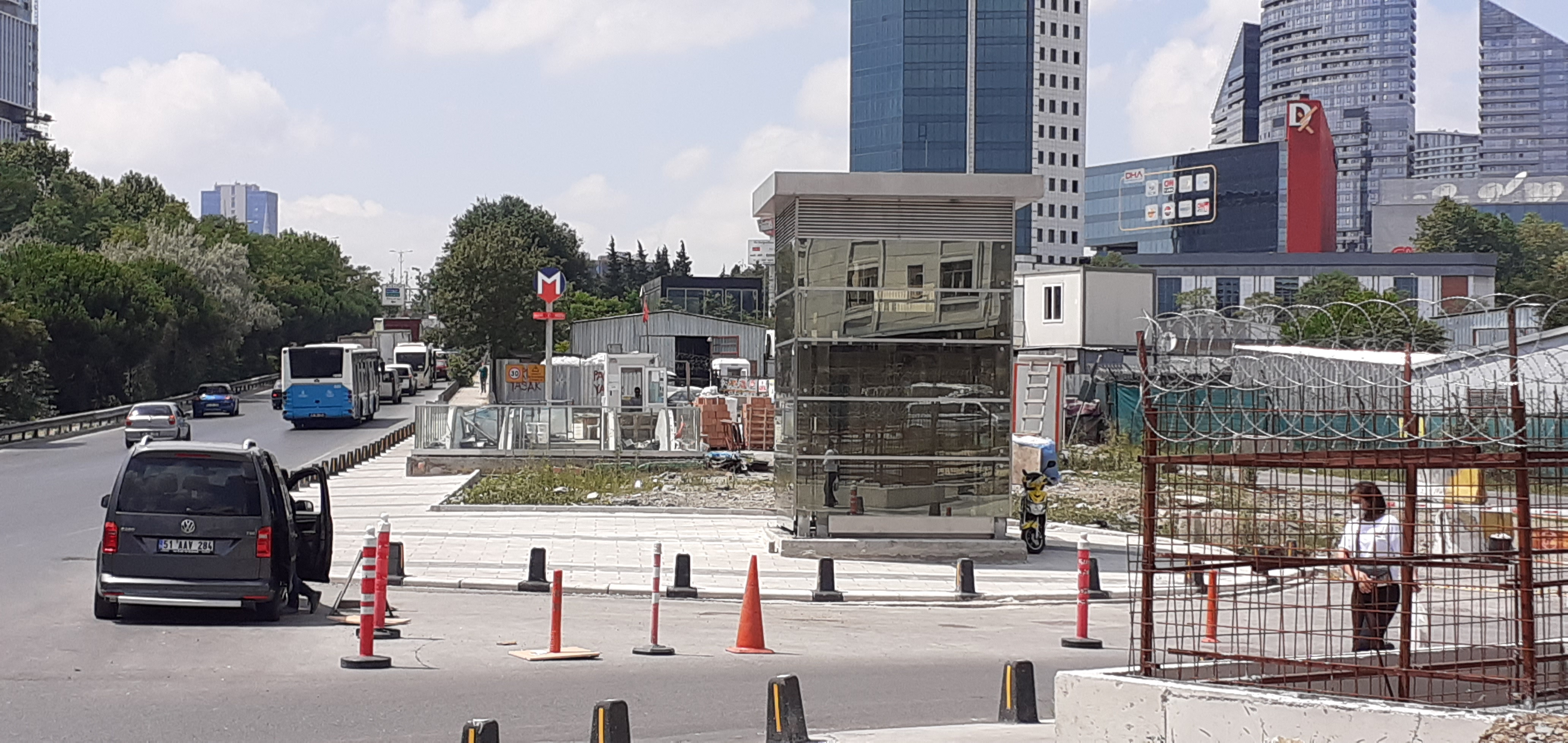
Under construction (September 2020)

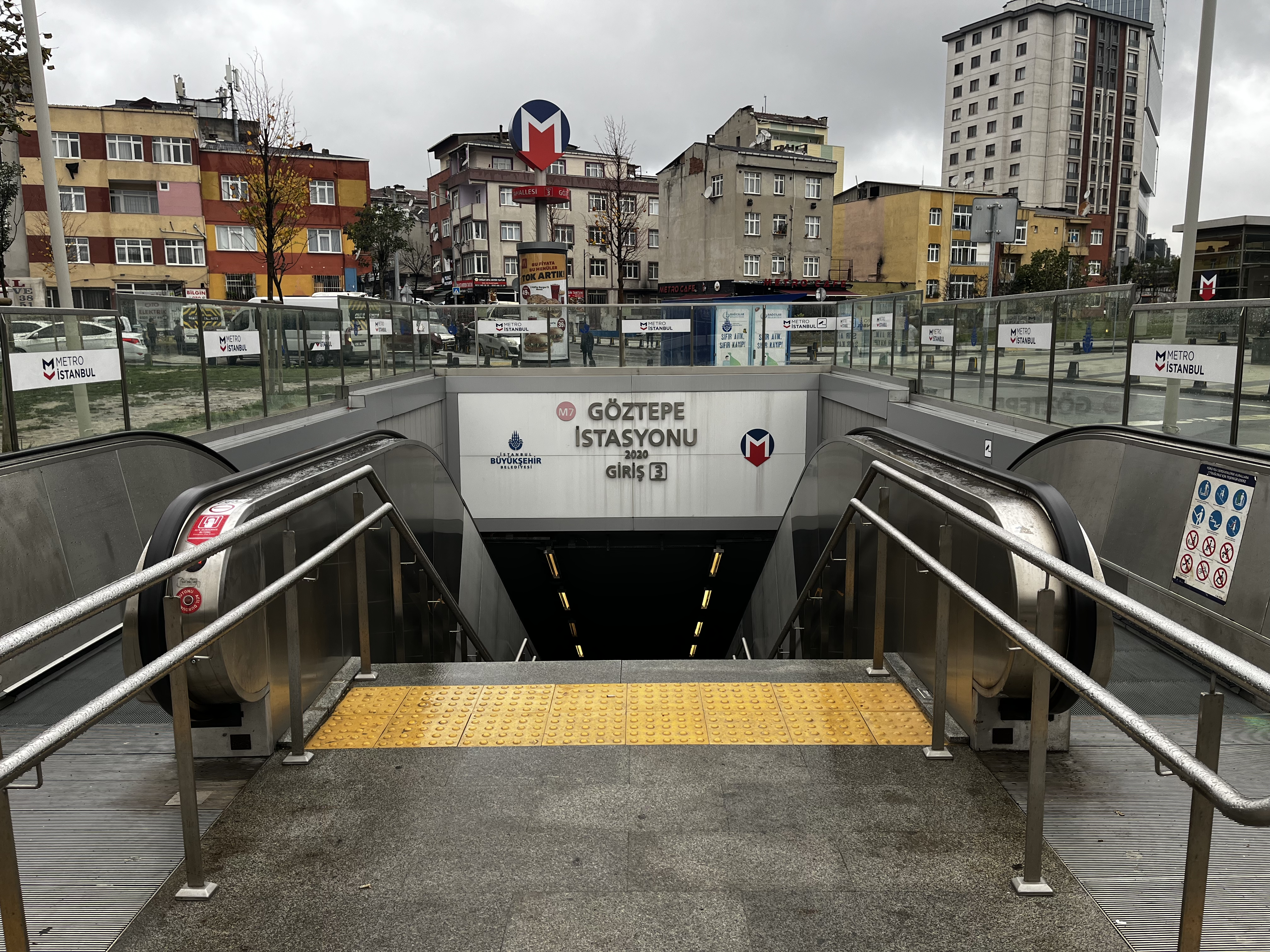
Entrance 3

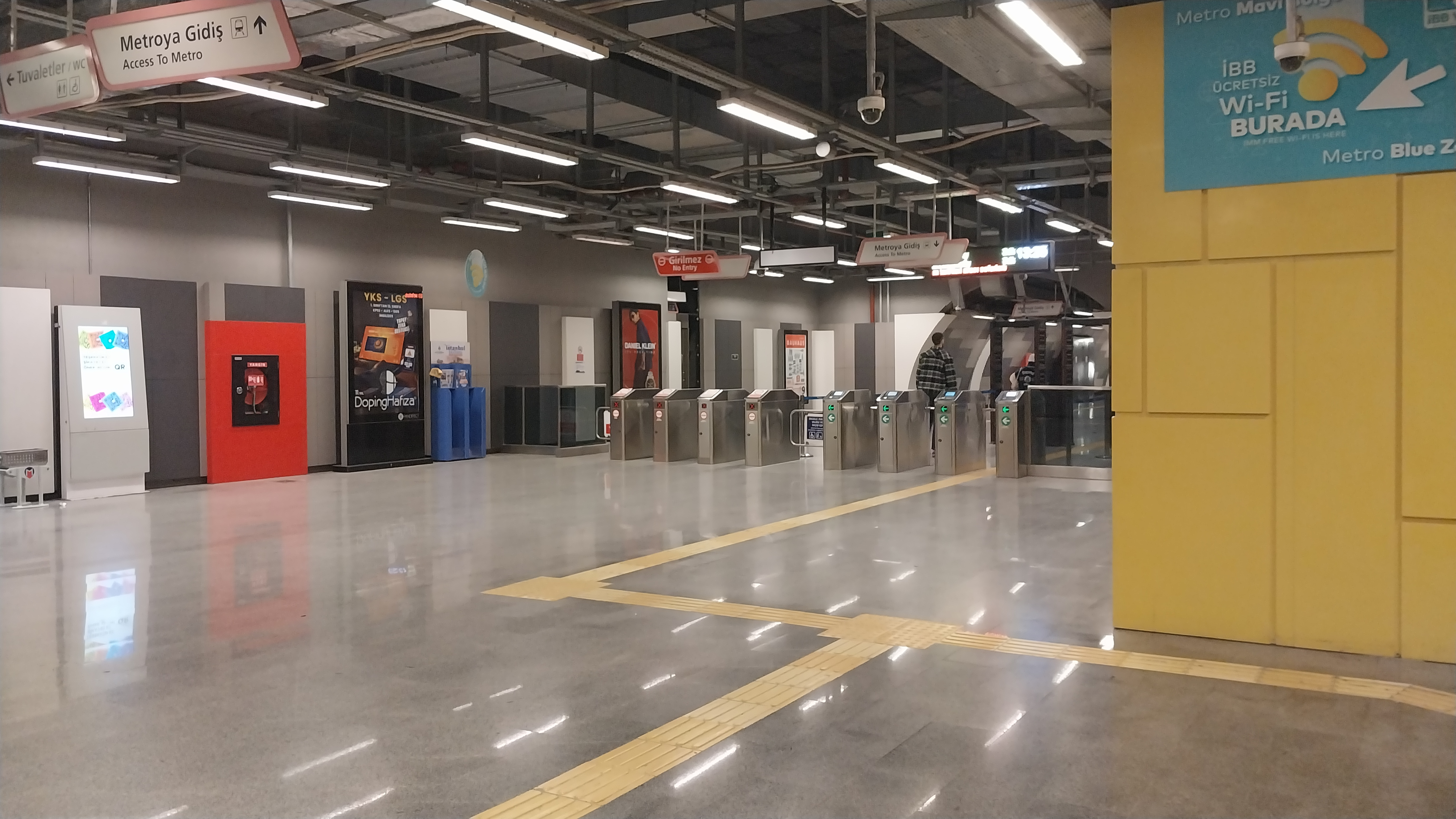
Ticket hall

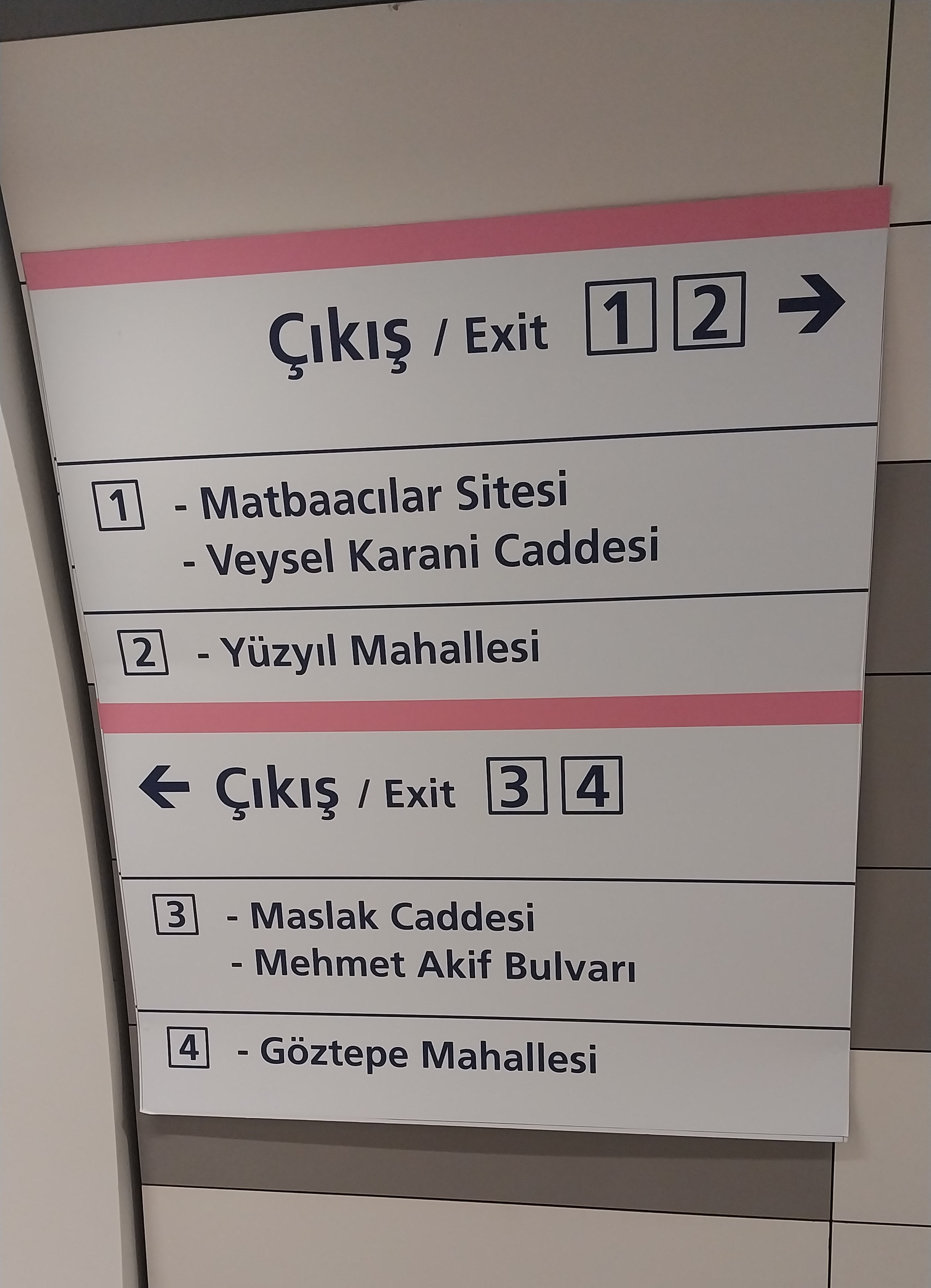
Exit sign

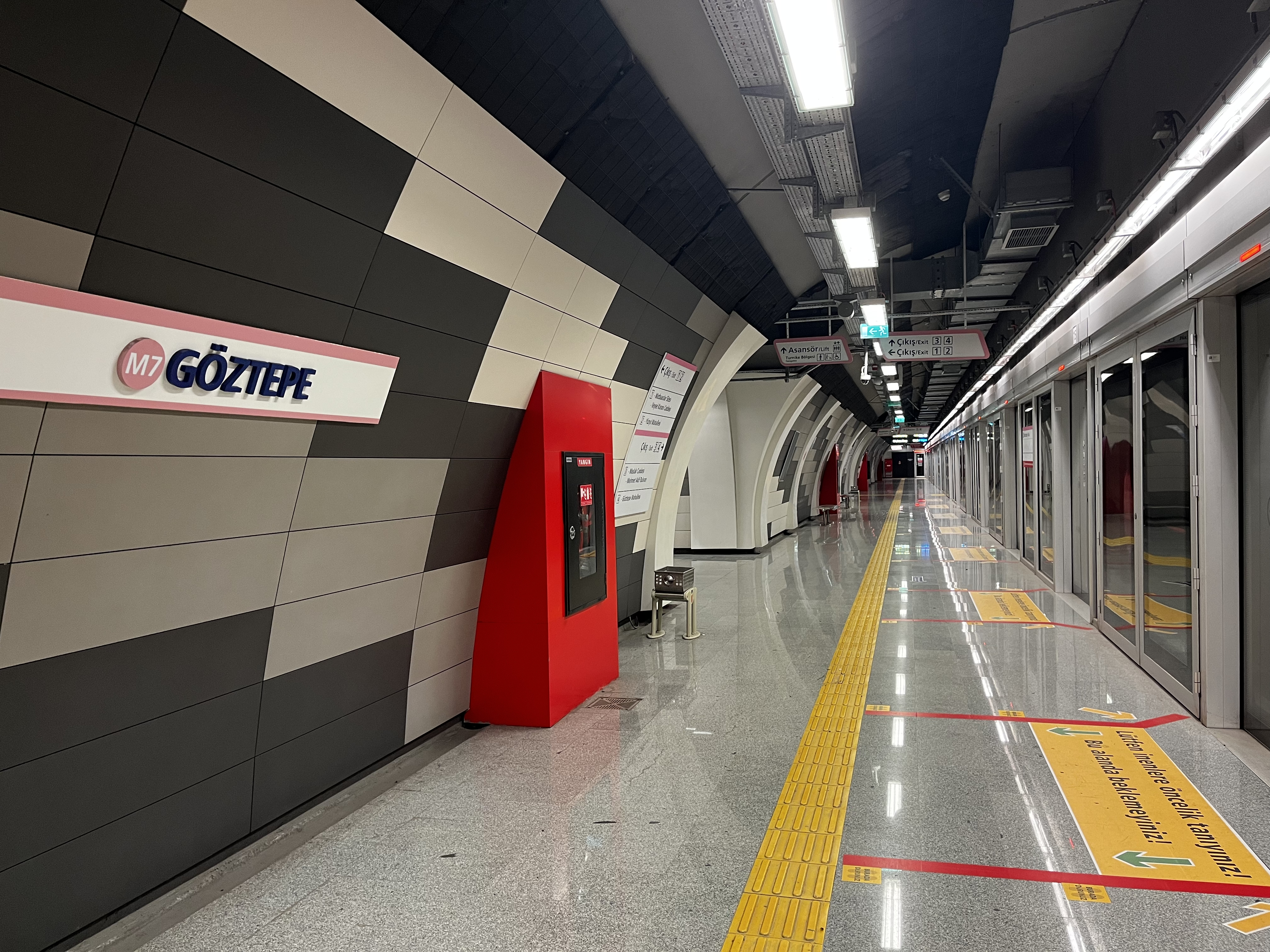
Platform
