= Mahmutbey station =

Station of the Istanbul Metro

Mahmutbey (M3) Mahmutbey (M7)
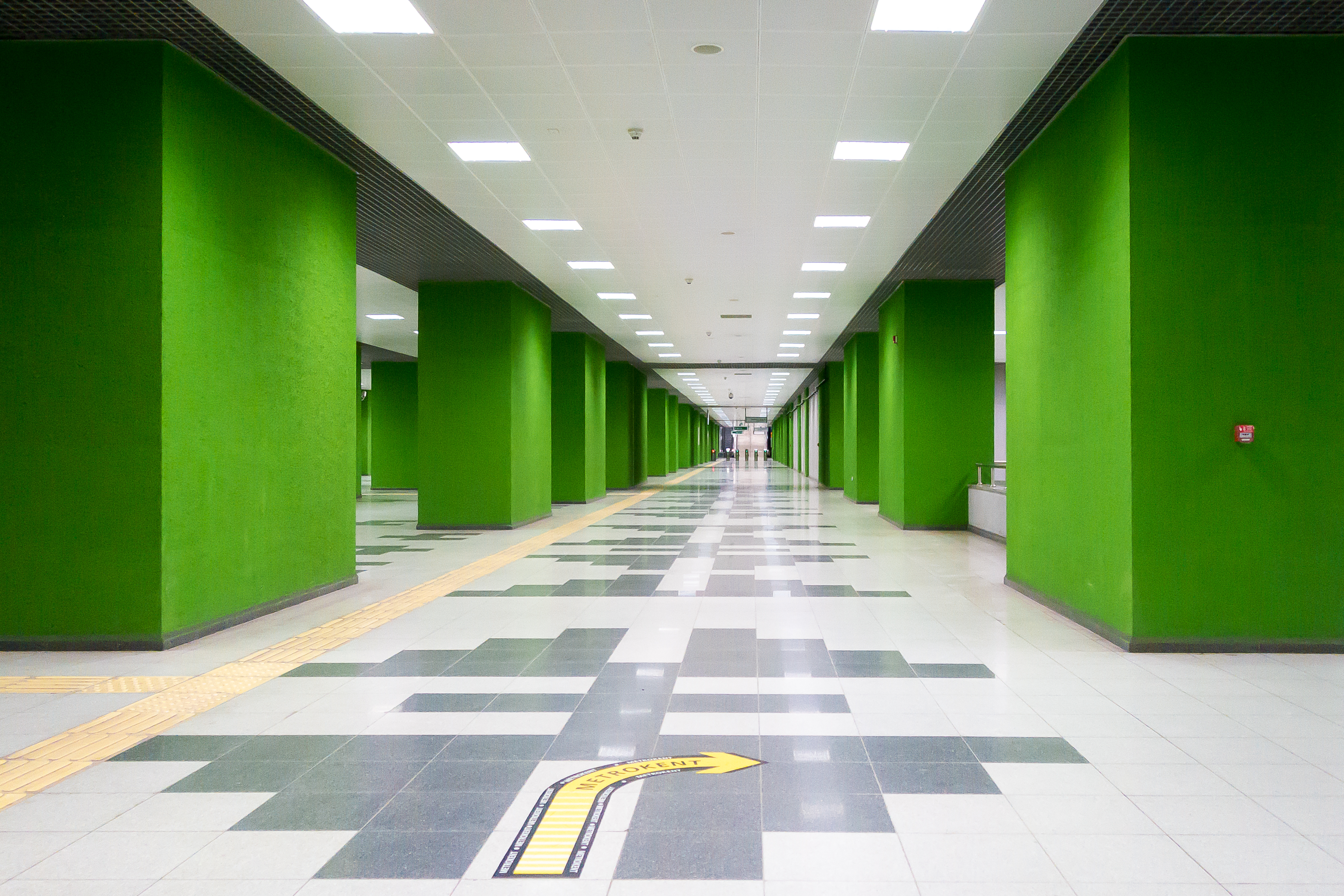
- Ticket hall

General information
- Location: Göztepe Neighborhood, Bosna Street, 34214; Bağcılar, Istanbul; Turkey
- Coordinates: 41°3′19″N 28°49′50″E
- System: Istanbul Metro rapid transit station
- Owner: Istanbul Metropolitan Municipality
- Operator: Metro Istanbul A.Ş.
- Lines: M3; M7
- Platforms: M3: 2 Side platforms M7: 1 island platform
- Tracks: M3: 3 M7: 2
- Connections: İETT Bus: 89C, 89T, 97E, 97GE, 97H, 97M, 98M, 144M, HT10; Istanbul Minibus: Bakırköy-Fatih Mah., Bakırköy-İkitelli, Güneşli-Sultançiftliği, Topkapı-Bağcılar-İstoç, Topkapı-Otogar-İstoç, İkitelli O.S.-Otogar, İkitelli O.S.-Topkapı, İstoç-Bağcılar D. Hast., Şirinevler-İstoç

Construction
- Structure type: Underground
- Parking: No
- Cycle facilities: Yes
- Accessible: Yes

History
- Opened: M3: 13 June 2013 (13 years ago); M7: 28 October 2020 (5 years ago)
- Electrified: 1,500 V DC Overhead line

Services
Preceding station	Istanbul Metro	Following station
İSTOÇ towards Kayaşehir Merkez	M3 Line	Yenimahalle towards Bakırköy Sahil
Terminus	M7 Line	Göztepe Mahallesi towards Yıldız
Location

Mahmutbey is an underground station on the M3 and M7 lines of the Istanbul Metro in Bağcılar, Istanbul. The station is located beneath Bosna Street in the Göztepe neighborhood of Bağcılar. Mahmutbey was opened on 14 June 2013 along with the Kirazlı-MetroKent portion of the M3.

The station became the western terminus of the M7 line to Mecidiyeköy in 2020, when the M7 began operation. The platforms for M7 are underneath the M3 line.

== M3 platform ==
Side platform, doors will open on the right
Northbound	← toward Kayaşehir Merkez (İSTOÇ)
Middle Track	← siding →
Southbound	toward Bakırköy Sahil (Yenimahalle) →
Side platform, doors will open on the right

== M7 platform ==
Eastbound	toward Mecidiyeköy (Göztepe Mahallesi) →
Island platform, doors will open on the left
	No passenger service

== Operation information ==
=== M3 ===
The M3 line operates between 06:00 and 00:00 and train frequency is 7 minutes at peak hours and 10 minutes at all other times. The line has no night service.

=== M7 ===
The M7 line operates between 06:00 and 00:00 and train frequency is 6 minutes at peak hours and 7.5 minutes at all other times. The line also operates night metro services between 00:00 and 06:00 on Saturdays and Sundays, with trains running every 30 minutes. This provides 66 hours of uninterrupted service between Friday and Sunday. During these hours, fares are charged at double the price.

== Gallery ==
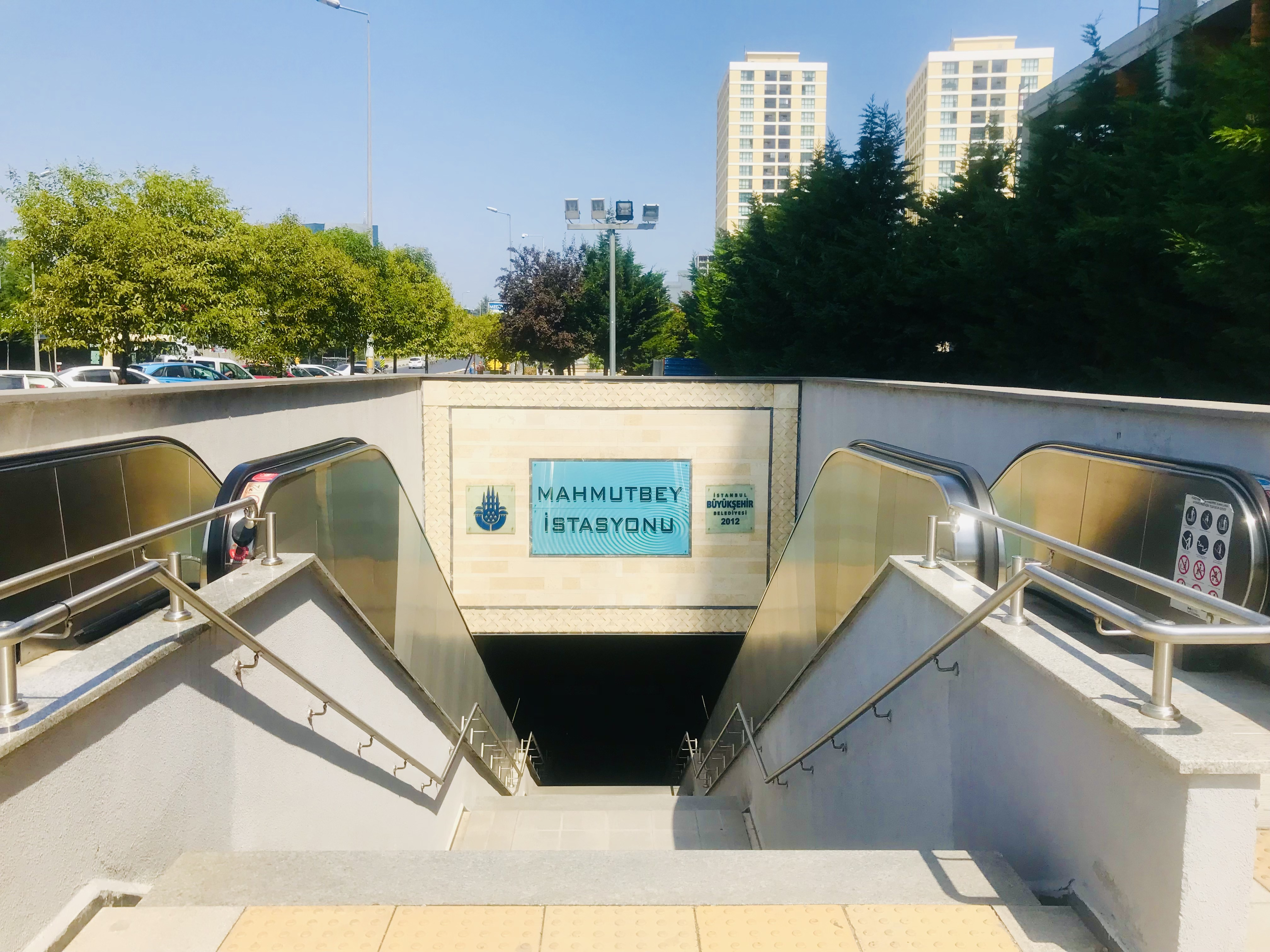
M3 entrance

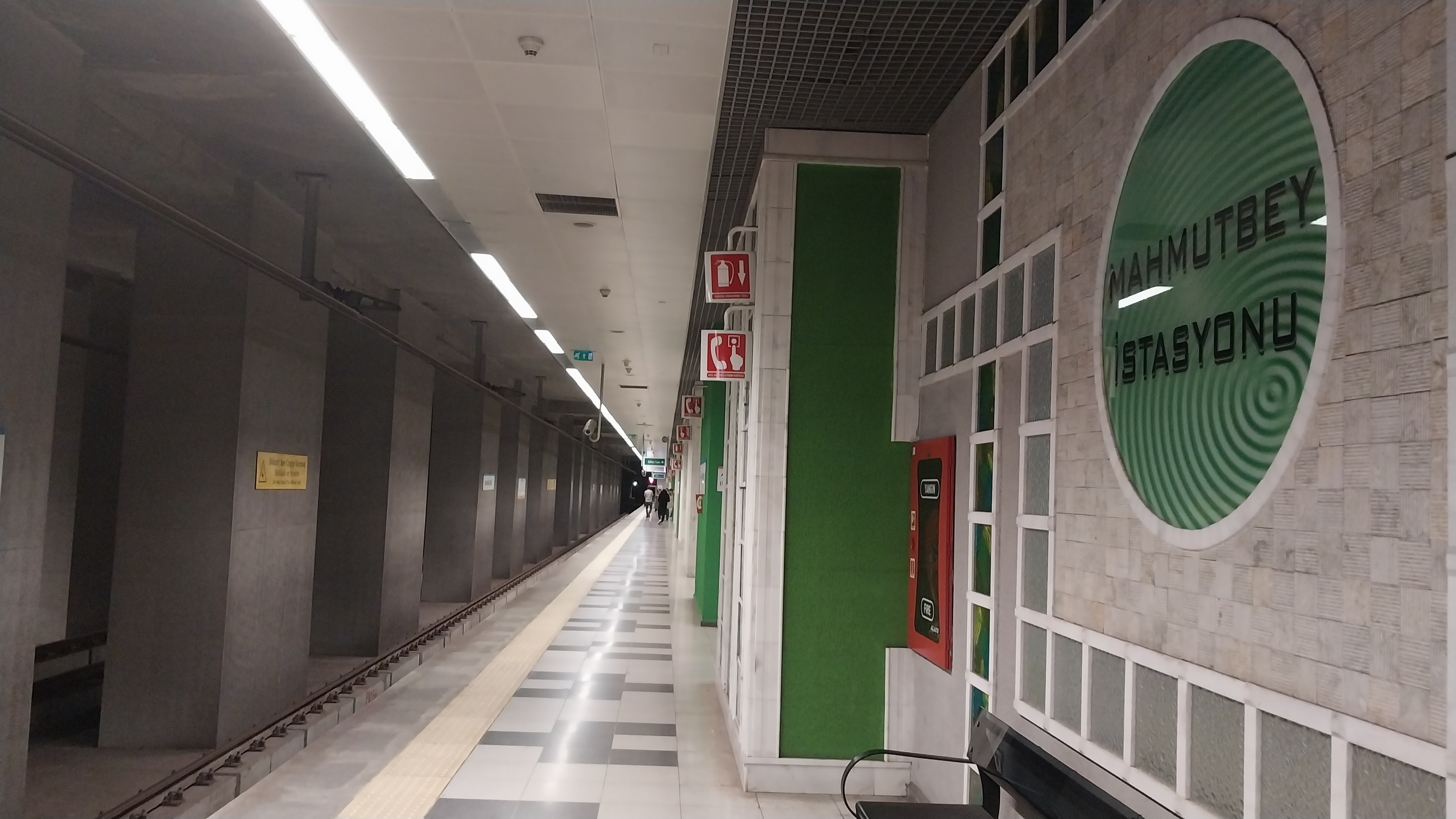
M3 platform

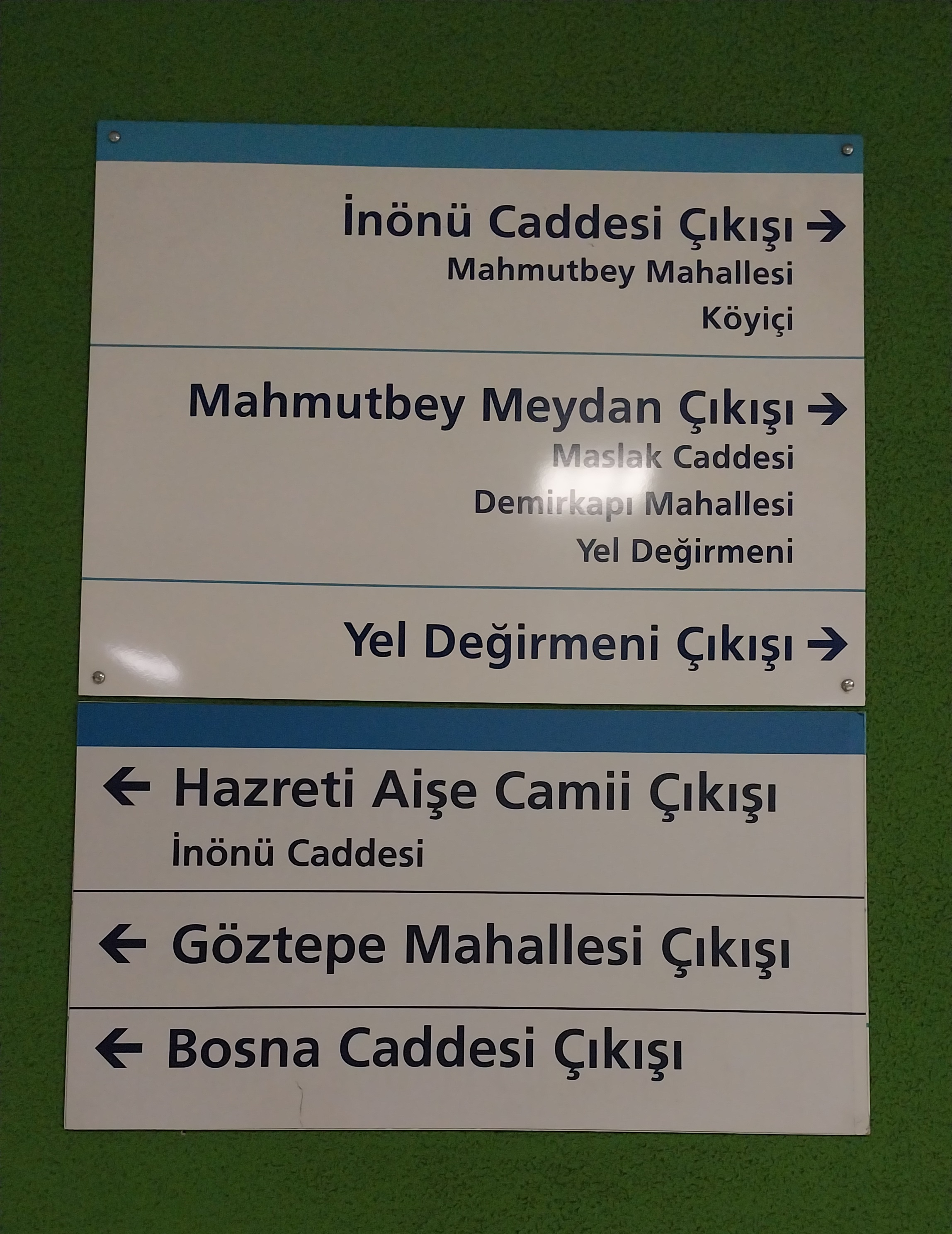
M3 exit sign

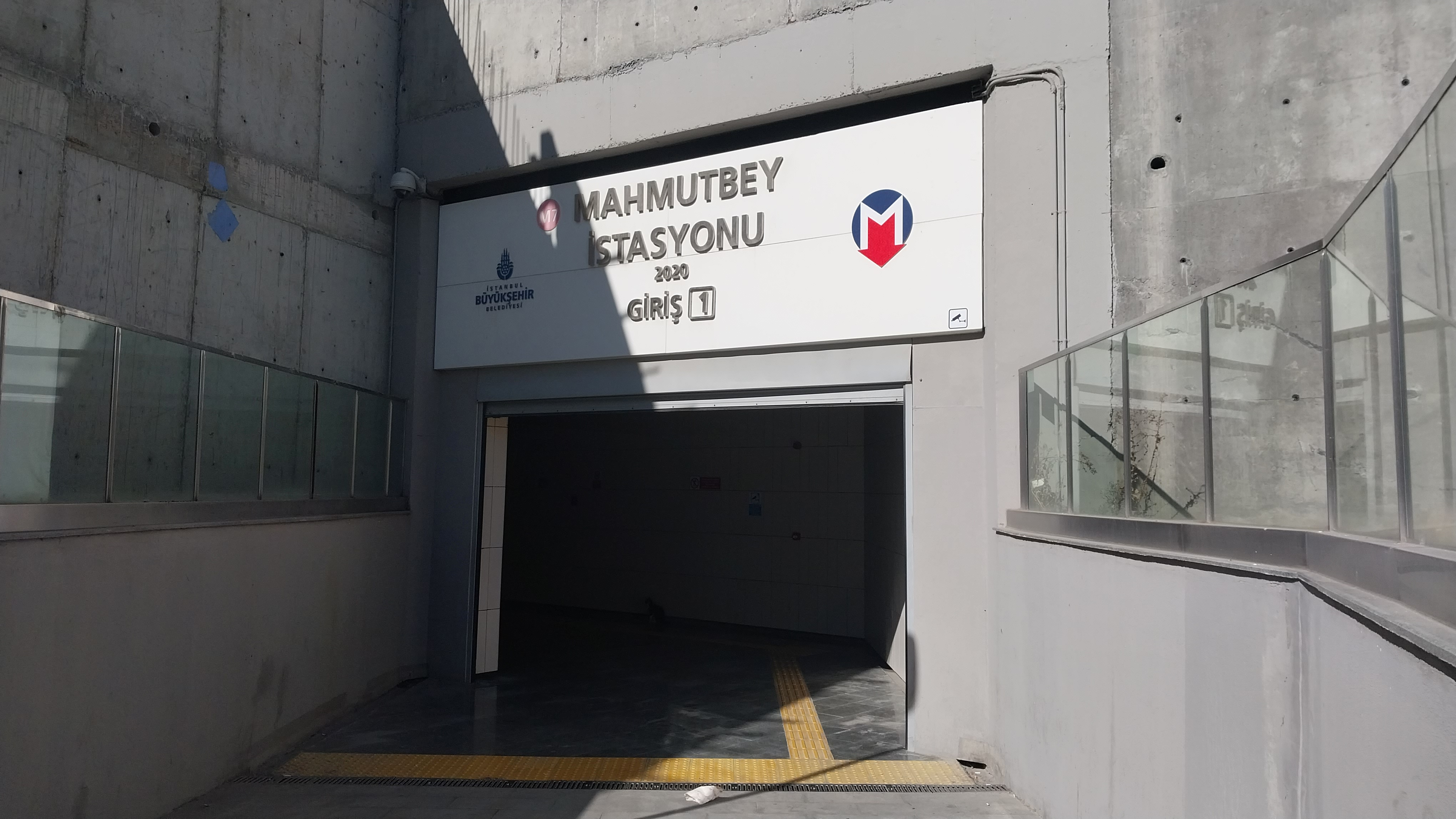
M7 entrance 1

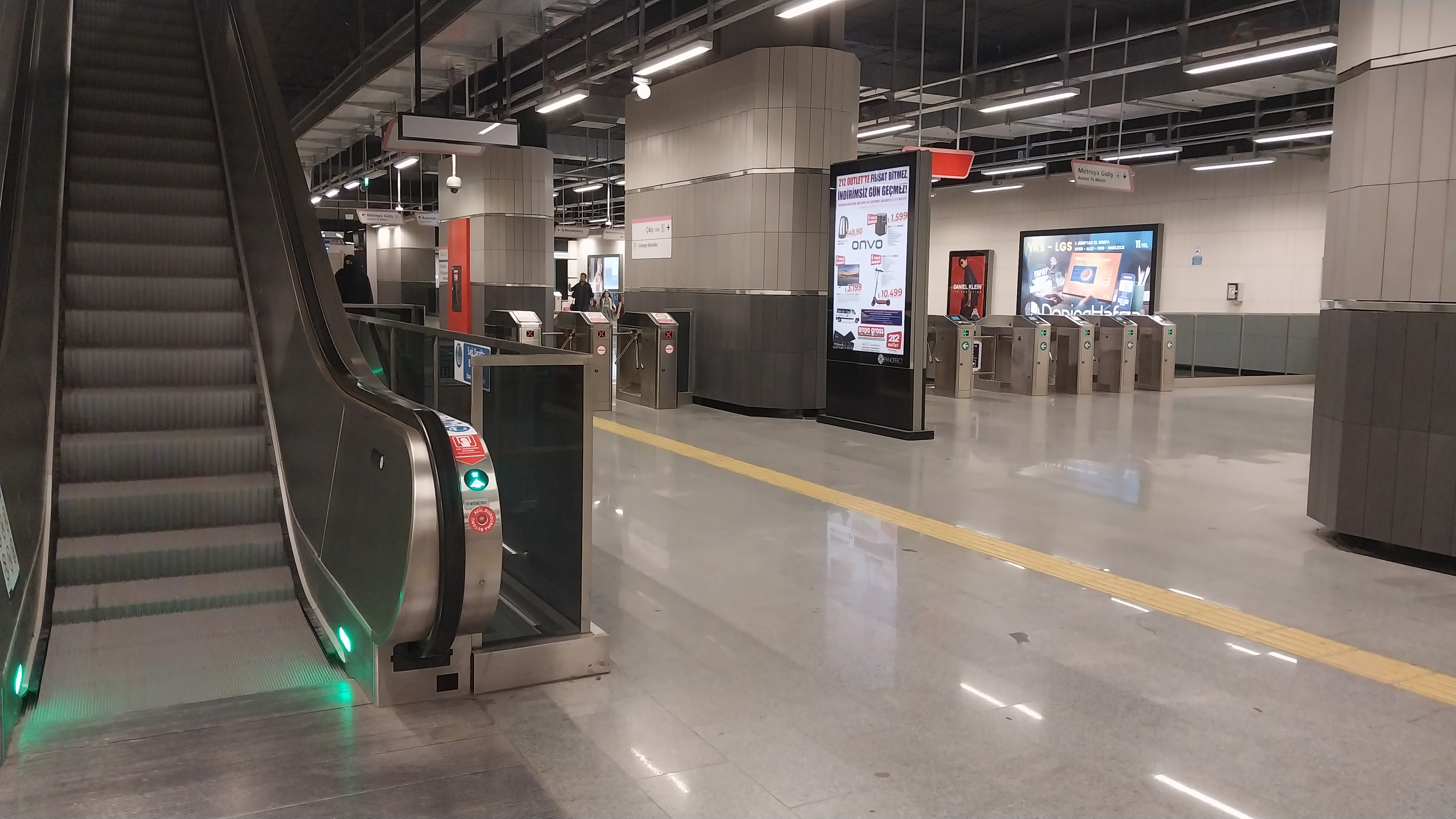
M7 ticket hall

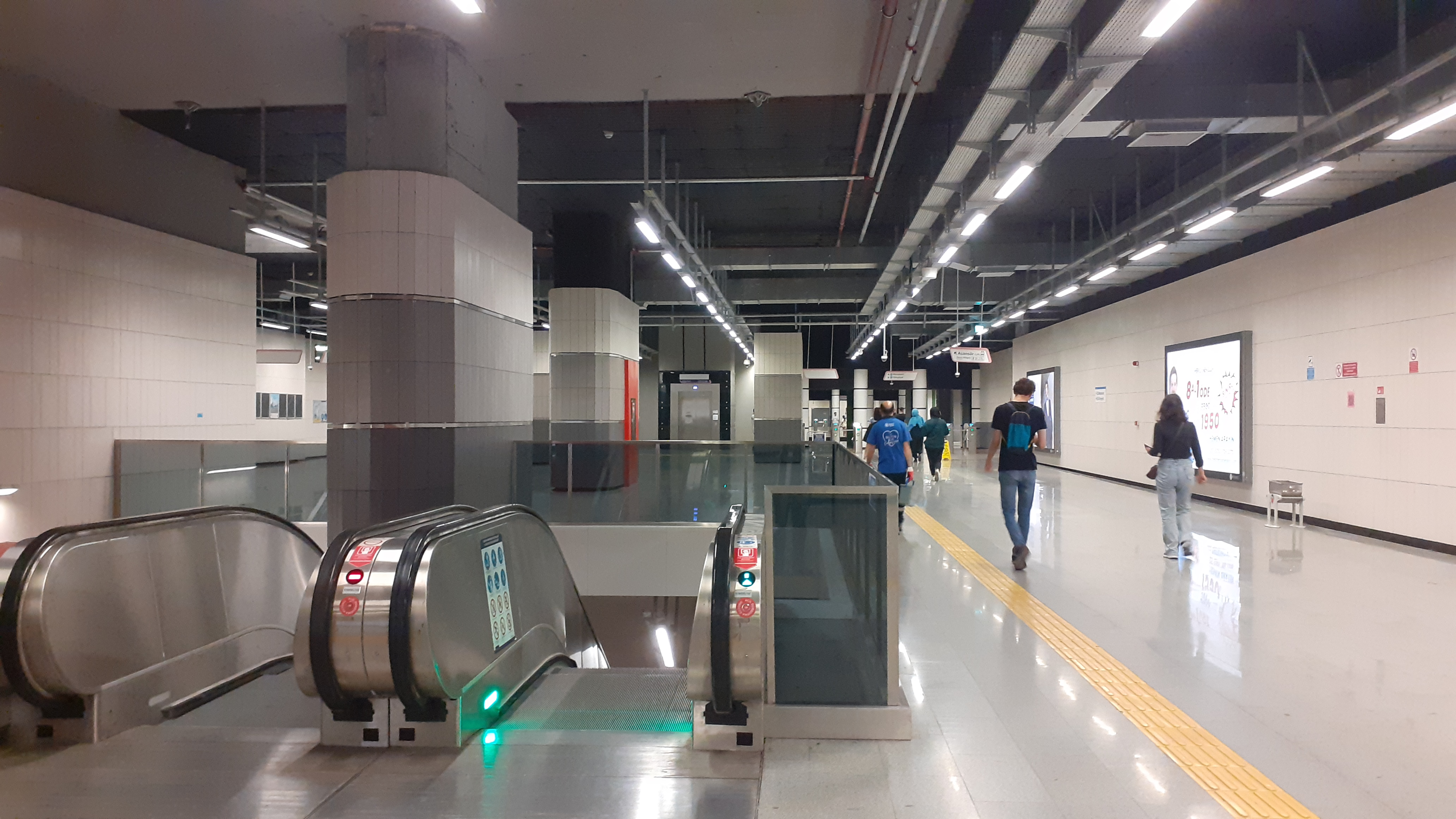
M7 transfer level

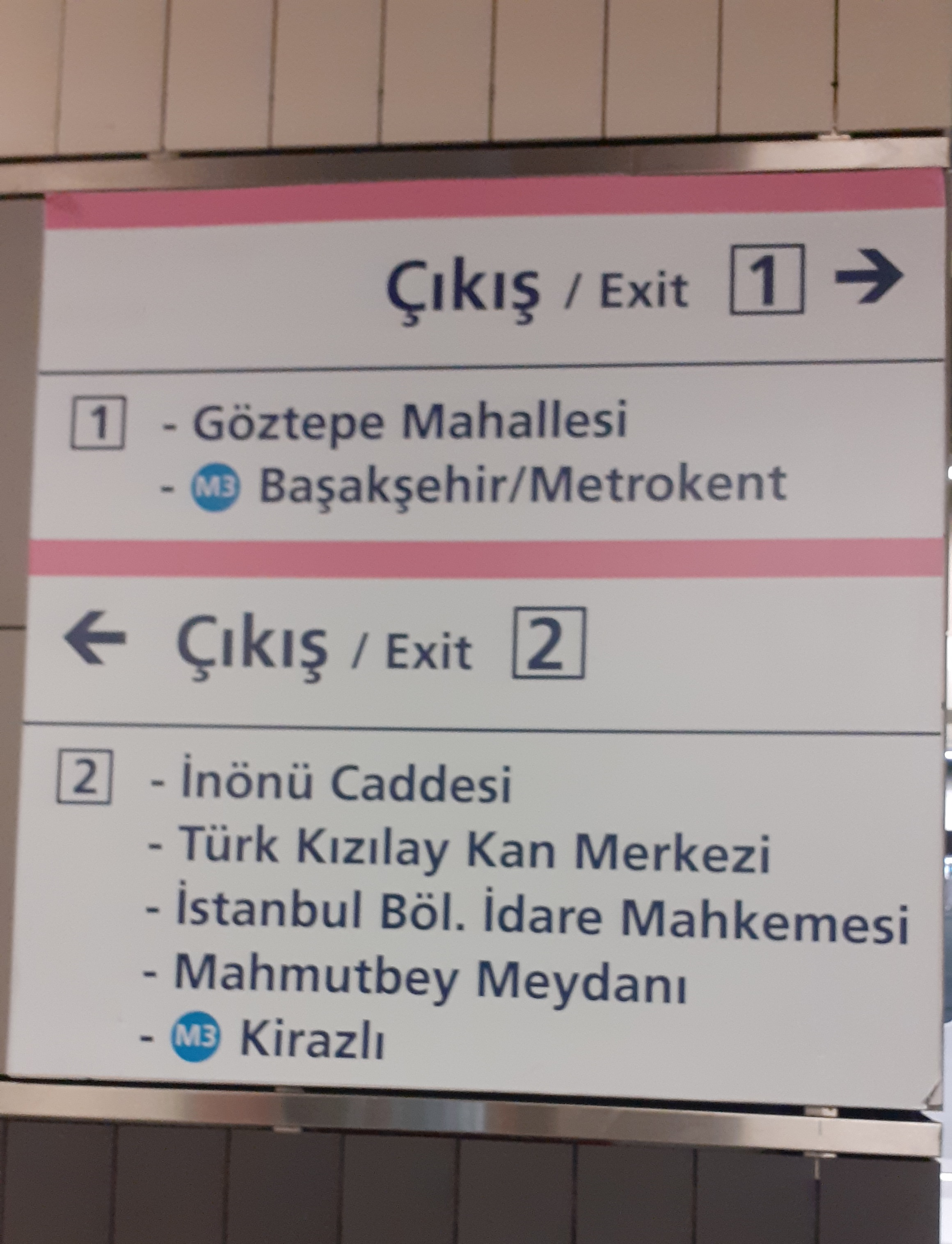
M7 exit sign

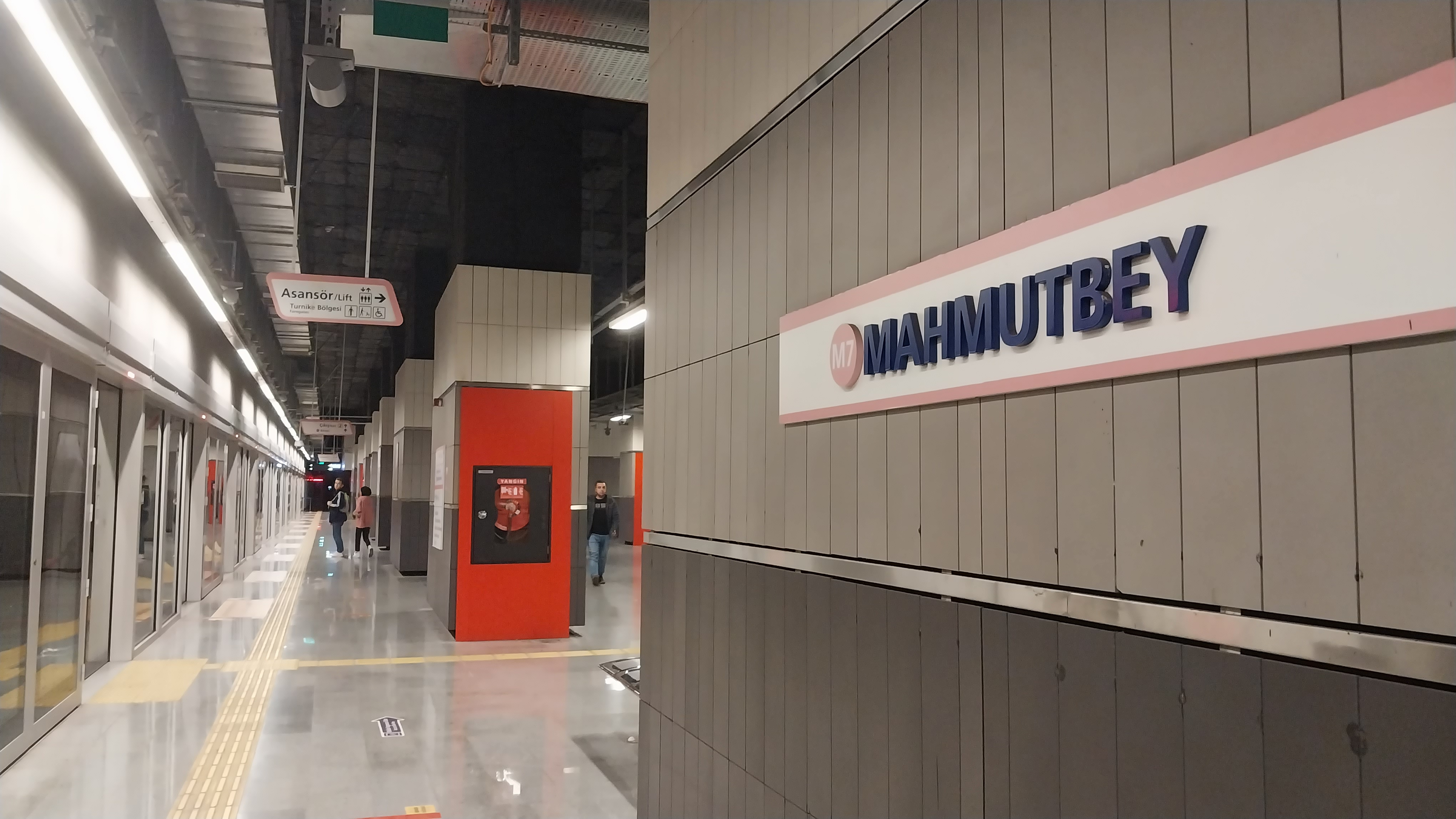
M7 platform

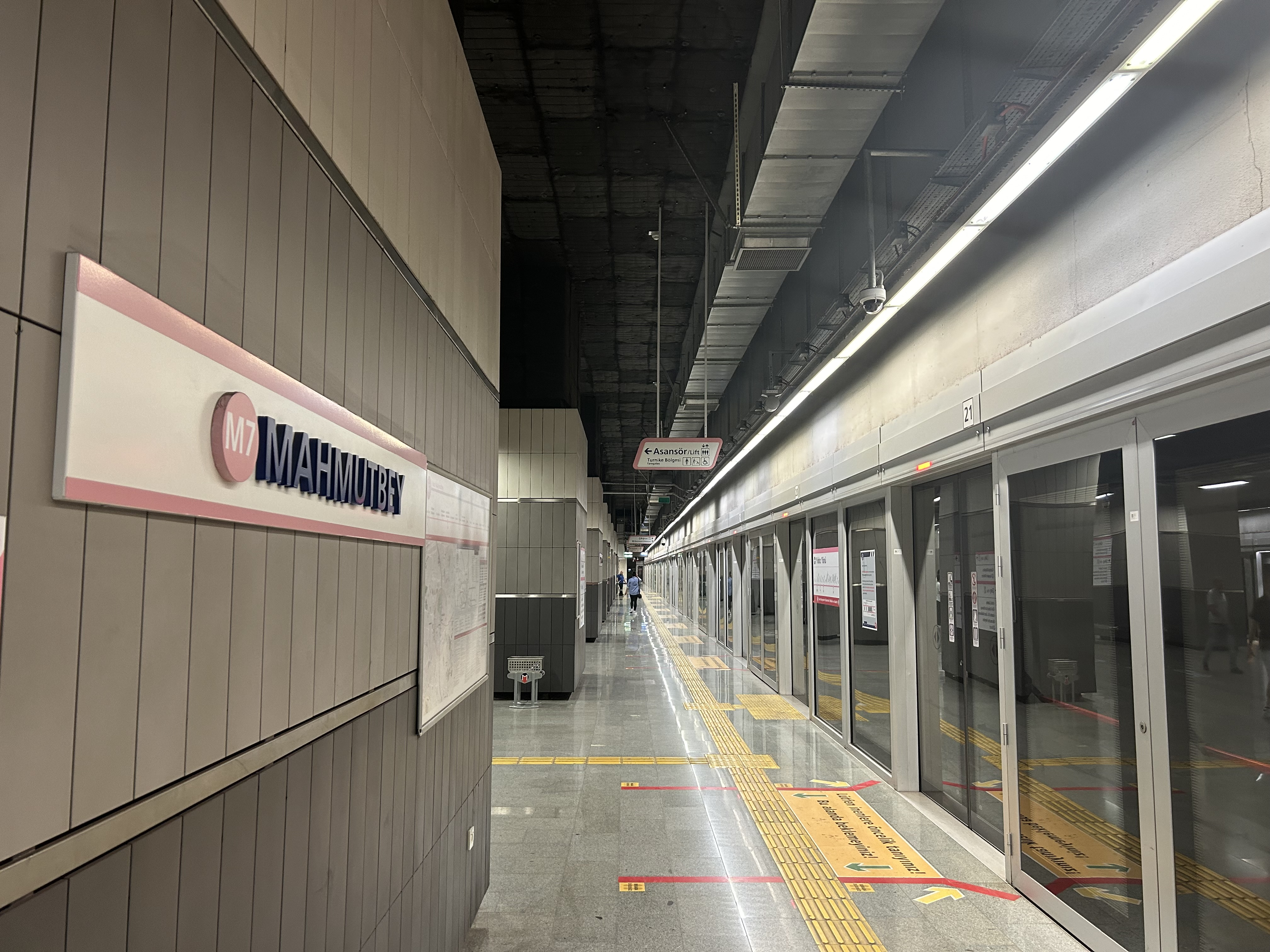
M7 platform

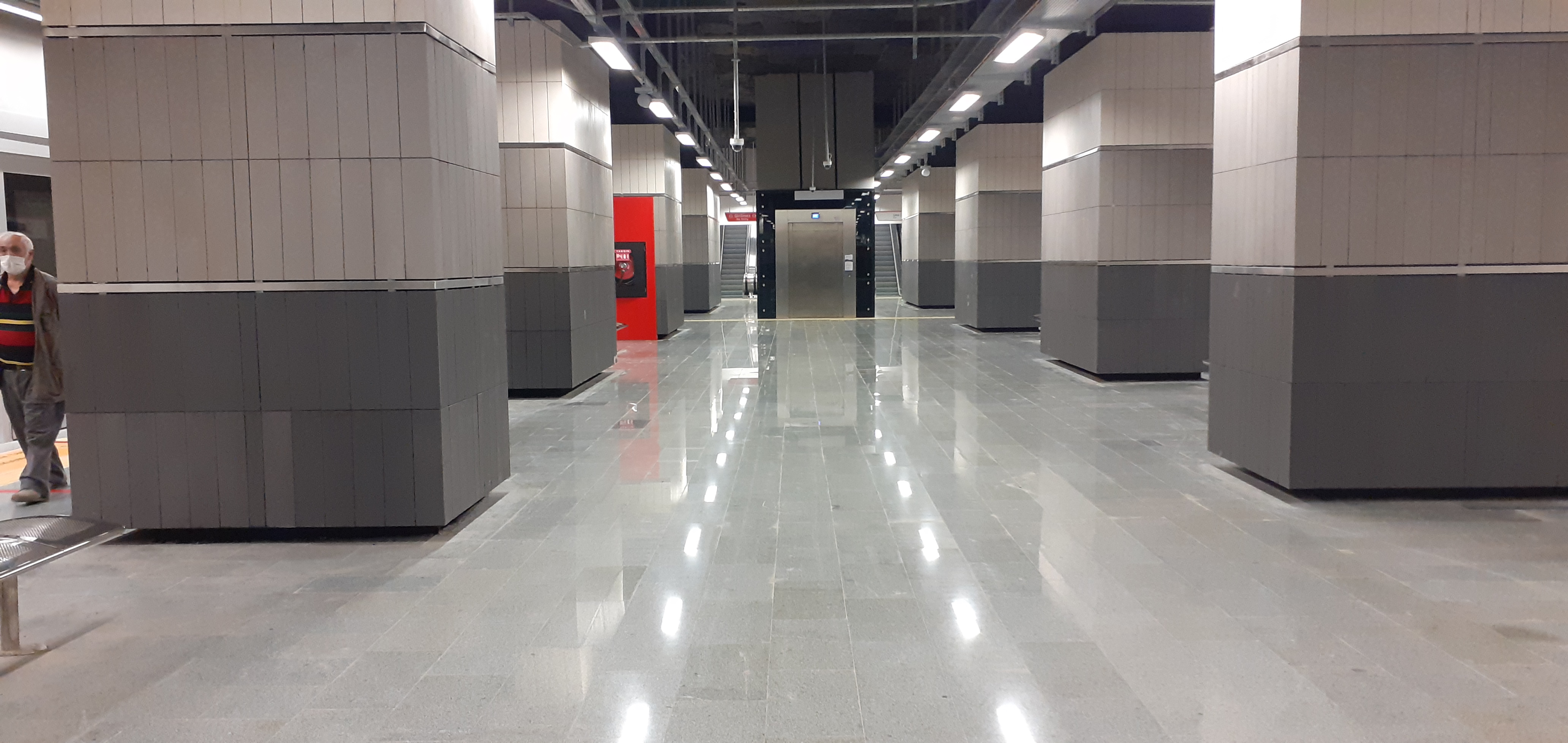
M7 transfer level clearance
