= Alibeyköy station =

Metro station in Istanbul, Turkey

Alibeyköy
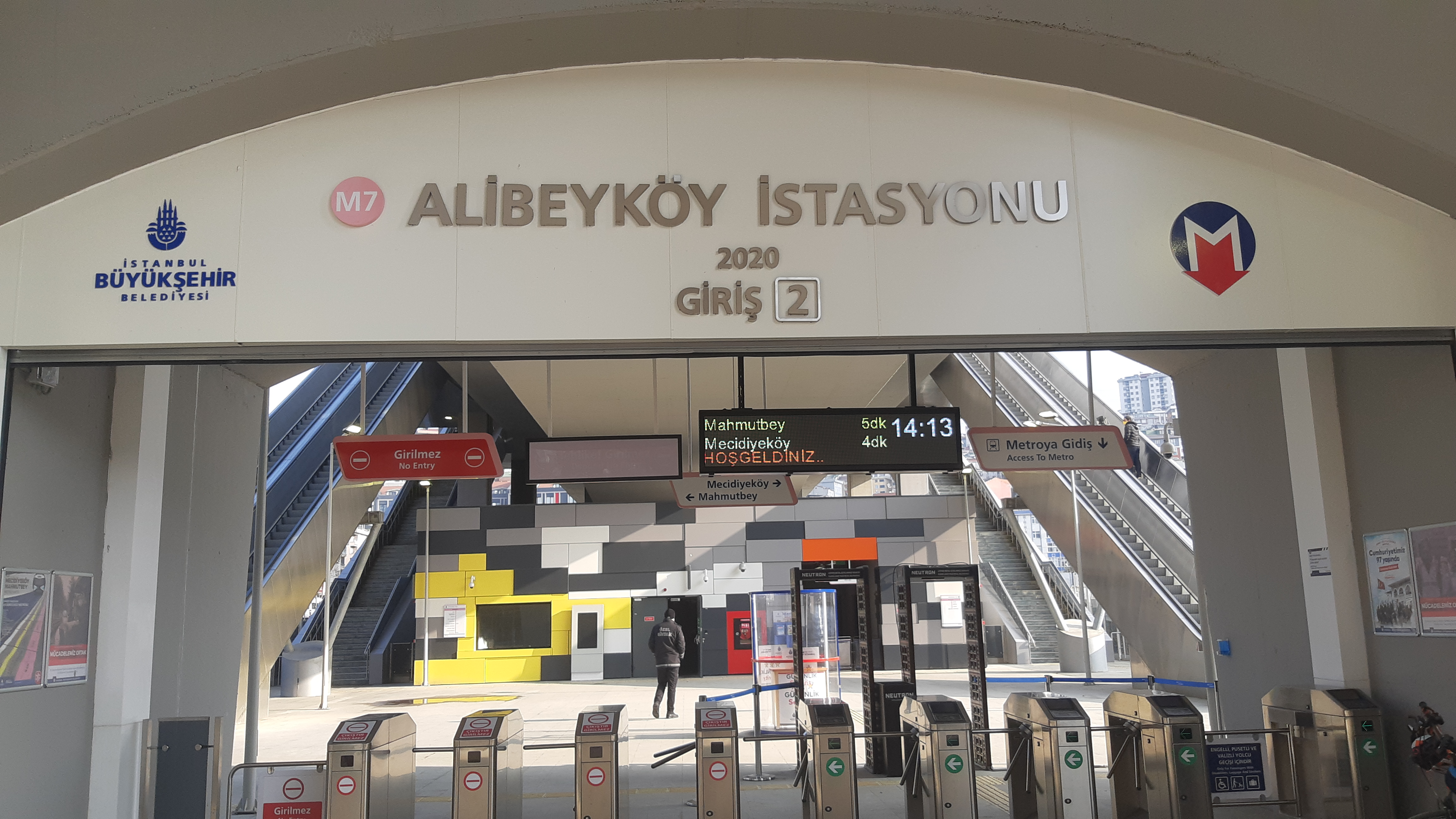
- Alibeyköy Metro Station Entrance 2

General information
- Location: Alibeyköy Neighborhood, Atatürk Street, 34060; Eyüpsultan, Istanbul
- Coordinates: 41.07916°N 28.94933°E
- System: Istanbul Metro rapid transit station
- Owner: Istanbul Metropolitan Municipality
- Operator: Metro Istanbul
- Line: M7
- Platforms: 2 side platform
- Tracks: 2
- Connections: Istanbul Tram: T5 at Alibeyköy Metro; İETT Bus: 50A, 50AT, 50B, 50C, 50D, 50E, 50F, 50H, 50K, 50L, 50M, 50N, 50R, 50S, 50T, 50V, 50Y, 50Z, TM1, TM2, TM3, TM4, TM5, TM6, TM7, TM8, TM9, TM10, TM11, TM12, TM13, TM14, TM15, TM16, TM17, TM18, TM19; Istanbul Minibus Aksaray-Güzeltepe, Güzeltepe-İstoç, Güzeltepe-Gaziosmanpaşa, Gaziosmanpaşa-Eyüpsultan-Göktürk

Construction
- Structure type: Viaduct
- Cycle facilities: Yes
- Accessible: Yes

History
- Opened: 28 October 2020
- Electrified: 1,500 V DC Overhead line

Services
Preceding station	Istanbul Metro	Following station
Çırçır towards Mahmutbey	M7 Line	Nurtepe towards Yıldız
Location

Alibeyköy is a metro station on the M7 line of the Istanbul Metro in Eyüpsultan. The station is located on Atatürk Street in the Alibeyköy neighborhood of Eyüpsultan.

The station is located on a viaduct on Alibeyköy Creek. Access to the platforms of the station is provided by the entrances on both sides of the stream.

The M7 line operates as fully automatic unattended train operation (UTO). The station consists of an island platform with two tracks. Since the M7 is an ATO line, protective gates on each side of the platform open only when a train is in the station.

Connection to Istanbul Tram is available. Alibeyköy metro station was opened on 28 October 2020.

The station has 2 entrances, namely 1 from Mareşal Fevzi Çakmak Street and 2 from Tram.

There is a transfer opportunity to T5 Alibeyköy Metro Tram Station from the 2nd entrance of the station.

There is a transfer opportunity to 50 and TM coded lines, which are bus lines integrated with the tram located on the İETT Alibeyköy Metro platforms from the 1st entrance of the station. In this way, the surroundings of the station have become a transfer center.

The platform floor of the station was built with the viaduct method. There is seismic isolation on the viaduct legs and it was built to be earthquake resistant.

== Station layout ==
Platform level	Side platform, doors will open on the right
Platform level	Westbound	← toward Mahmutbey (Çırçır)
Platform level	Eastbound	toward Mecidiyeköy (Nurtepe) →
Platform level	Side platform, doors will open on the right

== Operation information ==
As of 2021, total length of M7 line is 18 km. The line operates between 06.00 - 00.00 and travel frequency is 6 minutes at peak hour.

== Gallery ==
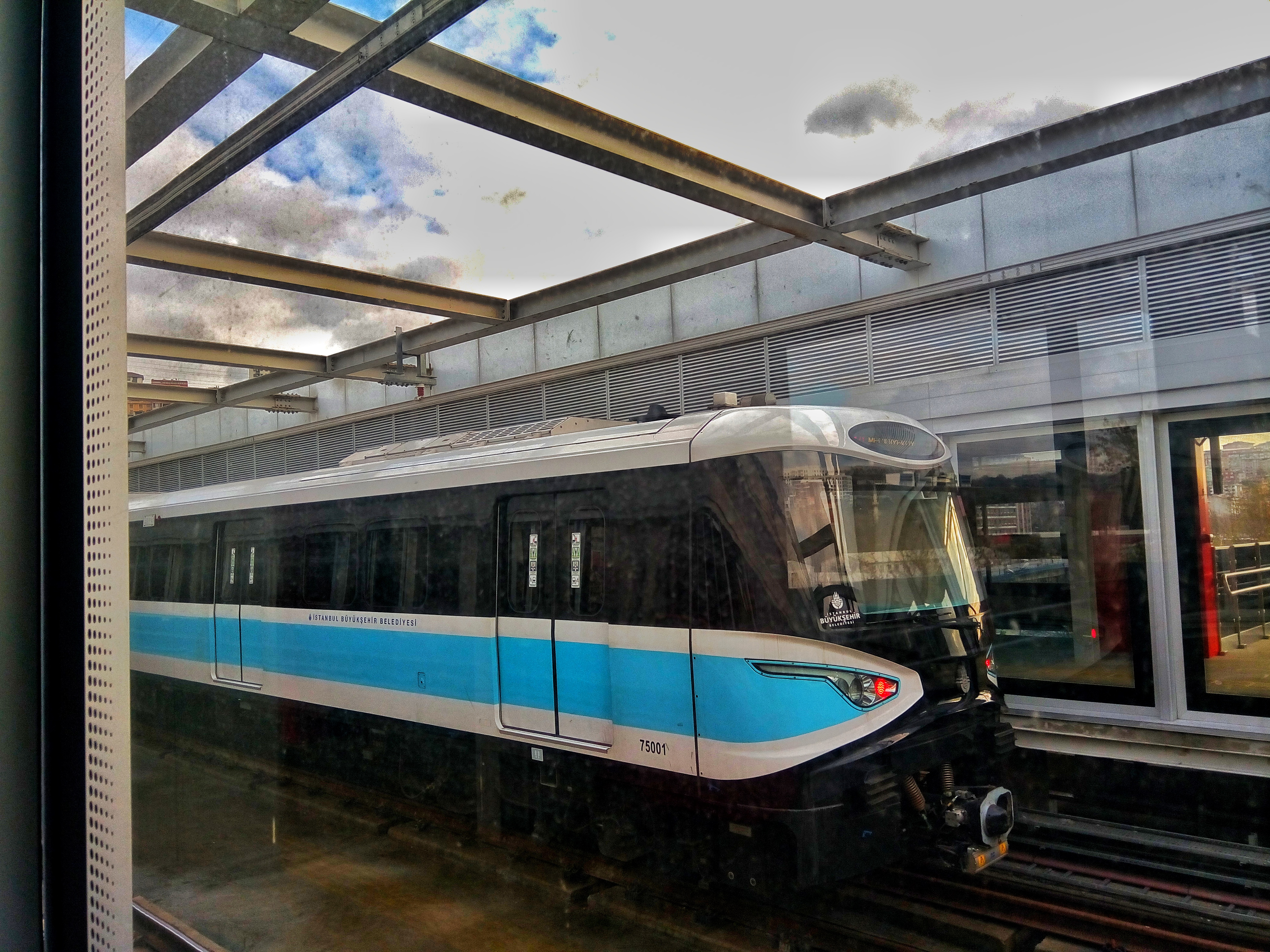
M7 Alibeyköy Station

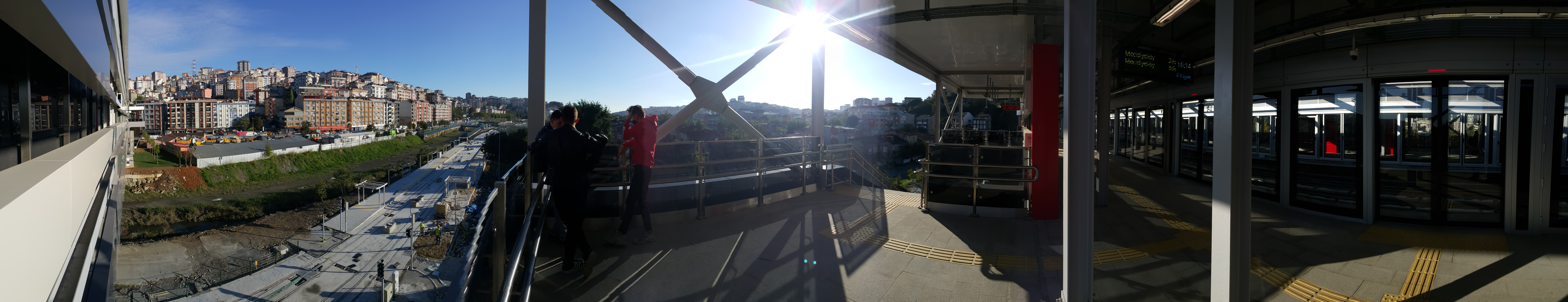
Alibeyköy Metro Station Panoramic View
