= Nurtepe station =

Metro station in Istanbul, Turkey

Nurtepe
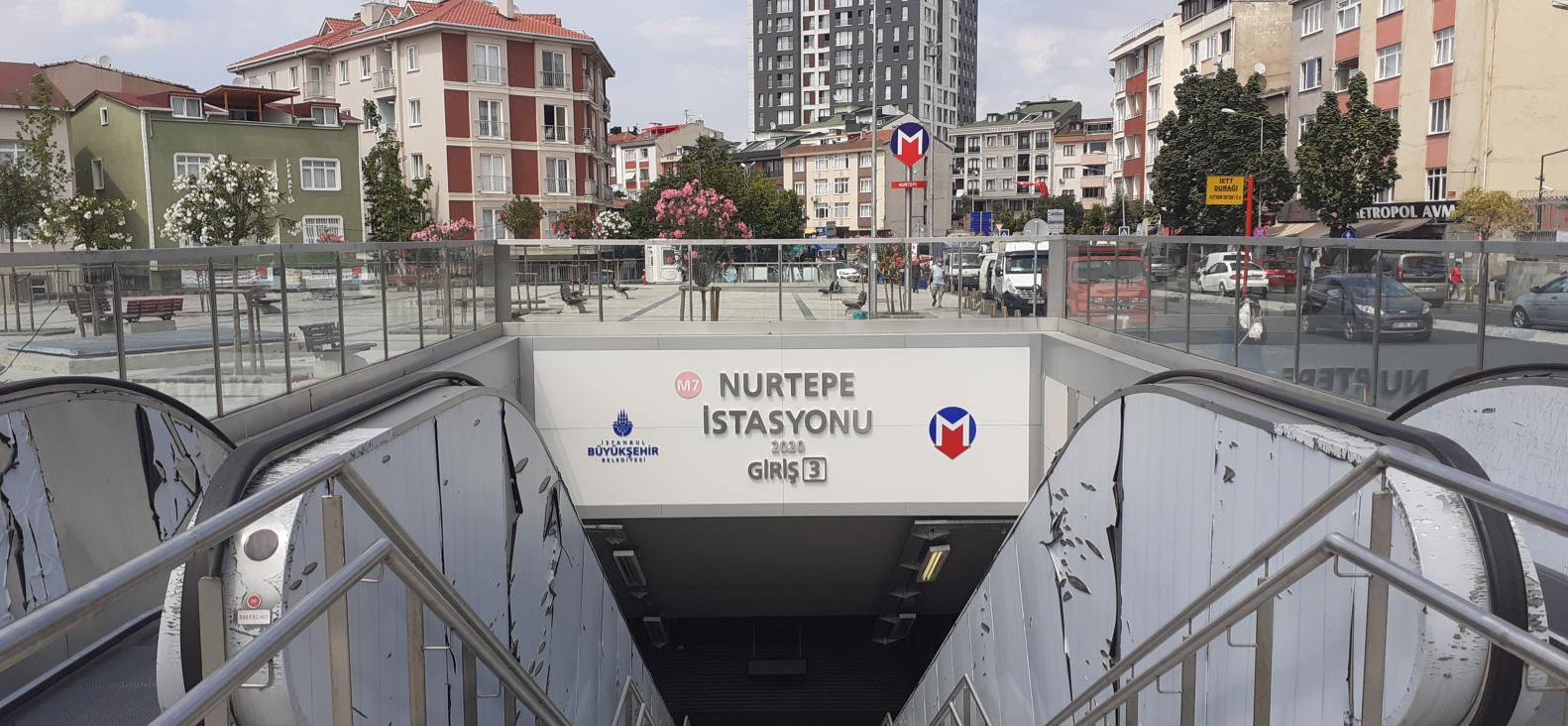
- Nurtepe Metro Station Entrance 3

General information
- Location: Nurtepe Neighborhood, Sokollu Street, 34060; Kağıthane, Istanbul
- Coordinates: 41.080659°N 28.9633407°E
- System: Istanbul Metro rapid transit station
- Owner: Istanbul Metropolitan Municipality
- Operator: Metro Istanbul
- Line: M7
- Platforms: 1 island platform
- Tracks: 2
- Connections: İETT Bus: 48N, 62G, 62H, TM1, TM2; Istanbul Minibus Şişli-Güzeltepe, Güzeltepe-Aksaray, Güzeltepe-İstoç, Güzeltepe-Gaziosmanpaşa

Construction
- Structure type: Underground
- Cycle facilities: Yes
- Accessible: Yes

History
- Opened: 28 October 2020
- Electrified: 1,500 V DC Overhead line

Services
Preceding station	Istanbul Metro	Following station
Alibeyköy towards Mahmutbey	M7 Line	Kağıthane towards Yıldız
Location

Nurtepe is an underground station on the M7 line of the Istanbul Metro in Kağıthane. The station is located on Sokollu Street in the Nurtepe neighborhood of Kağıthane.

The station has a total of 3 entrances, the entrance number 1 is Nurtepe Mosque, entrance number 2 is Sokollu Street/Zühre Street and entrance number 3 is Hacı Ethem Üktem Primary School.

The M7 line operates as fully automatic unattended train operation (UTO). The station consists of an island platform with two tracks. Since the M7 is an ATO line, protective gates on each side of the platform open only when a train is in the station.

Connection to IETT city buses is available from at street level.

Nurtepe station was opened on 28 October 2020. The station was built between Alibeyköy Creek and Kâğıthane Creek.

== Station layout ==
Z	Enter/Exit ↓ (1)	Enter/Exit ↓ (2-3)
B1	Ticket Hall ↓	Ticket Hall↓	← Underpass
B2	Underpass -2 ↓	↓
B3	Underpass -3 ↓	↓
B4	Underpass-4 ↓	↓
B5	Platform	Platform

Platform level	Westbound	← toward Mahmutbey (Alibeyköy)
Platform level	Island platform, doors will open on the left
Platform level	Eastbound	toward Mecidiyeköy (Kağıthane) →

== Operation information ==
As of 2021, total length of M7 line is 18 km. The line operates between 06.00 - 00.00 and travel frequency is 6 minutes at peak hour.
