= Kağıthane station =

Station of the Istanbul Metro

Kağıthane (M7) Kağıthane (M11)
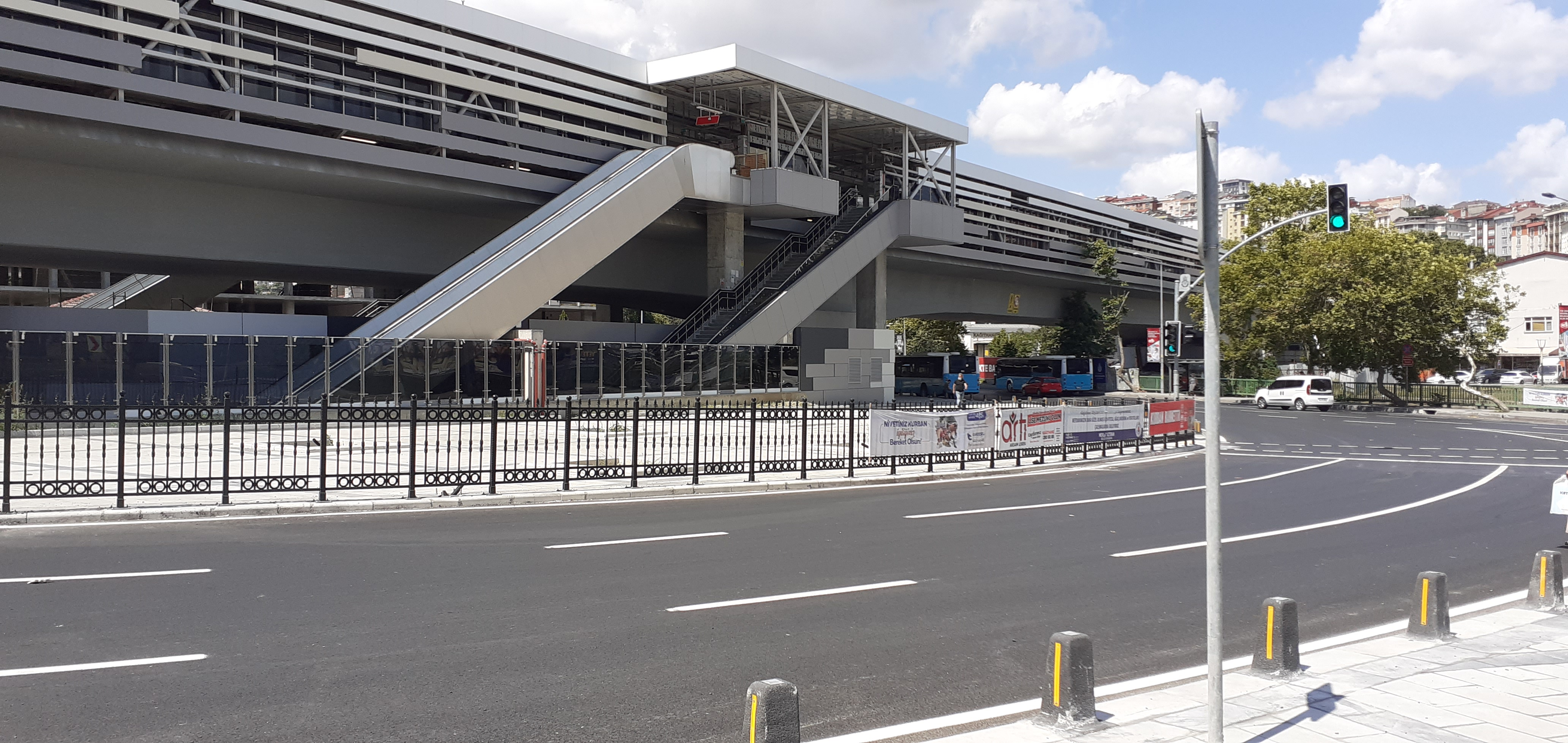

General information
- Location: Cendere Cd., Merkez Mah. 34406; Kağıthane, Istanbul
- Coordinates: 41.0804°N 28.9710°E
- System: Istanbul Metro rapid transit station
- Owner: Istanbul Metropolitan Municipality, Ministry of Transport and Infrastructure
- Operator: Metro Istanbul (M7), Ministry of Transport and Infrastructure (M11)
- Lines: M7; M11
- Platforms: M7: 2 Side platforms M11: 1 Island platform
- Tracks: 4
- Connections: İETT Bus: 41ST, 46Ç, 46T, 48, 48H, 48N, 48T, 50D, 62, 63, 64Ç, 65A, 65G, K1, K2, K3, K4, TM3; Istanbul Minibus: Şişli - Çağlayan - Hamidiye - Başak Konutları, Şişli - Kemer - Göktürk, Şişli - Nurtepe - Güzeltepe, Seyrantepe - Topkapı

Construction
- Structure type: Elevated (M7), Underground (M11)
- Depth: 25 metres (82 ft) (M11 platform)
- Parking: No
- Cycle facilities: Yes
- Accessible: Yes

History
- Opened: : 28 October 2020 (5 years ago) : 22 January 2023 (3 years ago)
- Electrified: 1,500 V DC Overhead line

Services
Preceding station	Istanbul Metro	Following station
Nurtepe towards Mahmutbey	M7 Line	Çağlayan towards Yıldız
Hasdal towards Halkalı	M11 Line	Gayrettepe Terminus
Location

Kağıthane is a rapid transit interchange station between the M7 and M11 lines of the Istanbul Metro. The M7 platform located above ground on the metro viaducts crossing the Kağıthane Creek, while the M11 platform is in underground. The M7 platform of the complex opened on 28 October 2020, and the M11 platform opened on 22 January 2023.

Kağıthane station was originally planned to be completed in 2017, however construction delays pushed the opening back to first 2018, then 2019, and eventually to October 2020. The complex is the first metro station within central Kağıthane.

The viaduct legs have seismic isolation and are constructed to be earthquake resistant.

There is a walking distance of approximately 230 meters from the entrance number 1 of the m7 Station to the M11 Kağıthane Metro Station, and there is a transfer opportunity between the stations.

It is planned to build new stations underground and provide integration between the lines for the HızRay / M34 (Beylikdüzü – Sabiha Gökçen Airport) High Speed Metro Line and M? (İTÜ – Kağıthane) Metro Line, which are in the project phase until the end of 2029.

== Layout ==
M7 Platform

Side platform, doors will open on the right
Westbound	← toward Mahmutbey (Nurtepe)
Eastbound	toward Mecidiyeköy (Çağlayan) →
Side platform, doors will open on the right

M11 Platform

Northbound	← toward Halkalı - Istanbul Airport (Hasdal)
Island platform, doors will open on the left
Southbound	toward Gayrettepe (terminus) →

== Gallery ==
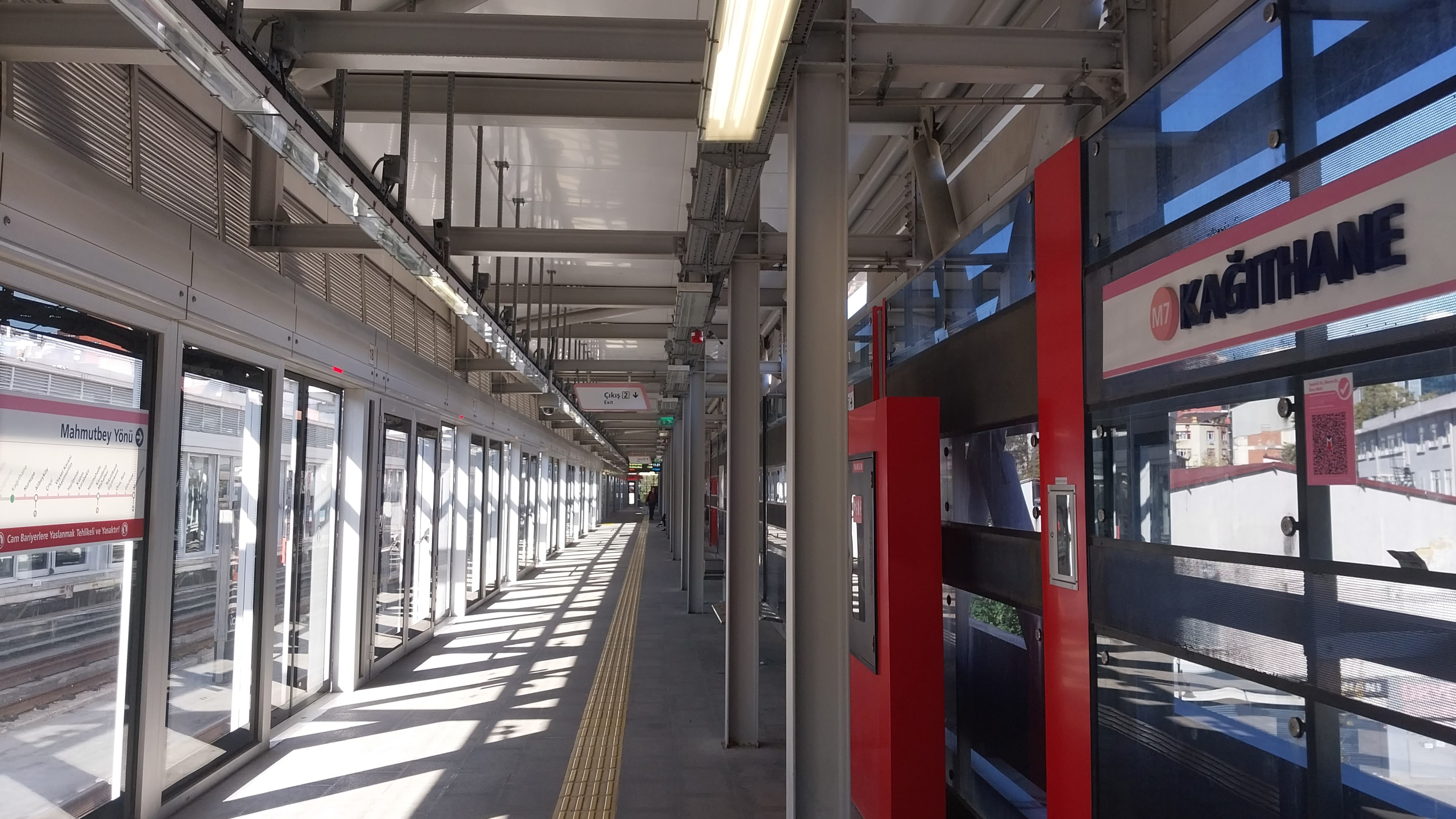
M7 platform

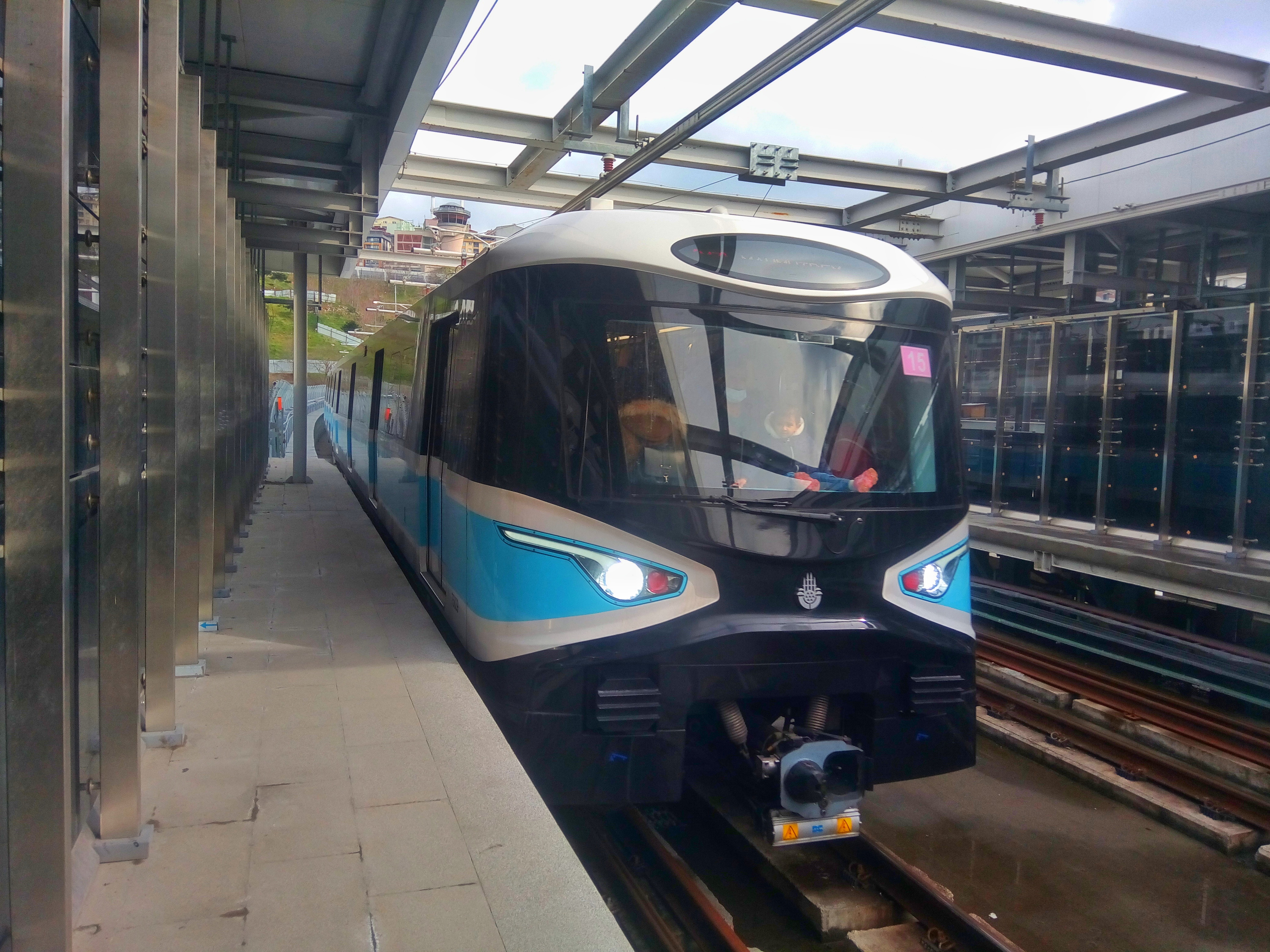
M7 train coming to Kağıthane Station

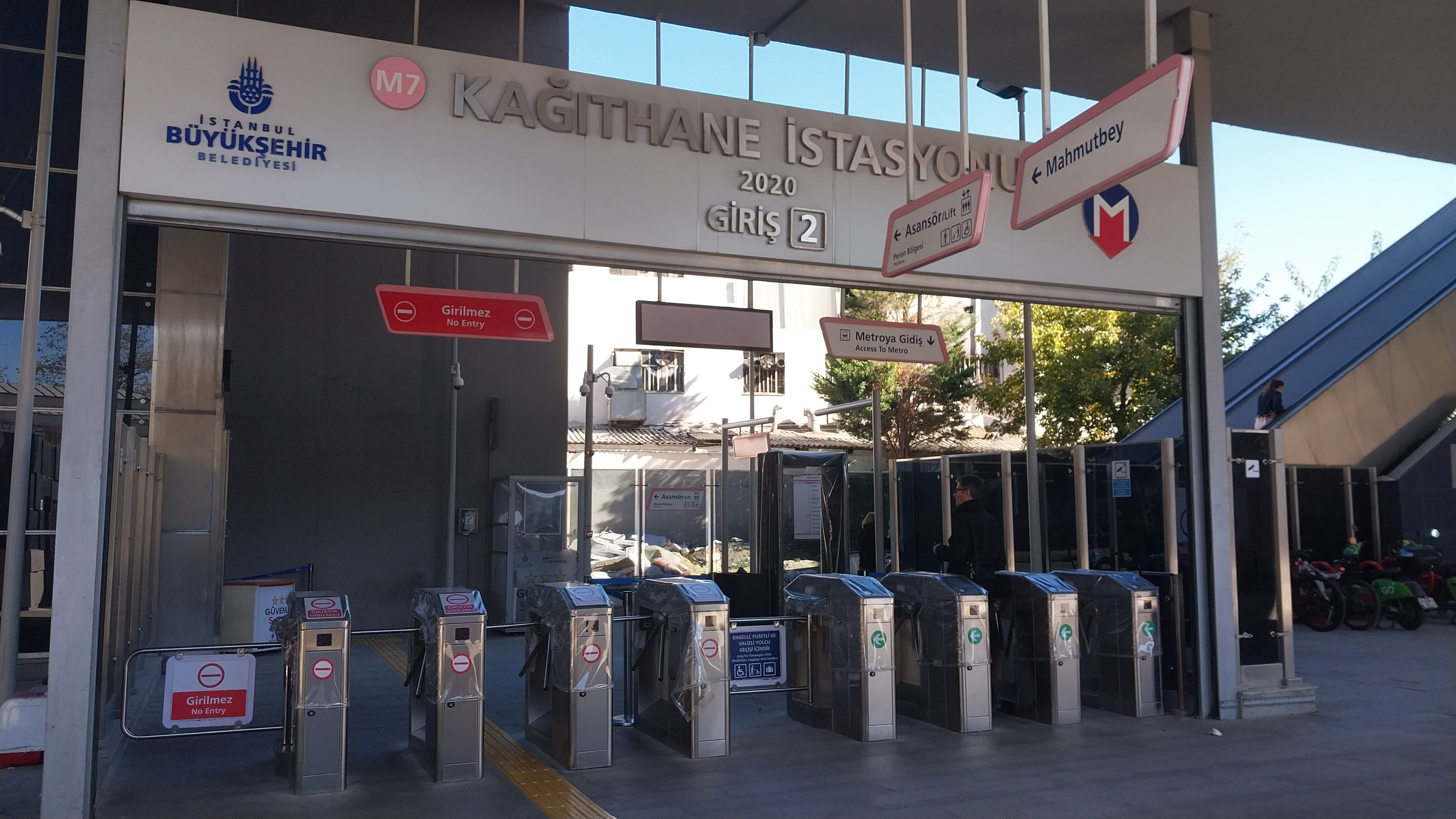
M7 Kağıthane Metro Entrance 2

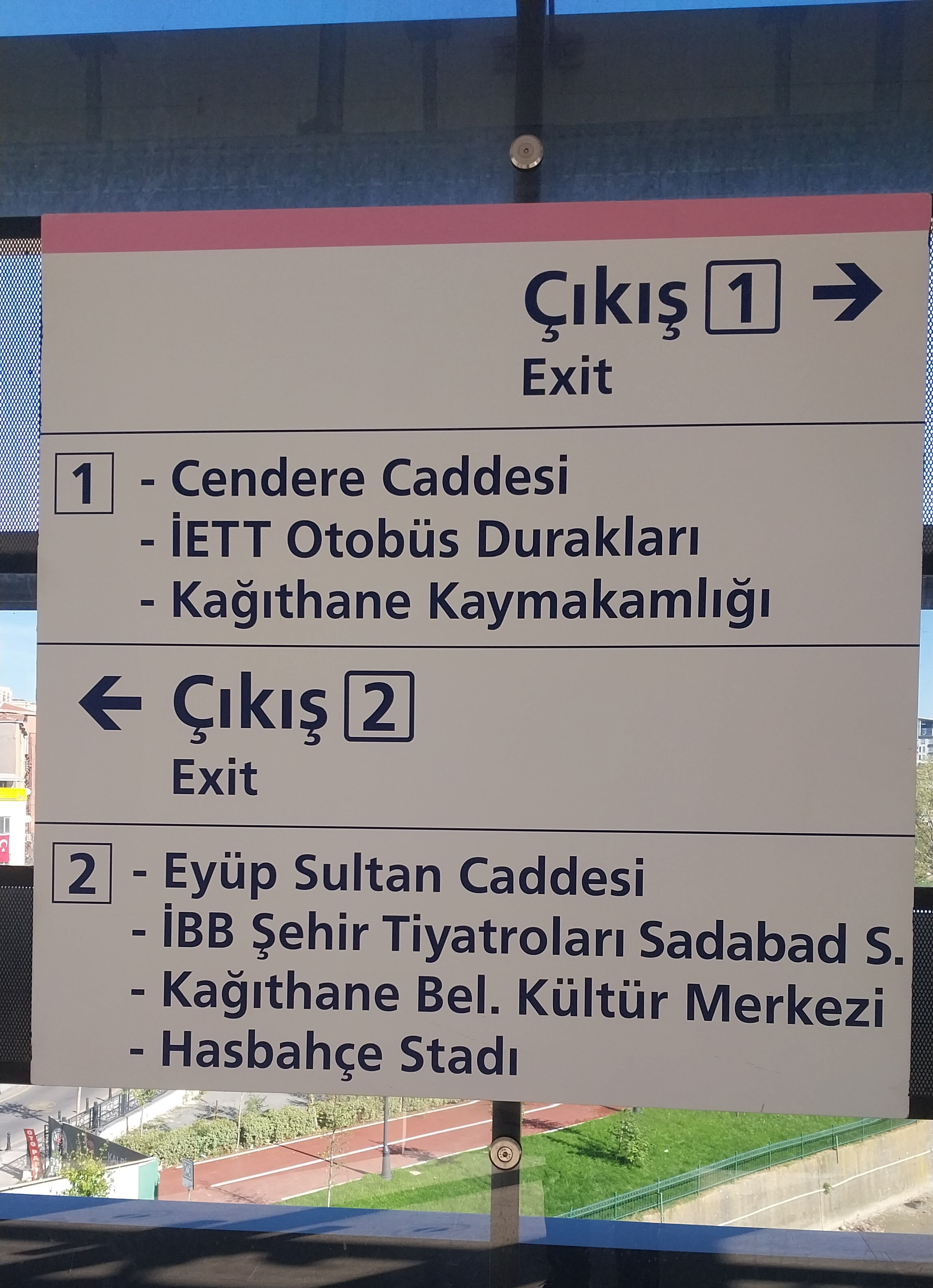
M7 Kağıthane Metro Exits (Before M11 opened)

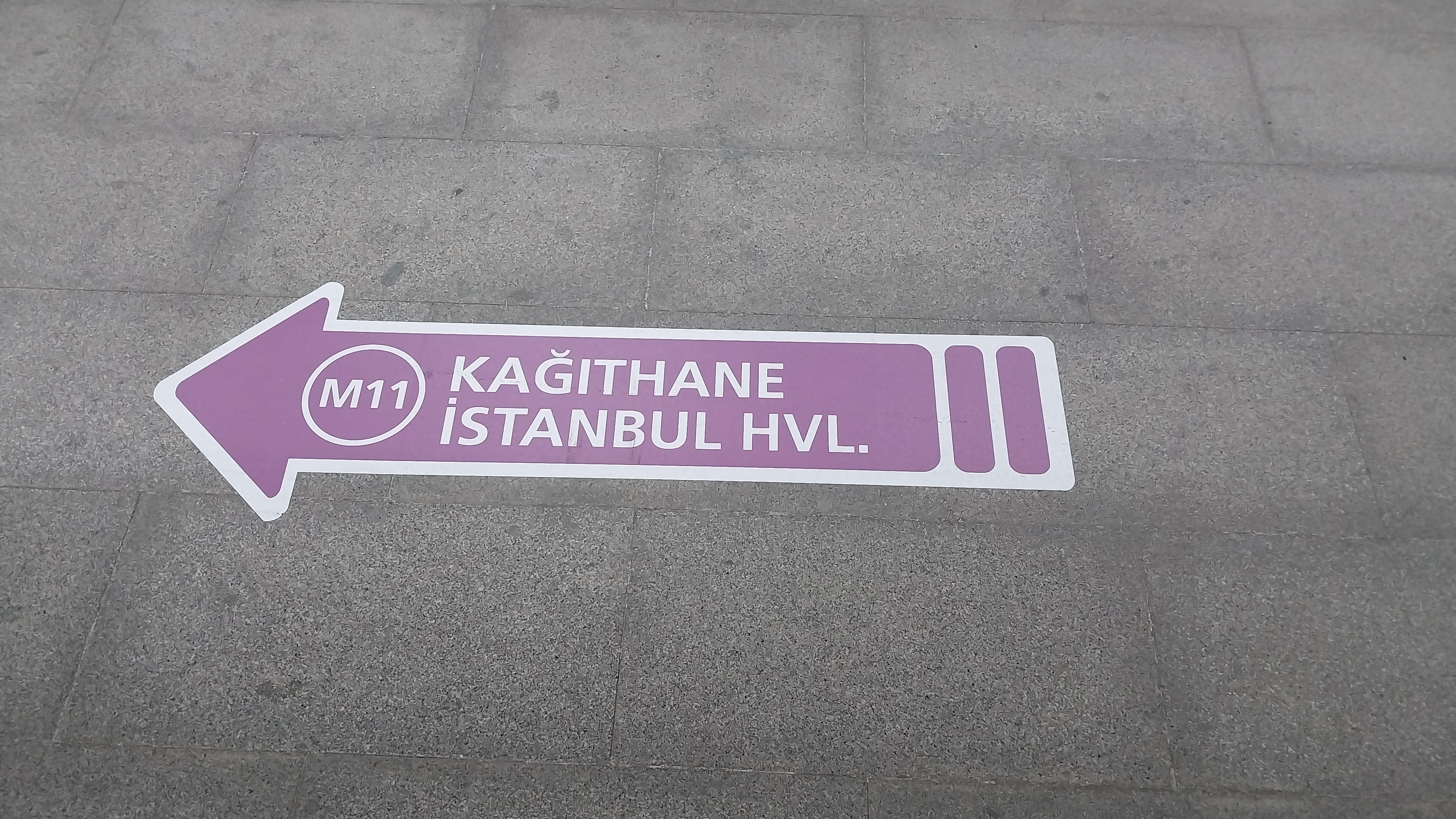
M11 transfer signs on the ground at M7 Kağıthane station

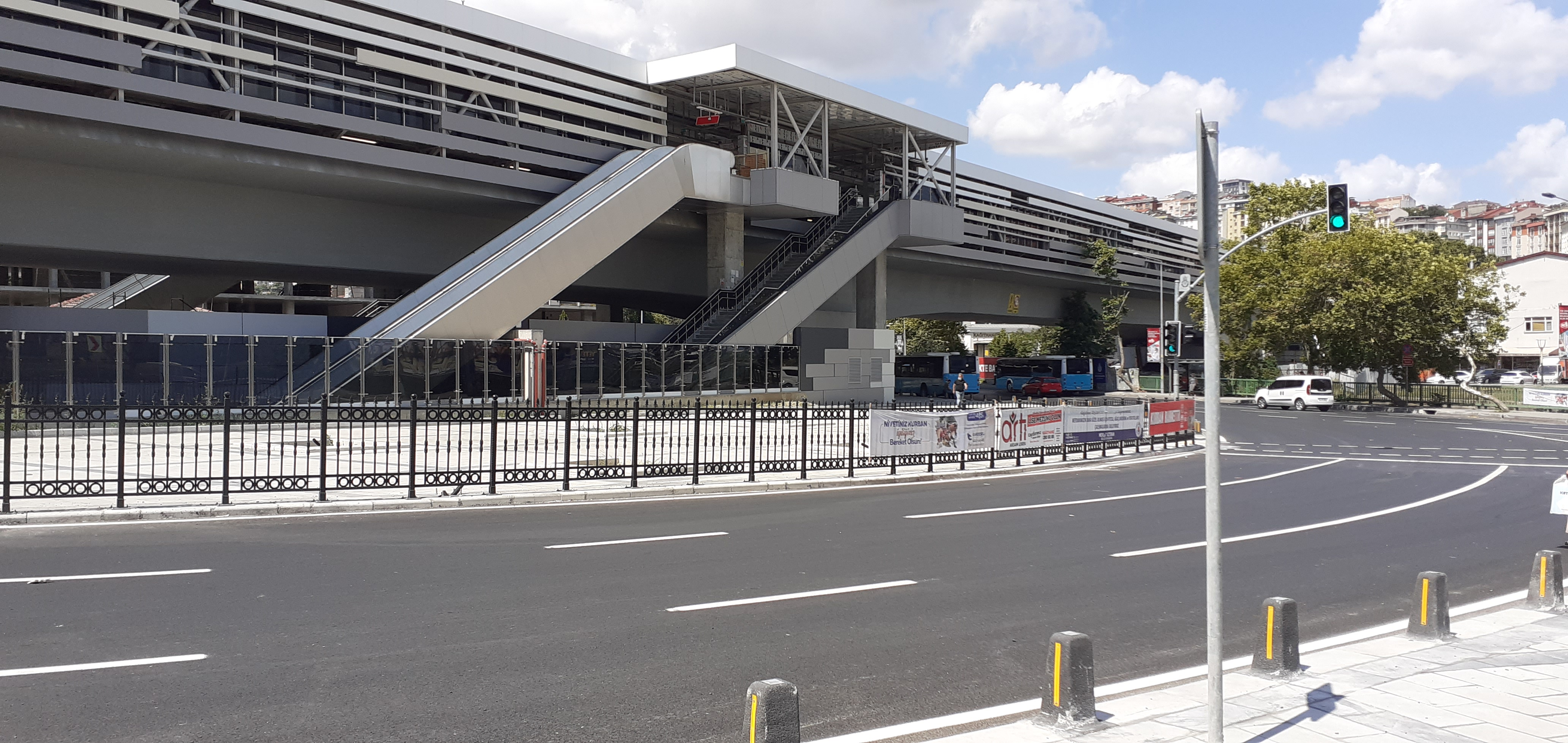
M7 Kağıthane Station

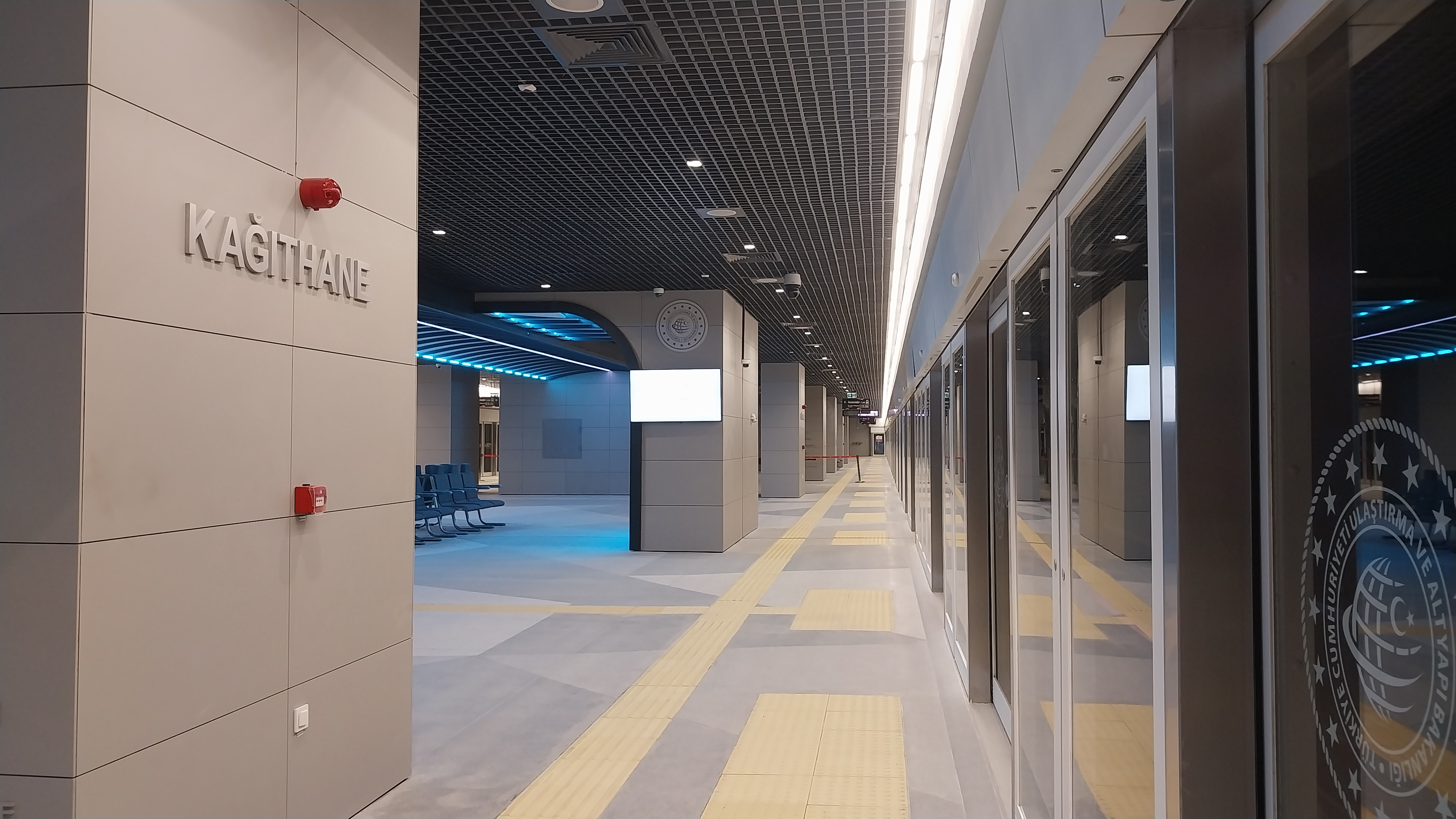
M11 platform

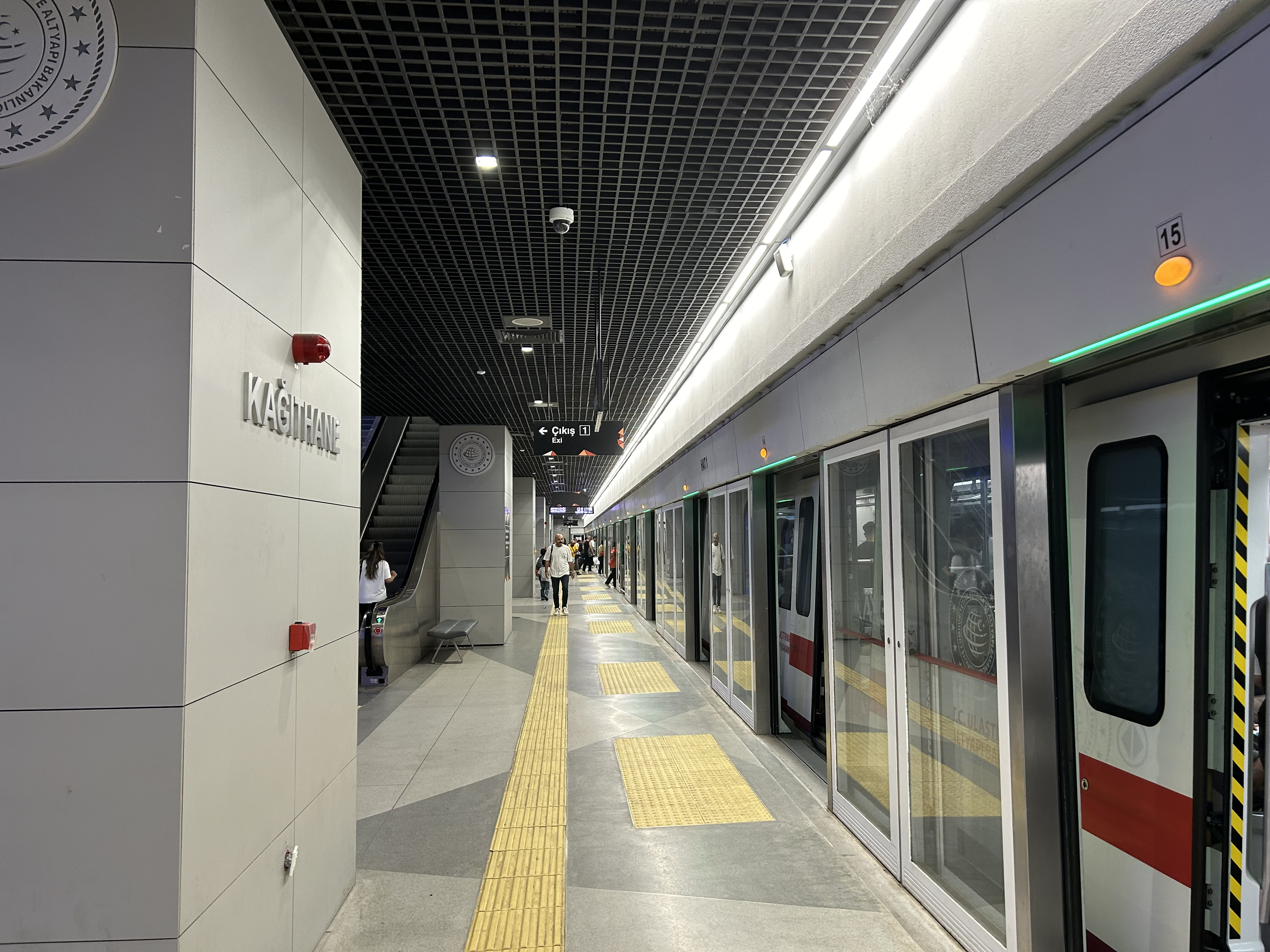
Kağıthane Station M11

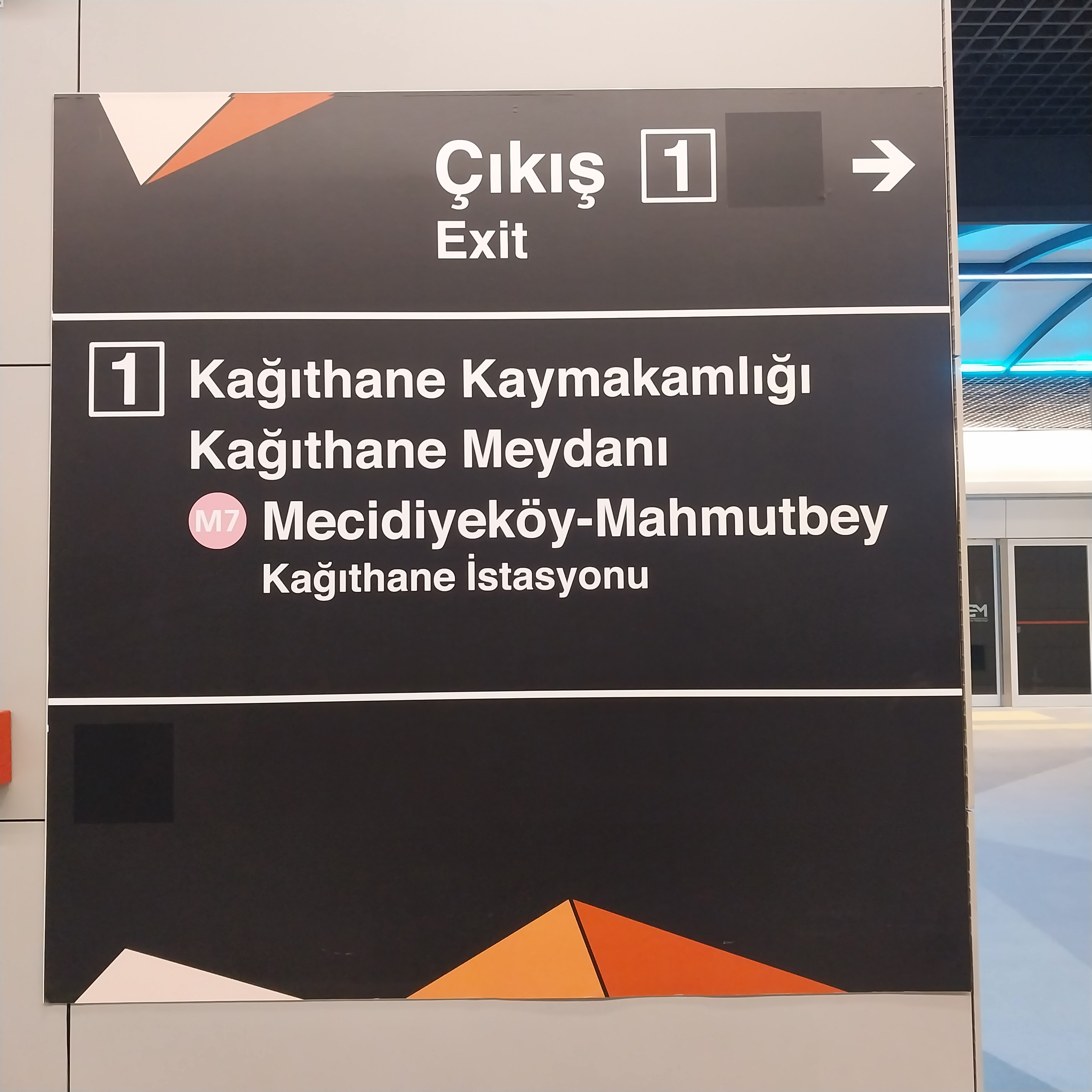
M11 Kağıthane Station Exit

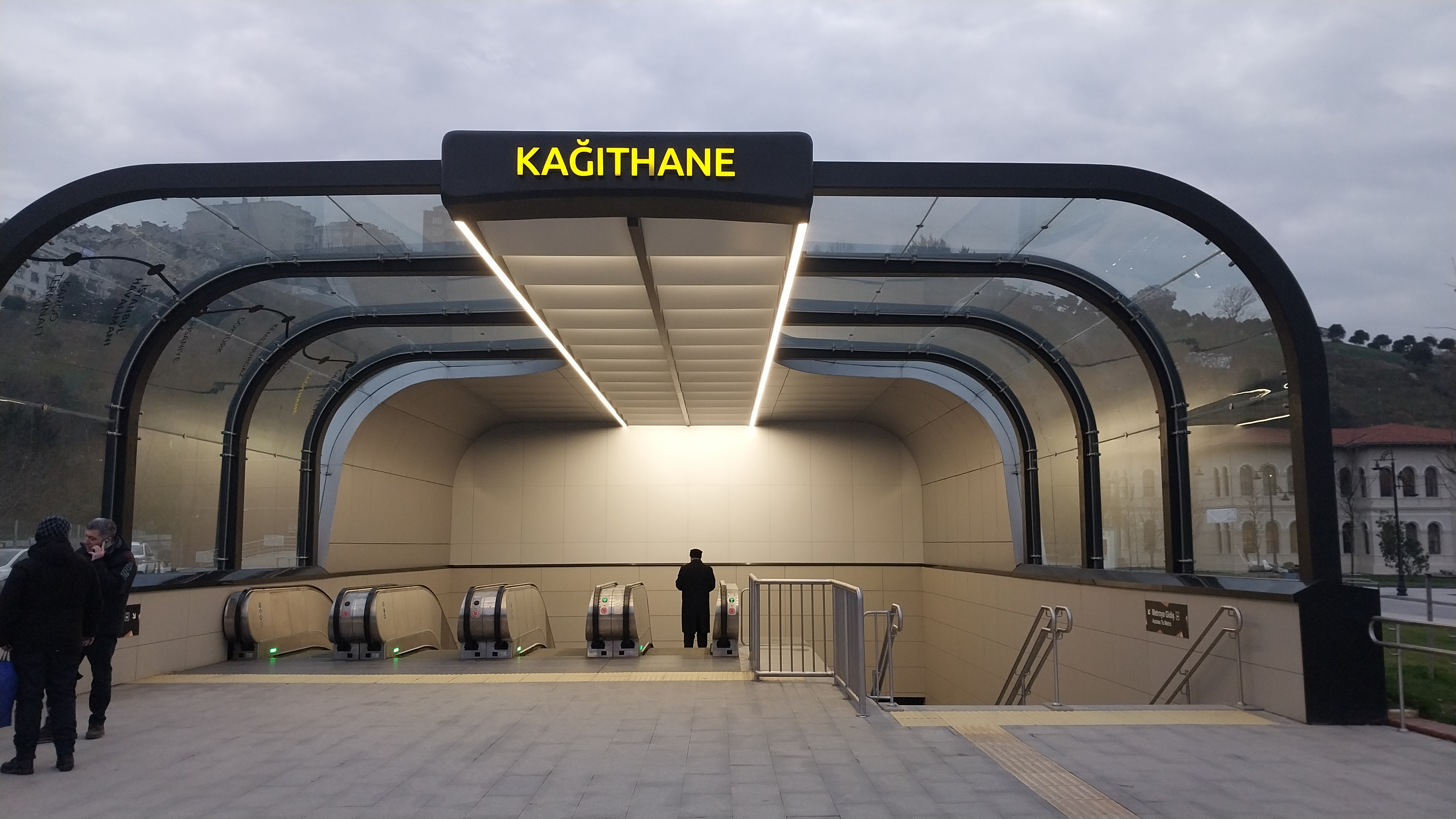
M11 exit
