= Çağlayan station =

Metro station in Istanbul, Turkey

Çağlayan
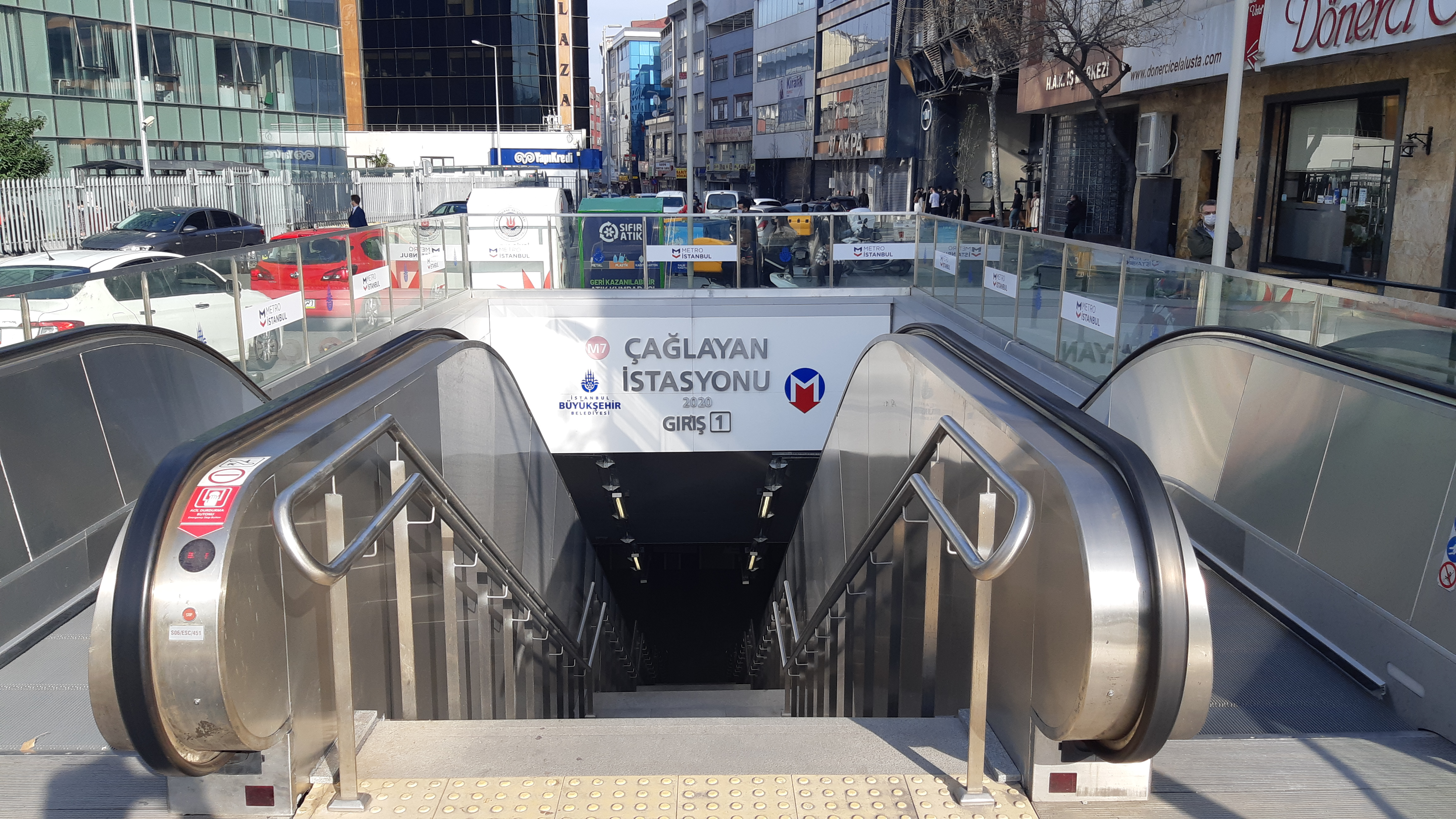
- Çağlayan Metro Station Entrance 1

General information
- Location: Çağlayan Neighborhood, Abide-i Hürriyet Street, 34403; Kağıthane, Istanbul
- Coordinates: 41.071434°N 28.979747°E
- System: Istanbul Metro rapid transit station
- Owner: Istanbul Metropolitan Municipality
- Operator: Metro Istanbul
- Line: M7
- Platforms: 1 island platform
- Tracks: 2
- Connections: İETT Bus:46Ç, 46E, 46H, 46T, 48, 48H, 48N, 49, 49B, 50C, 65A, 77A, K4; Istanbul Minibus: Çağlayan-Topkapı Şişhane-Şişli, Şişli-Başak Konutları, Şişli-Göktürk, Şişli-Güzeltepe, Şişli-Zincirdere

Construction
- Structure type: Underground
- Parking: No
- Cycle facilities: Yes
- Accessible: Yes

History
- Opened: 28 October 2020
- Electrified: 1,500 V DC Overhead line

Services
Preceding station	Istanbul Metro	Following station
Kağıthane towards Mahmutbey	M7 Line	Şişli—Mecidiyeköy towards Yıldız
Location

Çağlayan is an underground station on the M7 line of the Istanbul Metro in Kağıthane. The station is located on Abide-i Hürriyet Street in the Çağlayan neighborhood of Kağıthane.

The station, located to the north of the Istanbul Justice Palace, has 3 entrance / exit points. There are only 12 escalators in the east entrance ( number 1) and are not suitable for disabled passengers. On the western entrances, (entrance number 2 and 3) there are 4 escalators and 3 elevators between the street level and the turnstile floor; There are only 12 elevators between the turnstile floor and the platform floor and are suitable for disabled passengers.

The M7 line operates as fully automatic unattended train operation (UTO). The station consists of an island platform with two tracks. Since the M7 is an ATO line, protective gates on each side of the platform open only when a train is in the station.

Connection to IETT city buses is available from at street level.

Çağlayan station was opened on 28 October 2020.

== Station layout ==
Z	Enter/Exit ↓ (1)	Enter/Exit ↓ (2-3)
B1	Ticket Hall ↓	Ticket Hall↓ (12 elevators)
B2	Underpass -2 ↓	↓
B3	Underpass -3 ↓	↓
B4	Underpass-4 ↓	↓
B5	Platform	Platform

Platform level	Westbound	← toward Mahmutbey (Kağıthane)
Platform level	Island platform, doors will open on the left
Platform level	Eastbound	toward Mecidiyeköy (terminus)

== Connections ==
Connection to IETT city buses is available from at street level. Çağlayan Metrobus Station is a metrobus station serving Metrobuses operated by IETT in Istanbul. It is located in the south of Istanbul Justice Palace. Çağlayan Metrobus station was opened on 8 September 2008. There is approximately 1 km walking distance between Çağlayan Metro and Metrobus stations.

== Operation information ==
As of 2021, total length of M7 line is 18 km. The line operates between 06.00 - 00.00 and travel frequency is 6 minutes at peak hour.

== Gallery ==
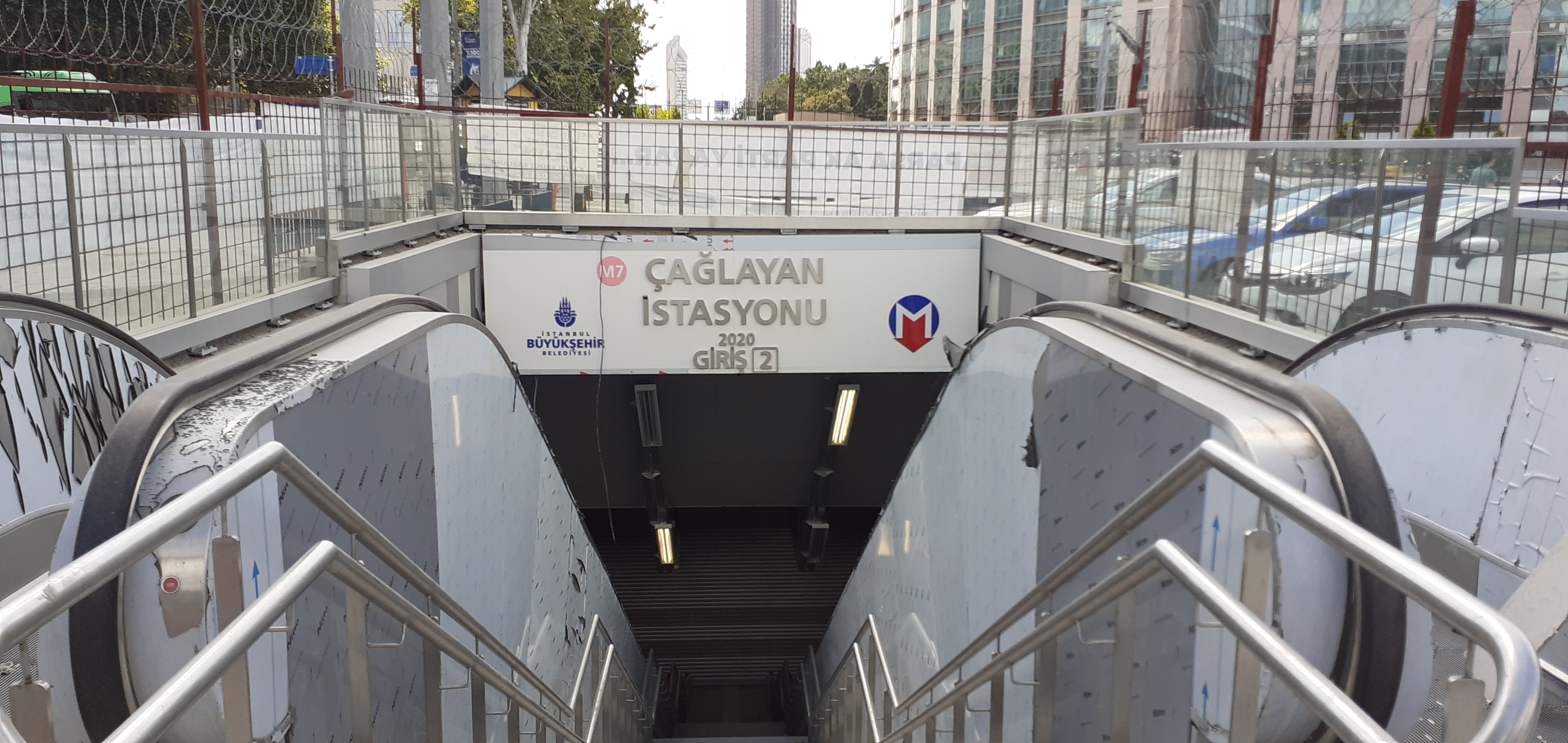
Çağlayan Metro Station: Entrance 2 (Construction)

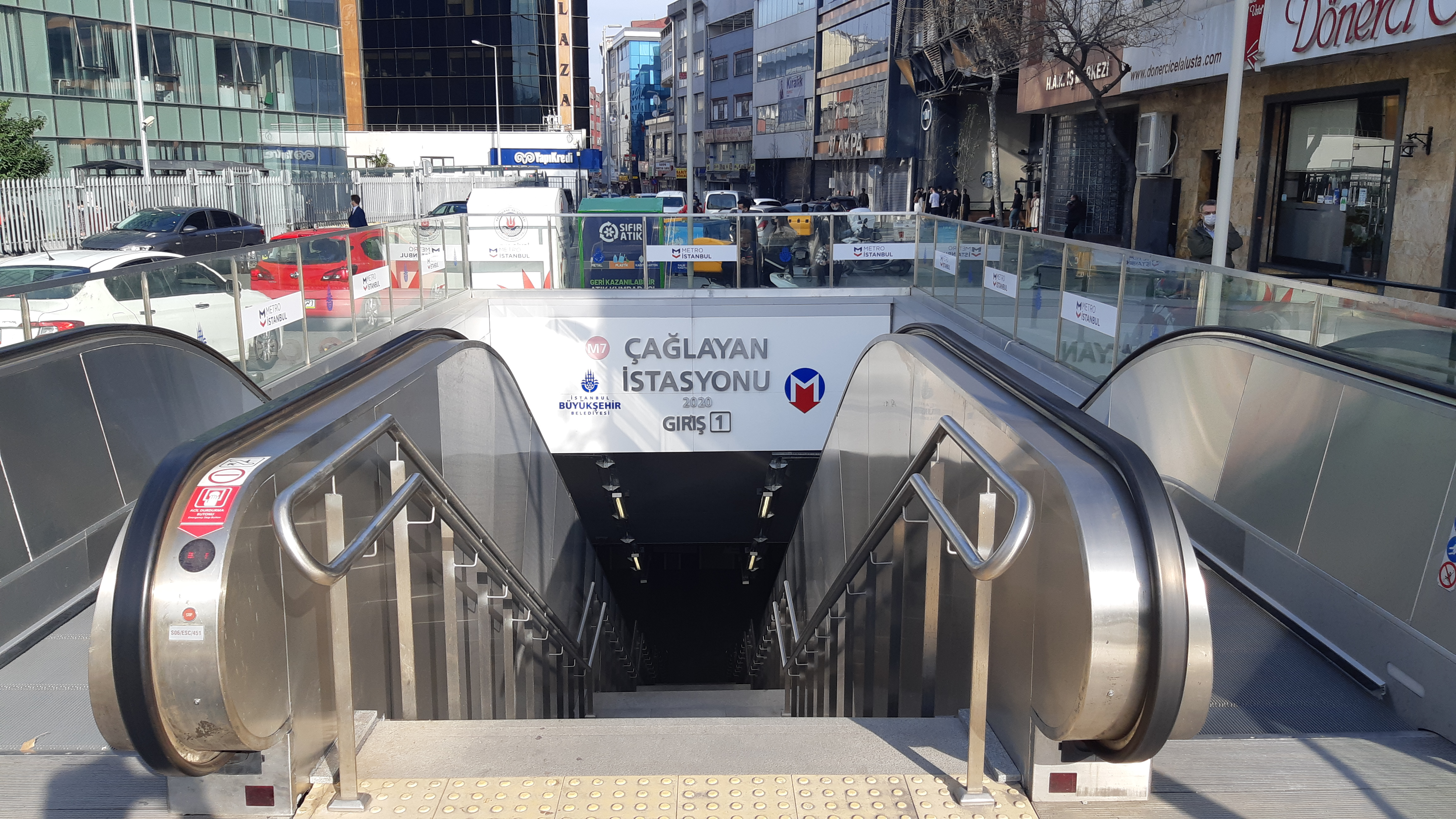
Çağlayan Metro Station: Entrance 1

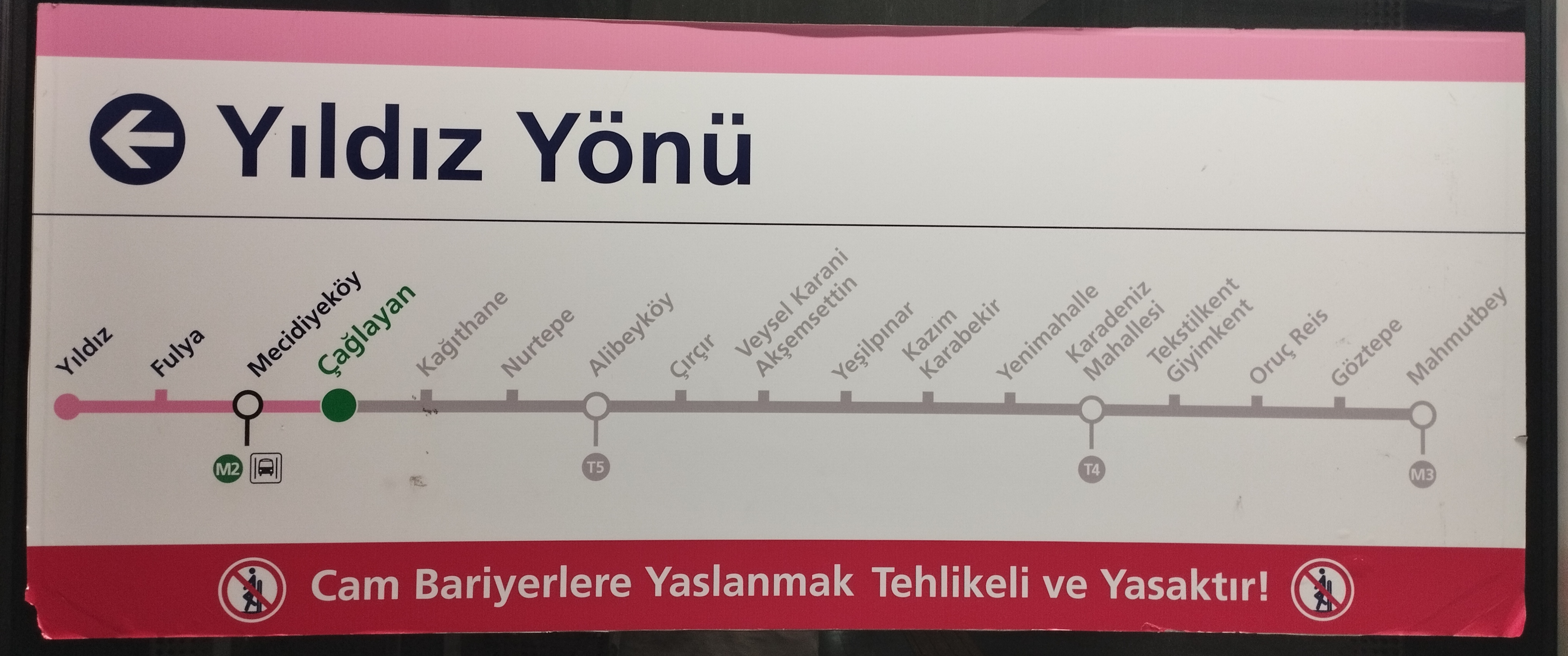
M7 line legant

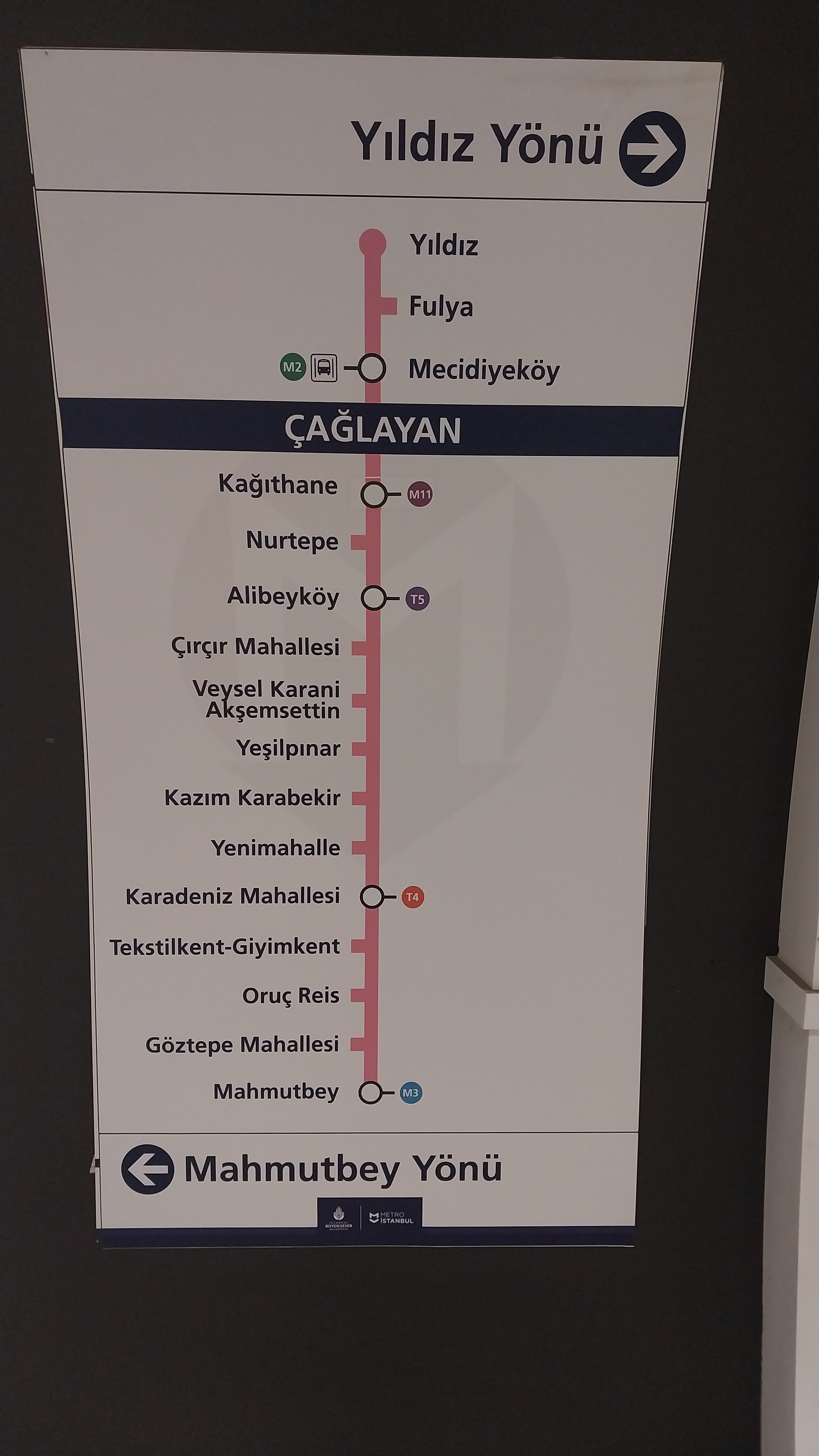
M7 line legant -2-

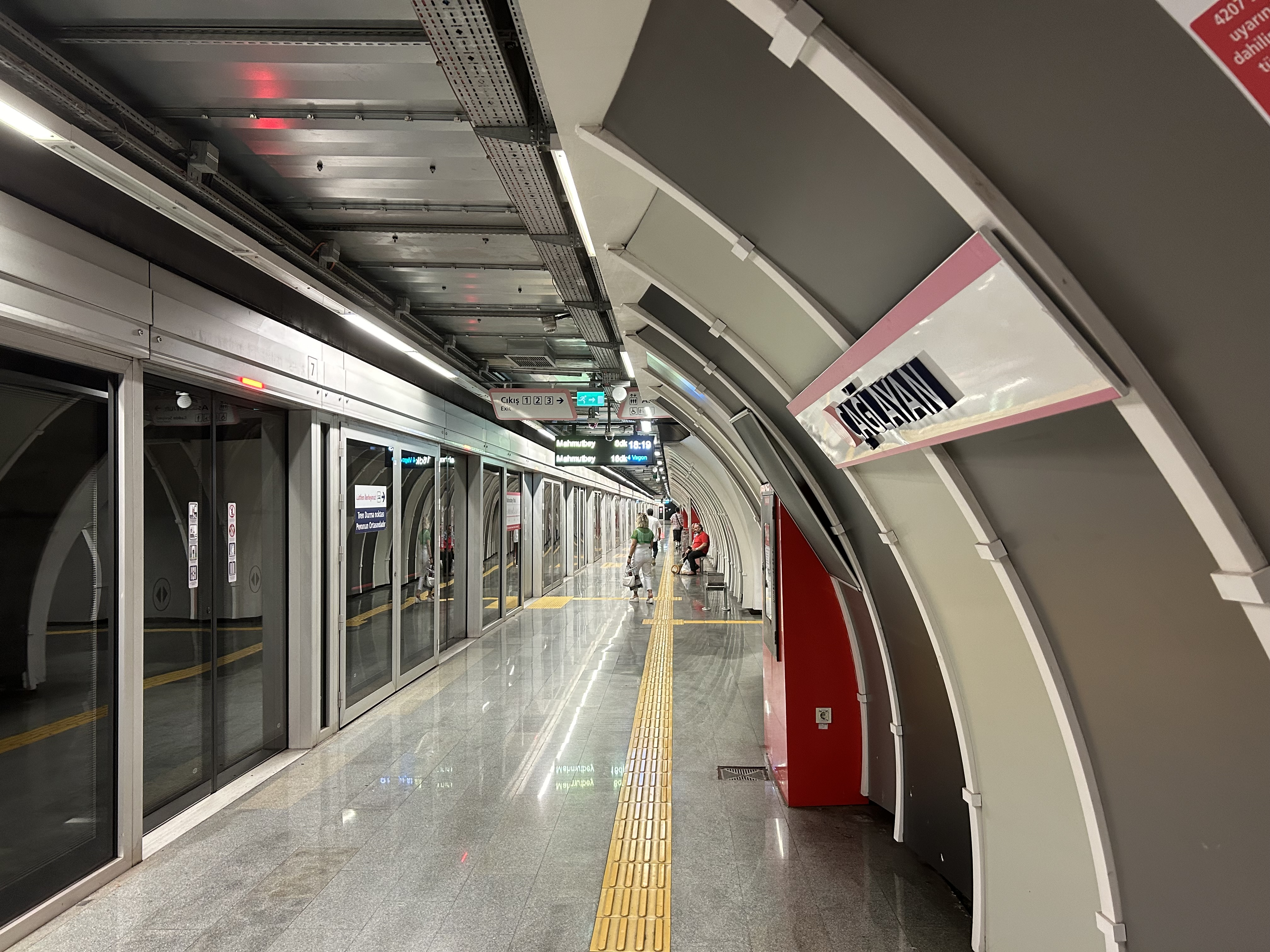
M7 Çağlayan Station

== See also ==
- Istanbul Justice Palace
- Çağlayan (Metrobus)
