= Osmanbey station =

Station of the Istanbul Metro

Osmanbey
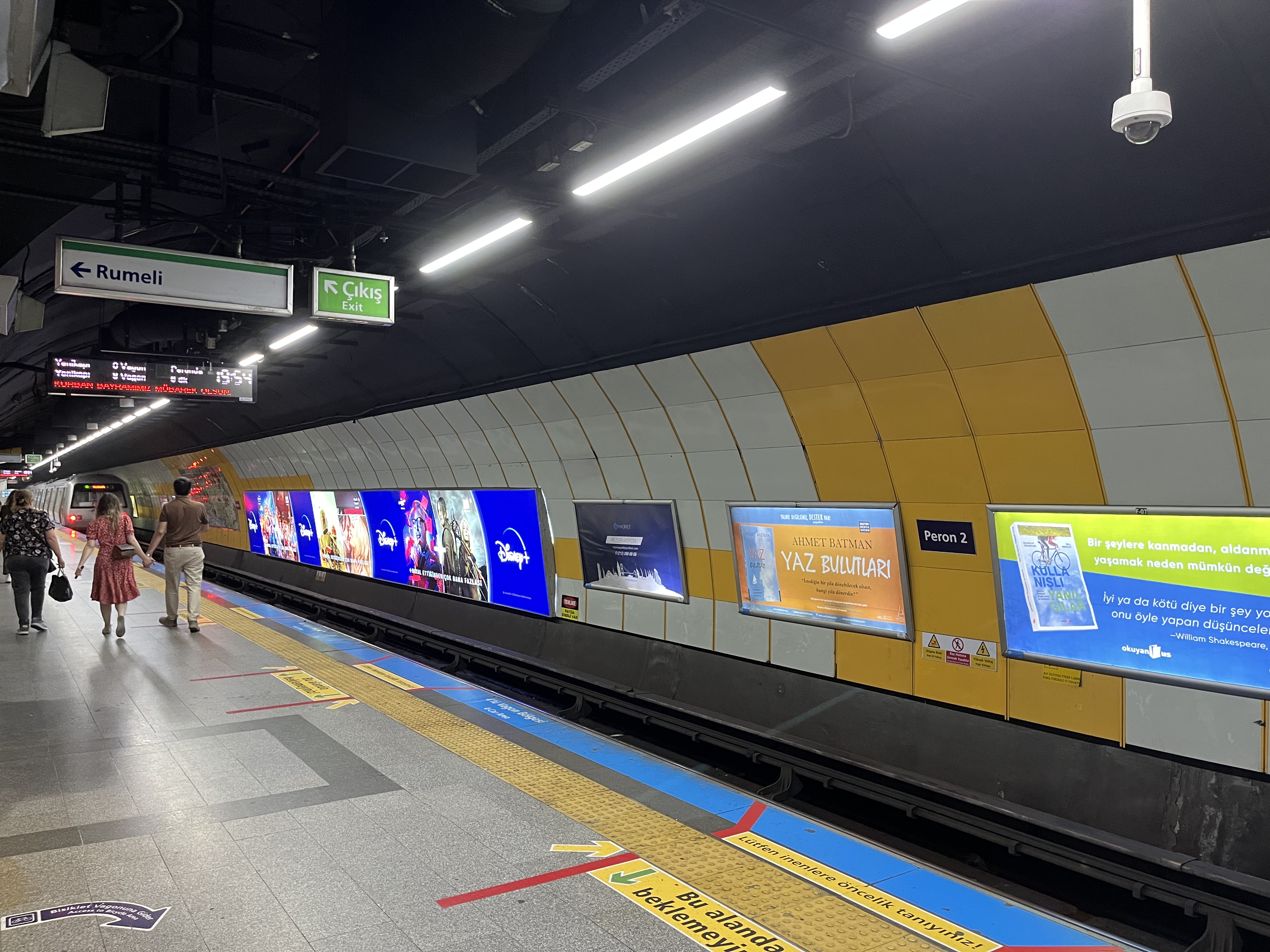

General information
- Location: Halaskargazi Cd., Cumhuriyet Mah. 34380; Şişli, Istanbul
- Coordinates: 41.0538°N 28.9872°E
- System: Istanbul Metro rapid transit station
- Owner: Istanbul Metropolitan Municipality
- Operator: Metro Istanbul
- Line: M2
- Platforms: 1 Island platform
- Tracks: 2
- Connections: İETT Bus: 25G, 30A, 30M, 46Ç, 46E, 46H, 46KT, 46T, 48N, 54Ç, 54E, 54K, 54ÖR, 54T, 66, 69A, 70D, 70FE, 70FY, 70KE, 70KY, 74, 74A, 202, 256, DT1, DT2

Construction
- Structure type: Underground
- Accessible: Yes

History
- Opened: 16 September 2000
- Electrified: 750V DC Third rail

Services
Preceding station	Istanbul Metro	Following station
Taksim towards Yenikapı	M2 Line	Şişli–Mecidiyeköy towards Hacıosman
Location

Osmanbey is an underground rapid transit station on the M2 line of the Istanbul Metro. It is located in south-central Şişli under Halaskargazi Avenue. Osmanbey was opened on 16 September 2000 and is one of the six original stations on the M2 line. It has an island platform serviced by two tracks.

== Layout ==
Southbound	← toward Yenikapı
Island platform
Northbound	toward Hacıosman →
