= M7 (Istanbul Metro) =

Metro line in Istanbul, Turkey

M7 Yıldız–Mahmutbey
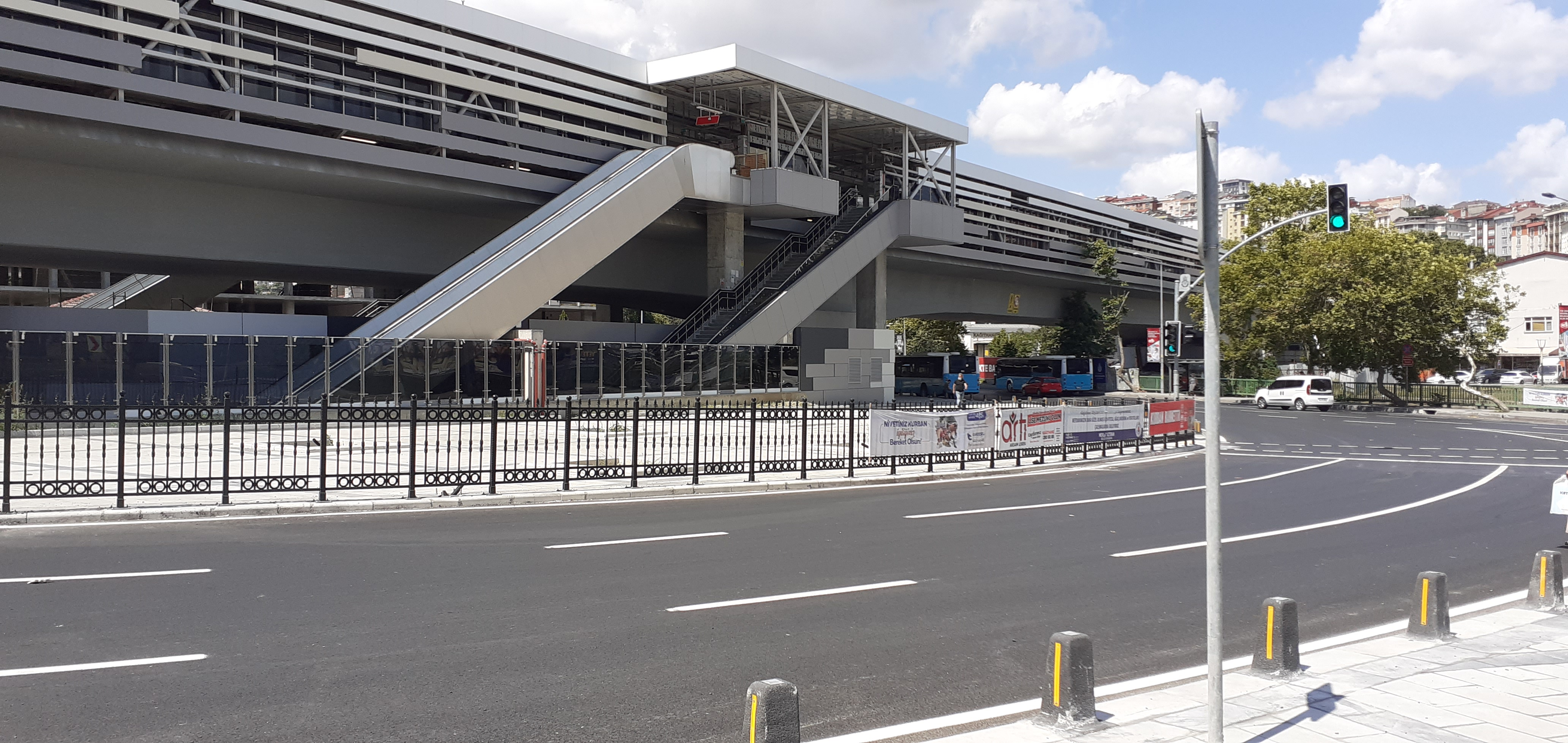
- Kağıthane Station

Overview
- Status: Operational; Mecidiyeköy - Mahmutbey; Mecidiyeköy - Yıldız (As Shuttle); Under Construction; Kabataş - Yıldız; Mahmutbey - Hastane; Projected; Hastane - Esenyurt Meydanı; Planned; Esenyurt Meydanı - Saadetdere
- Owner: Istanbul Metropolitan Municipality
- Line number: M7
- Locale: Istanbul, Turkey
- Termini: Yıldız; Mahmutbey
- Stations: 17

Service
- Type: Rapid transit
- System: Istanbul Metro
- Services: 1
- Operator: Metro Istanbul A.Ş.
- Depot: Tekstilkent
- Rolling stock: 80 Hyundai Rotem; 4 carriages per trainset

History
- Opened: 28 October 2020 (5 years ago)
- Last extension: 2 January 2023 (3 years ago)

Technical
- Line length: 20 km (12 mi)
- Number of tracks: 2
- Track gauge: 1,435 mm (4 ft 8 1/2 in) standard gauge
- Electrification: 1,500 V DC Overhead line
- Operating speed: 80 km/h (50 mph)
- Signalling: CityFlo650, Bombardier Transportation

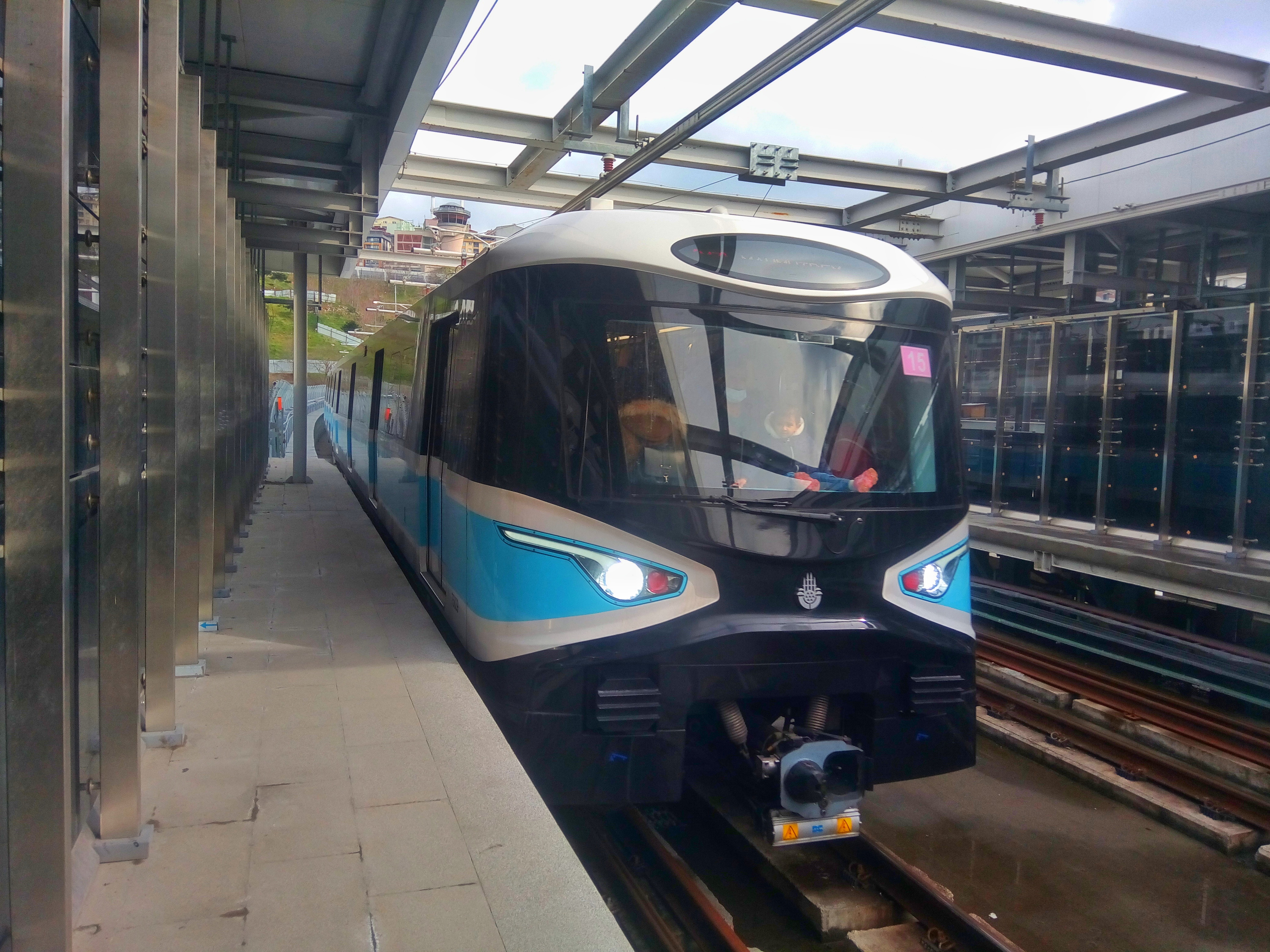
M7 train at Kağıthane

The M7, officially referred to as the M7 Yıldız–Mahmutbey metro line (Turkish: M7 Yıldız–Mahmutbey metro hattı) is a rapid transit line of the Istanbul Metro system on the European part of Istanbul, Turkey. It is colored light pink on the maps and route signs. It is the first driverless rapid transit line of the European side of Istanbul.

On 20 December 2013, the line was commissioned to Kalyon Group for construction. The groundbreaking ceremony was held on 9 February 2014. The line is 20 km (12 mi) long with 17 stations.

The line is divided into three phases. Currently, it is partly in service. The section between Mecidiyeköy and Mahmutbey was inaugurated on 28 October 2020. The Mecidiyeköy - Kabataş and Mahmutbey - Esenyurt Meydan phases are still under construction, and there is also a planned extension between the stations Esenyurt Meydan - Saadetdere.

When fully completed, the M7-line will be connecting twelve districts of the Istanbul metropolitan area, namely Beyoğlu, Beşiktaş, Şişli, Kağıthane, Eyüp, Gaziosmanpaşa, Esenler, Bağcılar, Küçükçekmece, Avcılar, Başakşehir and Esenyurt. It is projected that 300 cars of driverless metro trains will carry about one million passengers daily. The total travel time will be 31.5 minutes between the termini. The M7 line costs ₺ 3.7 billion (approx. US$1 billion).

On 2 January 2023, an extension of the line from Mecidiyeköy to Yıldız was opened. Unlike the rest of the line, this section is operated as a shuttle service, with trains running from the new terminus at Yıldız to Mecidiyeköy. With the opening of the Kabataş stage in 2028, shuttle operation on this section of the line will cease, and trains will run directly from Kabataş to points west.

Trains run on the Mecidiyeköy - Mahmutbey section every 6 minutes, and on the Yıldız - Mecidiyeköy section every 12 minutes.

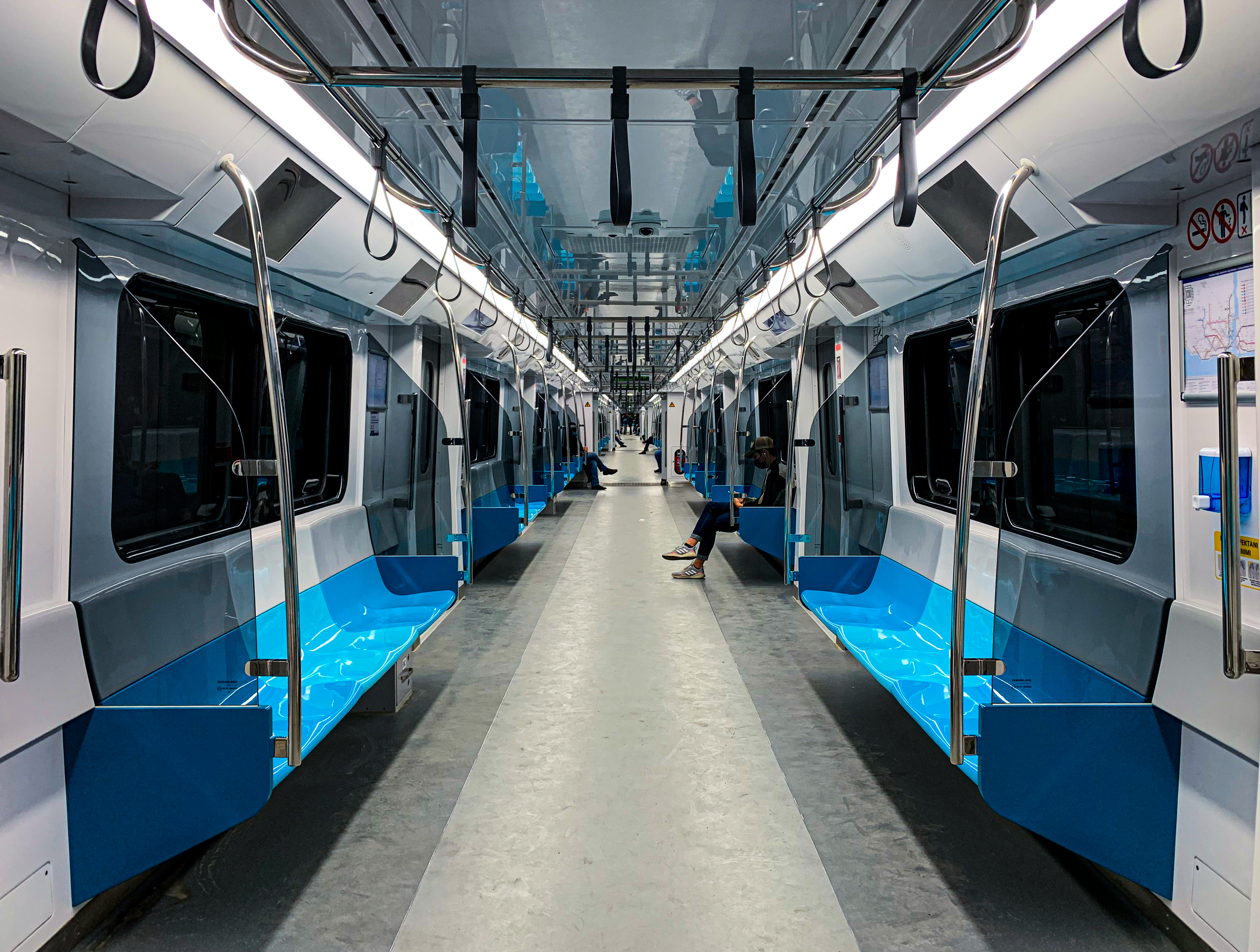
M7 train interior

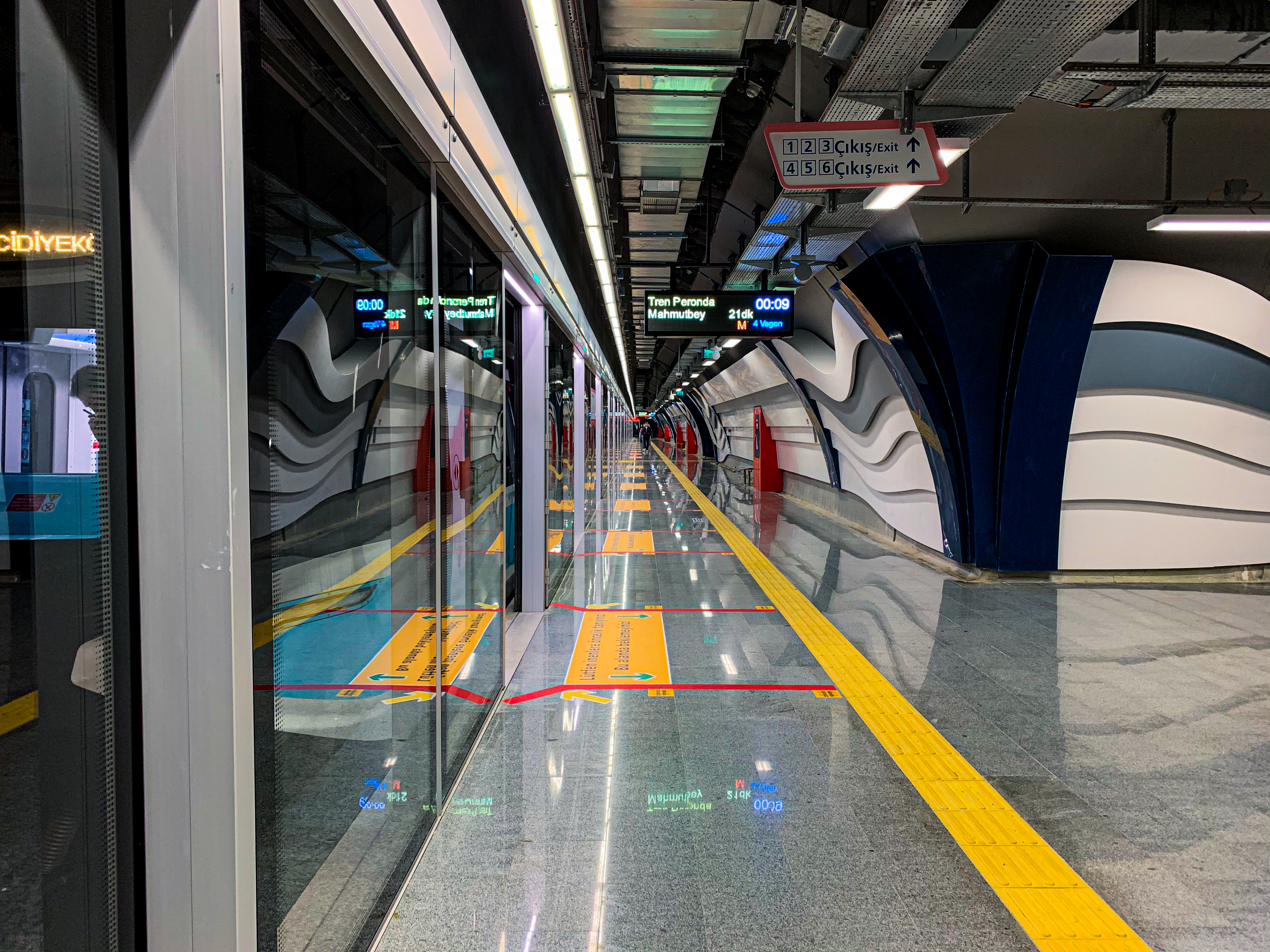
M7 Mecidiyeköy station on opening day

== Stations ==
M7 route diagram

No	Station	District	Transfer	Type	Notes
1	Kabataş	Beyoğlu	・ (Kabataş Transfer Center)・ (Kabataş Terminal)・Dentur Avrasya; İETT Bus: 22, 22B, 25E, 26, 26A, 26B, 27E, 27SE, 28, 28T, 29C, 29D, 30D, 41E, 43R, 58A, 58N, 58S, 58UL, 62, 63, 70KE	Underground	Dolmabahçe Palace・Mimar Sinan Fine Arts University・Beşiktaş Stadium
2	Beşiktaş	Beşiktaş	(Beşiktaş Terminal)・(Beşiktaş and Barbaros Hayrettin Paşa Piers)・Turyol・Dentur Avrasya; İETT Bus: 22, 22RE, 25E, 26, 26A, 26B, 27E, 27SE, 28, 28T, 29A, 29C, 29D, 29E, 30A, 30D, 30M, 36G, 36L, 40B, 40T, 41E, 42T, 43R, 50L, 55ET, 55G, 57UL, 58A, 58N, 58S, 58UL, 62, 62G, 63, 129T, 559C, DT1, DT2, U1, U2	Underground	Beşiktaş Square・Great Beşiktaş Bazaar・Beşiktaş Cultural Center・Bahçeşehir University
↑↑ Under Construction (planned to open in 2028) ↑↑
3	Yıldız	Beşiktaş	Ortaköy–Yıldız Funicular Line (Planned); İETT Bus: 27E, 27SE, 29A, 29C, 29D, 29E, 30A, 30M, 36G, 36L, 40B, 41E, 43R, 58A, 58N, 58S, 58UL, 62, 62G, 63, 129T, 559C, U1, U2	Underground	Yıldız Technical University Yıldız Campus・Yıldız Mosque・Sait Çiftçi State Hospital・Barbaros Boulevard
4	Fulya	Beşiktaş	İETT Bus: 26B, 43	Underground	Turkish State Mint
↑↑ In shuttle operation (until opening of the Kabataş stage in 2028) ↑↑
5	Mecidiyeköy	Şişli	(Şişli–Mecidiyeköy)・ (Mecidiyeköy); İETT Bus: 25G, 27T, 29Ş, 30A, 30M, 32M, 33M, 33TM, 41AT, 46Ç, 46KT, 46T, 48, 48H, 48N, 48S, 50C, 50M, 50S, 54Ç, 54E, 54HŞ, 54K, 54ÖR, 54P, 54T, 55, 59A, 59B, 59CH, 59K, 59N, 59R, 59UÇ, 64Ç, 65G, 66, 66Z, 74, 74A, 77, 77A, 79KM, 92M, 92Ş, 93M, 97M, 121A, 121B, 121BS, 122C, 122D, 122Y, 141A, 141M, 146M, 251, 252, 336M, 522, 522ST, 622, DT1, DT2, E-58, H-2, HM3, HM4, K4	Underground	Büyükdere ave・Cevahir Shopping Mall・Profilo Shopping Mall・Trump Towers・Mecidiyeköy Square
6	Çağlayan	Kâğıthane	İETT Bus: 46Ç, 46KT, 46T, 48, 48H, 48N, 48S, 50C, 65A, 77A, HM3, K4	Underground	Istanbul Justice Palace・Hürriyet neighbourhood・Florence Nightingale Hospital
7	Kağıthane	Kâğıthane	・ (Planned); İETT Bus: 41ST, 46Ç, 46T, 48, 48H, 48N, 48T, 50D, 62, 63, 64Ç, 65A, 65G, K1, K2, K3, K4, TM3	Viaduct	Kâğıthane Creek・Kağıthane Sadabad Theater・Cendere Ave
8	Nurtepe	Kâğıthane	İETT Bus: 48N, 62G, 62H, TM1, TM2	Underground	Güzeltepe・İSKİ・AKOM
9	Alibeyköy	Eyüpsultan	İETT Bus: 50A, 50AT, 50B, 50C, 50D, 50E, 50F, 50G, 50H, 50K, 50L, 50M, 50N, 50R, 50S, 50T, 50V, 50Y, 50Z, TM1, TM2, TM3, TM4, TM5, TM6, TM7, TM8, TM9, TM10, TM11, TM12, TM13, TM14, TM15, TM16, TM17, TM18, TM19	Viaduct	Alibeyköy Creek
10	Çırçır	Eyüpsultan	İETT Bus: 50P, TM7	Underground	İBB Tevfik Aydeniz Sports Facilities
11	Veysel Karani–Akşemsettin	Eyüpsultan	İETT Bus: 50AT, TM7, TM8, TM9, TM10, TM11, TM12, TM18	Underground	Eyüp Park Shopping Mall・İsfanbul Theme Park
12	Yeşilpınar	Eyüpsultan	İETT Bus: 50AT, TM9, TM10, TM11, TM18	Underground	İBB Erdem Beyazıt Library
13	Kâzım Karabekir	Gaziosmanpaşa	İETT Bus: 36L, 38B, 38Z, 50AT, 88, 88A, HT5, MK49, MK53, TM9, TM18	Underground	
14	Yenimahalle	Gaziosmanpaşa	İETT Bus: 36, 36ES, 38, 38E, 38KE, HT5, TM9, TM14, TM16	Underground	Gaziosmanpaşa Training & Research Hospital
15	Karadeniz Mahallesi	Gaziosmanpaşa	(Kiptaş–Venezia station); İETT Bus: 36V, 336E	Underground	Venezia Mega Outlet・Metris
16	Giyimkent–Tekstilkent	Esenler	İETT Bus: 33, 33B, 33ES, 33M, 33TE, 33TM, 33Y, 98G, 98Y, HT11, MK53	Underground	Depot・Giyimkent・Tekstilkent
17	Oruç Reis	Esenler	İETT Bus: 33Y, 98Y, HT11	Underground	
18	Göztepe Mahallesi	Bağcılar	İETT Bus: 31Y, 76A, 76O, 78, 78FB, 78H, 89C, 89T, 91E, 97GE, 97M, 141A, 141M, 146A, 146B, 146K, 146M, 146T, 303B, HT11, MK92	Underground	Medipol University Hospital
19	Mahmutbey	Bağcılar	İETT Bus: 141K, 141M, 144M, 89C, 89T, 91E, 97E, 97GE, 97M, 98A, 98M, H-1, HT10	Underground	
↓↓ Under Construction (inauguration planned in 2028) ↓↓
20	Bölge Parkı	Bağcılar		Underground	
21	Atatürk Mahallesi	Küçükçekmece	İETT Bus: 36AY, 76O, 78ZB, 79FY, 79K, 89C, 89F, 89M, 98, 98H, 98KM, 98MB, 141A, 141K, 141M, 143, H-3, HS3, MK19, MK31	Underground	
22	Toplu Konutlar	Küçükçekmece	İETT Bus: 89, 89YB, 98AB, 98T, 141A, 143, MR40	Underground	ArenaPark Shopping Mall
23	Atakent Mahallesi	Küçükçekmece	(Halkalı Stadı); İETT Bus: 89, 89YB, 98T, 141K, 141M, MR40	Underground	Halkalı Stadium
24	Hastane	Küçükçekmece	İETT Bus: 36AS, 78G, 78Ş, 76V, 89A, 89K, 89T, 98S, 141A, 141K, 141M, 142B, 142T, HT1, KÇ2, MK16, MK31, MR40, MR50, MR51, MR54	Underground	Kanuni Sultan Süleyman Training & Research Hospital
↓↓ Planned (inauguration planned after 2030) ↓↓
25	Tahtakale	Avcılar	İETT Bus: 147	Underground	
26	Ispartakule	Avcılar	İETT Bus: 76A, 76V, 142B, 142E, 142T, 144M, 146A, 146F, 146T, 147, E-56, E-57, E-58, E-59, HS2, MK14, MK15, MR51, MR54	Underground	
27	Bahçeşehir	Başakşehir	İETT Bus: 76D, 142, 142B, 144K, 144M, 146, 146A, 146F, 146T, 147, E-57, E-58, E-59, MK15, MR51	Underground	
28	Esenkent M7	Esenyurt	İETT Bus: 76D, 142, 142A, 142ES, 144A, 144K, 146, 146A, 146F, E-57, E-58, E-59	Underground	Akbatı Mall・İstinye University Hospital
29	Ardıçlı	Esenyurt	İETT Bus: 76D, 142, 142A, 142ES, 142B, 142E, 144A, 146, 147, ES4	Underground	
30	Esenyurt Meydanı	Esenyurt	İETT Bus: 76D, 142, 142A, 142B, 142E, 142ES, 142T, 144A, 146, 147, ES1, HS2	Underground	Esenyurt Square
↓↓ Proposed ↓↓
31	Nazım Hikmet	Esenyurt	(Planned); İETT Bus: 76D, 142, 142E, 144A, 146, 147, ES1, HS2	Underground	
32	Esenyurt Belediye	Esenyurt	İETT Bus: 76D, 142, 142E, 144A, 146, 147, ES1, HS2	Underground	Esenyurt Municipality
33	Firuzköy	Esenyurt	İETT Bus: 76D, 142, 142A, 142ES, 142F, 142K, 144A, 146, 147	Underground	
34	Saadetdere	Avcılar	(Planned)・ İETT Bus: 76, 76BA, 76C, 76G, 145, 303A, 401, 429A, 458, BM4, HT29, HT48	Underground	Saadetdere Metrobus Station

== M7 Mecidiyeköy - Mahmutbey section ==
Şişli/Mecidiyeköy - Mahmutbey section opened on 28 October 2020, the Şişli/Meciyeköy - Mahmutbey section of the M7-line serves 15 metro stations across six districts of the Istanbul City. The line is 18 km (11 mi) long. The combined length of the entire metro system in Istanbul has thus reached 172.25 km (107.03 mi). The line is the second in automatic train operation (ATO) of Istanbul after the M5 Üsküdar–Sultanbeyli line, and the first ATO line on the European side of the city. All stations have platform screen doors, opening only when the train is stopped at the platform.

== See also ==
- Public transport in Istanbul
- Istanbul Metro
- Istanbul Metropolitan Municipality
- Metro İstanbul A.Ş.
- Istanbul modern tramways
- Istanbul nostalgic tramways
