= Fulya station =

Metro station in Istanbul, Turkey

Fulya
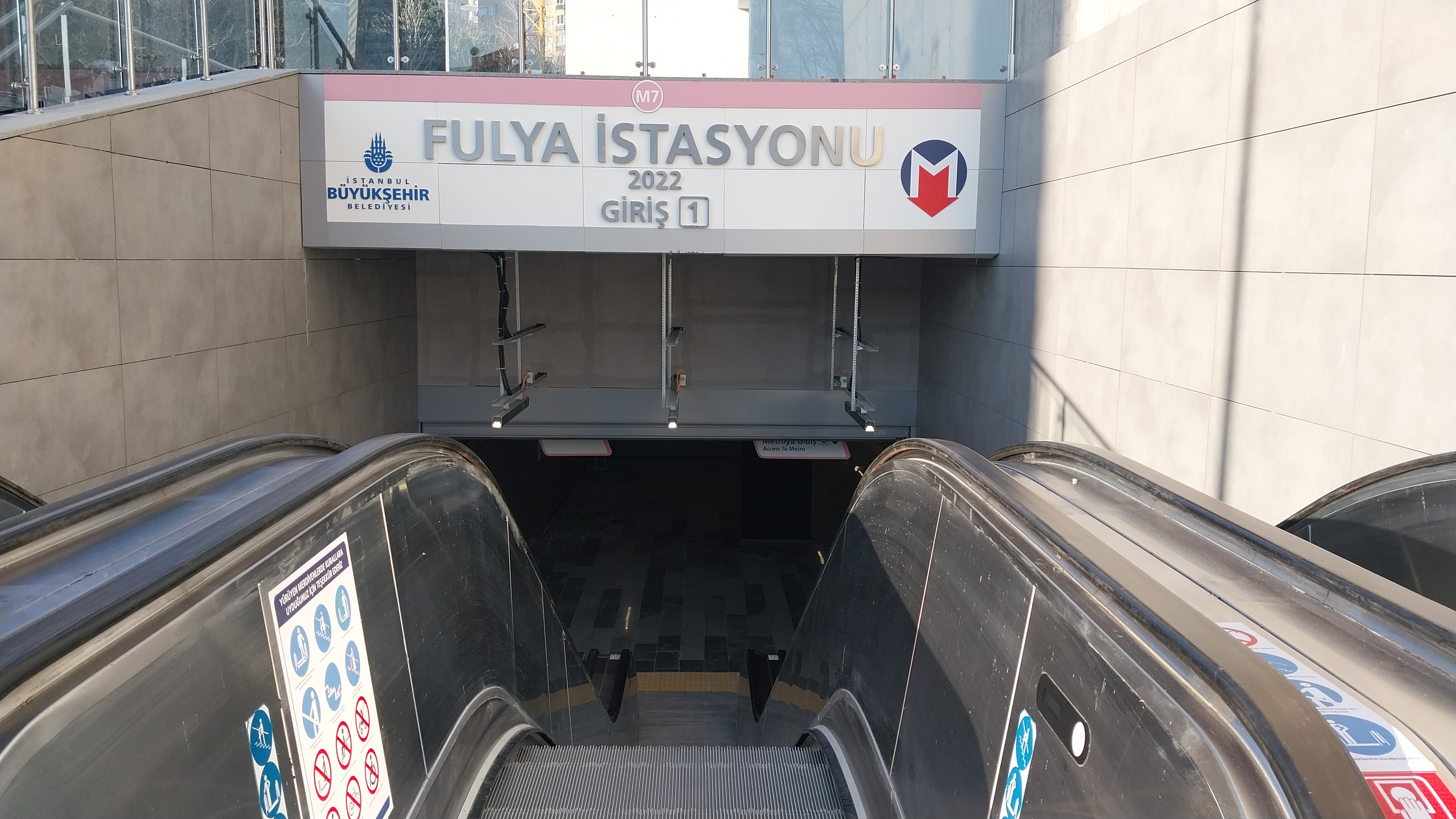
- Entrance 1 of the station

General information
- Location: Gayrettepe Neighborhood, Gönenoğlu Street, 34339; Beşiktaş, Istanbul
- Coordinates: 41.0616864°N 29.0073405°E
- System: Istanbul Metro rapid transit station
- Owner: Istanbul Metropolitan Municipality
- Operator: Metro Istanbul
- Line: M7
- Platforms: 1 island platform
- Tracks: 2
- Connections: İETT Bus 26B, 74A

Construction
- Structure type: Underground
- Accessible: Yes

History
- Opened: 2 January 2023
- Electrified: 1,500 V DC Overhead line

Services
Preceding station	Istanbul Metro	Following station
Şişli—Mecidiyeköy Terminus	M7 Line Yıldız Shuttle	Yıldız Terminus
Location

Fulya is an underground station on the M7 line of the Istanbul Metro in Beşiktaş. The station is located on Gönenoğlu Street in the Gayrettepe neighborhood of Beşiktaş. Unlike the name suggests, it is not located in or nearby the Fulya neighborhood of Şişli.

The station has two entrances; Gayrettepe and Dikilitaş.

The M7 line operates as fully automatic unattended train operation (UTO). The station consists of an island platform with two tracks. Since the M7 is an ATO line, protective gates on each side of the platform open only when a train is in the station. However, until the line is extended to Kabataş the trains will only use the first platform with the second platform remaining closed.

The station opened on 2 January 2023 as the first phase of the Mecidiyeköy-Kabataş extension.

== Surroundings ==
The station serves the Gayrettepe and the Dikilitaş neighborhoods, the Istanbul Mint and the Gayrettepe Florence Nightingale Hospital.

== Services ==
As of November 2023, the M7 line is 20 kilometers long and has a service frequency of 10 trains per hour in each direction. The line runs 24/7 on weekends and state holidays and from 6 am to midnight on weekdays.
