= Şişli–Mecidiyeköy station =

Station of the Istanbul Metro

Şişli—Mecidiyeköy (M2) Mecidiyeköy (M7)
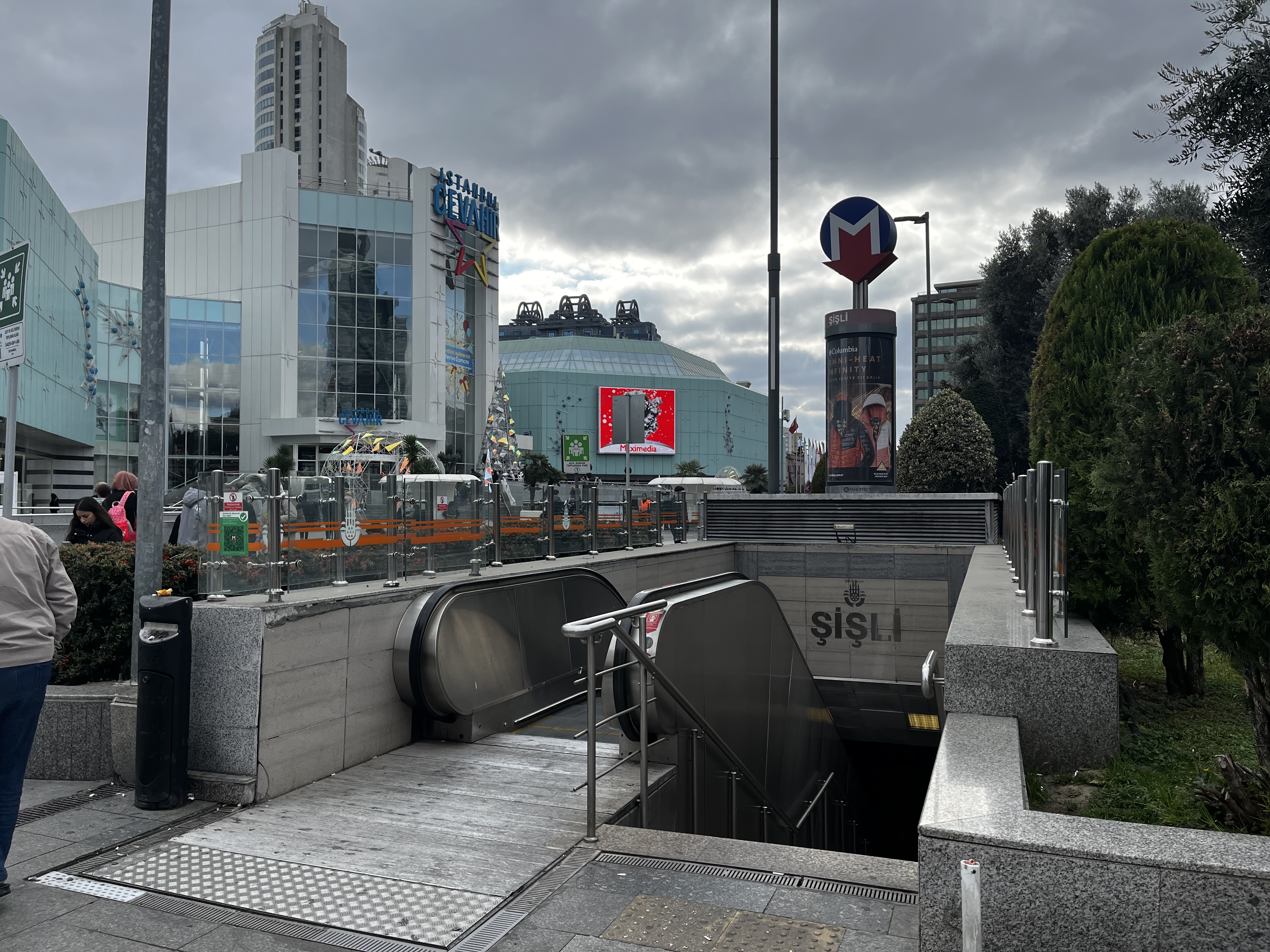

General information
- Location: Büyükdere Cd., Merkez Mah. 34381; Şişli, Istanbul
- Coordinates: 41.0647°N 28.9929°E
- System: Istanbul Metro rapid transit station
- Owner: Istanbul Metropolitan Municipality
- Operator: Metro Istanbul
- Lines: M2; M7
- Platforms: 2 Island platforms
- Tracks: 4
- Connections: Metrobus: 34, 34A, 34G, 34AS, 34BZ at Mecidiyeköy; İETT Bus: 25G, 27T, 29Ş, 30A, 30M, 32M, 33M, 33TM, 36M, 41AT, 46Ç, 46KT, 46T, 48, 48H, 48N, 48S, 50C, 50M, 50S, 54Ç, 54E, 54HŞ, 54K, 54ÖR, 54P, 54T, 55, 59A, 59B, 59CH, 59K, 59N, 59R, 59S, 59UÇ, 64Ç, 65G, 66, 66Z, 74, 74A, 77, 77A, 79KM, 92M, 92Ş, 93M, 97M, 121A, 121B, 121BS, 122B, 122C, 122D, 122M, 122Y, 141M, 146M, 251, 252, 256, 336M, 522, 522ST, 622, DT1, DT2, E-58, H2, HM3, HM4, K4; Istanbul Minibus: Şişhane-Şişli, Şişli-Başak Konutları, Şişli-Göktürk, Şişli-Güzeltepe, Şişli-İmar Blokları, Şişli-Vialand, Şişli-Yahya Kemal, Şişli-Yunus Emre Mah., Şişli-Zincirdere

Construction
- Structure type: Underground
- Parking: No
- Cycle facilities: Yes
- Accessible: Yes

Other information
- Status: M2 Operating; M7 Operating; Metrobus Operating

History
- Opened: 16 September 2000
- Electrified: 750V DC Third rail(M2)

Services
Preceding station	Istanbul Metro	Following station
Osmanbey towards Yenikapı	M2 Line	Gayrettepe towards Hacıosman
Çağlayan towards Mahmutbey	M7 Line	Fulya towards Yıldız
Future service
Çağlayan towards Mahmutbey	M7 Line	Fulya towards Kabataş
Location

Şişli - Mecidiyeköy Metro Station (M2) is an underground metro station on the M2 line of the Istanbul metro and put into service on September 16, 2000.

The station is on Büyükdere Caddesi in Şişli's 19 Mayıs District.

The station has 6 entrances, namely Şişli, Fulya, Mecidiyeköy, Trump Towers AVM, Ortaklar Caddesi and Cevahir AVM.

Mecidiyeköy Metro Station (M7) is an underground metro station on the M7 line of the Istanbul metro and opened on October 28, 2020.

The station is located on Büyükdere Street in Şişli's Merkez and Fulya neighborhoods. The station is located on the lower level of the M2 platform.

M7 Metro Station is in the west corridor; Entrance number 1 is Mecidiyeköy Square, entrance number 2 is Metrobus / Bus Stops, entrance number 3 is Büyükdere Caddesi and entrance number 4 is Ortaklar Caddesi / M2 mecidiyeköy Metro Connection, entrance no 5 is Garage Street, entrance 6 is fire station.

Mecidiyeköy Metrobus Station is the metrobus stop serving the Metrobuses operated by IETT in Istanbul. The station is located in the Mecidiyeköy district of Şişli, on the D-100 Highway.

The station entered service on September 8, 2008.

In Mecidiyeköy, 3 lines are connected to each other with an underpass.

== M2 Platform ==
Layout

Southbound	← toward Yenikapı (Osmanbey)
Island platform, doors will open on the left
Northbound	toward Hacıosman (Gayrettepe) →

== M7 Platform ==
Layout

Westbound	← toward Mahmutbey (Çağlayan)
Island platform, doors will open on the left
Eastbound	→ toward (Yıldız - Fulya Shuttle) (Fulya) (Kabataş Under Construction)
