= Yıldız station =

Metro station in Istanbul, Turkey

Yıldız
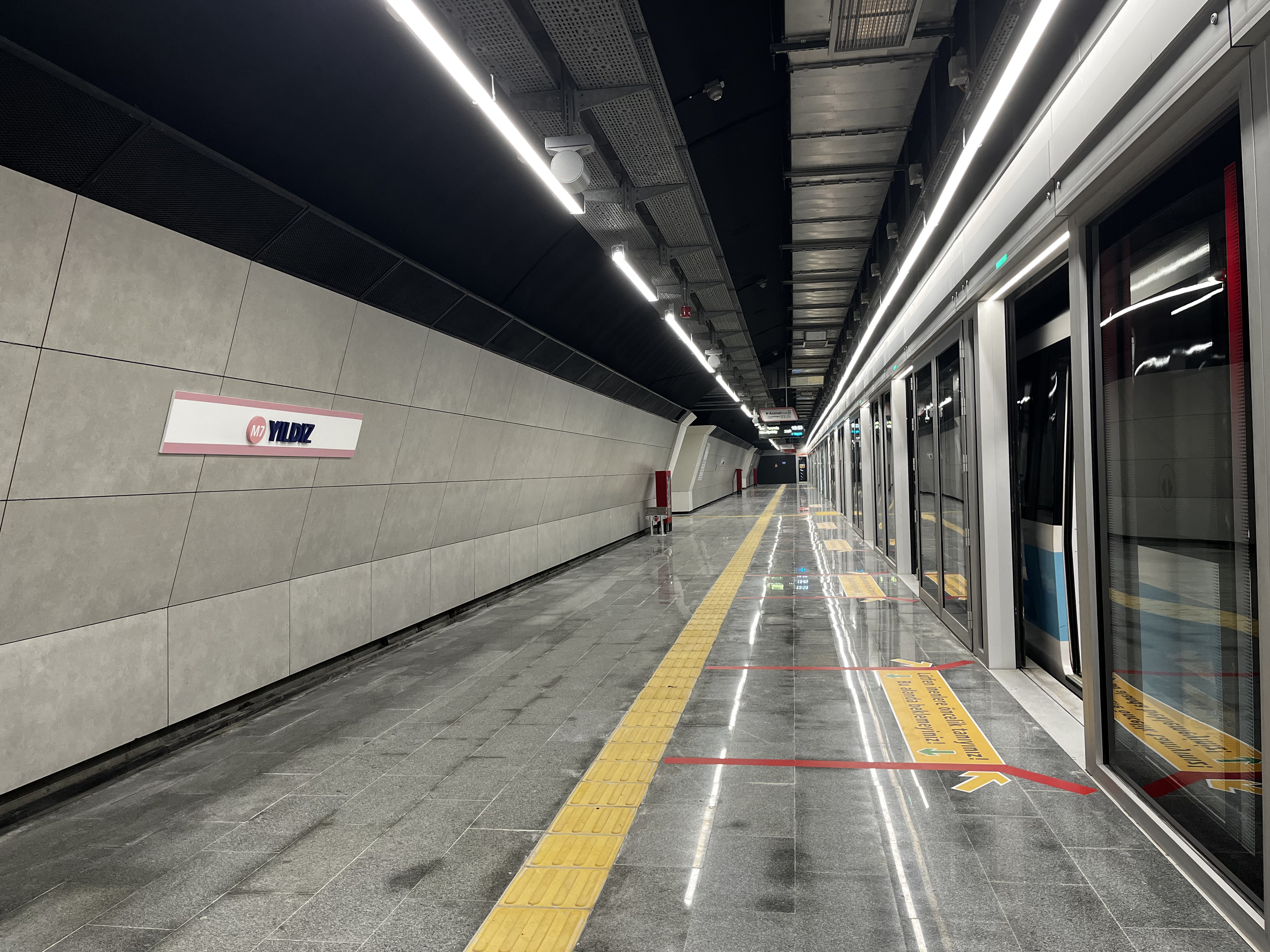

General information
- Location: Yıldız Neighborhood, Barbaros Boulevard, 34349; Beşiktaş, Istanbul
- Coordinates: 41.0542810°N 29.0097716°E
- System: Istanbul Metro rapid transit station
- Owner: Istanbul Metropolitan Municipality
- Operator: Metro Istanbul
- Line: M7
- Platforms: 1 island platform
- Tracks: 2
- Connections: İETT Bus: 27E, 27SE, 29A, 29C, 29D, 29E, 30A, 36G, 36L, 36Z, 40B, 41E, 43R, 58A, 58N, 58S, 58UL, 62, 62G, 62H, 129T, 399B, D31, D36, D62, TM1, TM2, U2; Istanbul Minibus Başak Konutları-Beşiktaş, Tarabya-Beşiktaş, Eski Kilyos Yolu-Beşiktaş, Yahya Kemal-Beşiktaş

Construction
- Structure type: Underground
- Accessible: Yes

History
- Opened: 2 January 2023
- Electrified: 1,500 V DC Overhead line

Services
Preceding station	Istanbul Metro	Following station
Fulya towards Mahmutbey	M7 Line	Terminus
Location

Yıldız is an underground station on the M7 line of the Istanbul Metro in Beşiktaş. The station is located on Barbaros Boulevard in the Yıldız neighborhood of Beşiktaş. With a depth of 71 meters, it is the second deepest station in the Istanbul Metro system, after the M11's Gayrettepe station.

The station has 3 entrances; Ertuğrul Sitesi, Yıldız University and Dikilitaş.

The M7 line operates as a fully automatic, unattended train operation (UTO). The station consists of an island platform with two tracks. Since the M7 is an ATO line, protective gates on each side of the platform open only when a train is in the station.

The station opened on 2 January, 2023 as the first phase of the Mecidiyeköy-Kabataş extension.

== Surroundings ==
The station serves the Yıldız, Balmumcu and Dikilitaş neighborhoods, the Yıldız Technical University, the Yıldız Park and the Sait Çiftçi State Hospital.

== Services ==
As of November 2023, the M7 line is 20 kilometers long and has a service frequency of 10 trains per hour in each direction. The line runs 24/7 on weekends and state holidays and from 6 am to midnight on weekdays.
