= Istanbul Metro =

Istanbul railway network

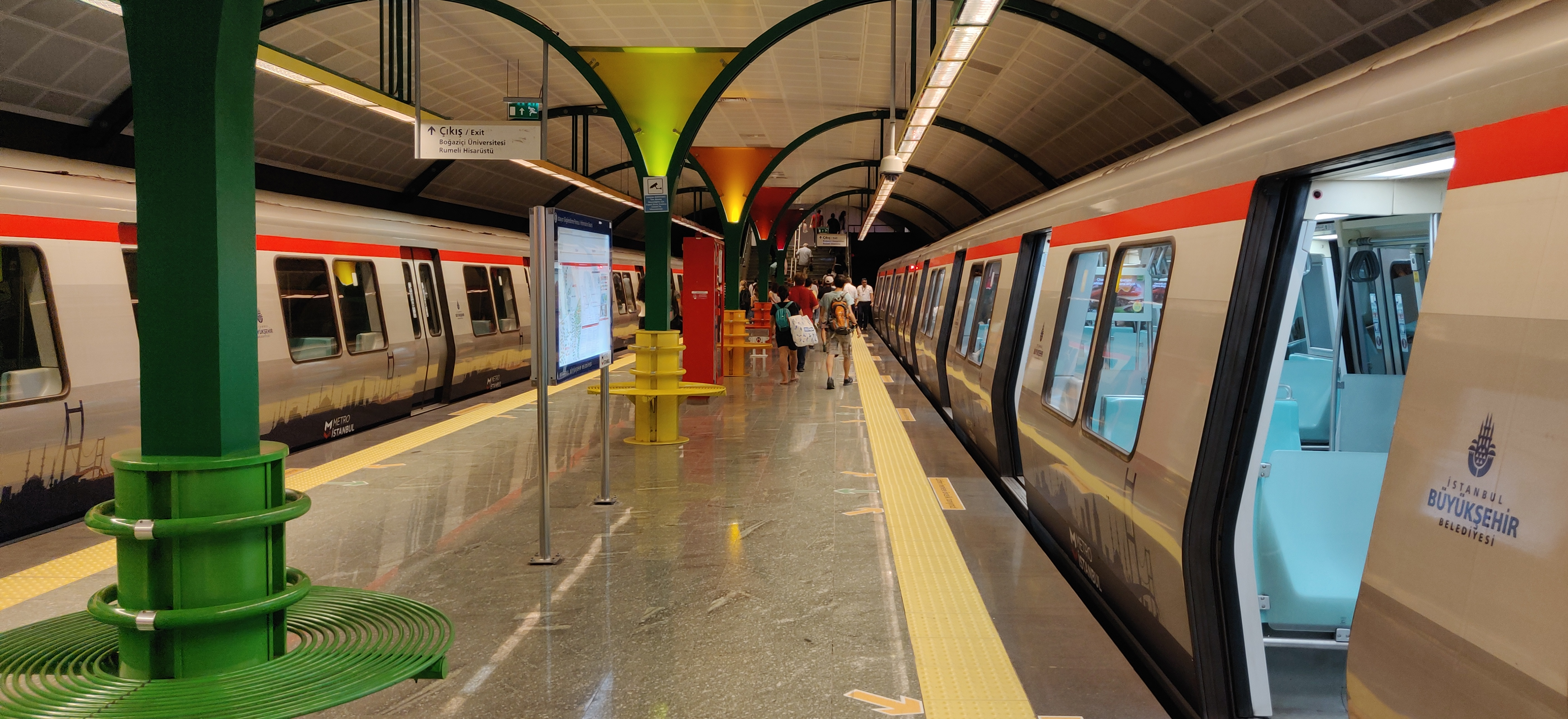
- Two trains waiting at Boğaziçi Üniversitesi on the M6 line

Overview
- Native name: İstanbul Metrosu
- Owner: Istanbul Metropolitan Municipality; Ministry of Transport and Infrastructure (Selected stations on the M3 and M4 line and M11 line only)
- Locale: Istanbul, Turkey
- Transit type: Rapid transit
- Number of lines: 11 (4 more under construction)
- Number of stations: 169; 27 under construction; 1 reserved; 15 on hold
- Daily ridership: 1.36 million
- Annual ridership: 612.912 million (2023) without M11
- Website: metro.istanbul

Operation
- Began operation: 3 September 1989; 37 years ago
- Operators: TCDD Taşımacılık (M11 line only)
- Number of vehicles: 727

Technical
- System length: 265.2 km (164.8 mi)
- Track gauge: 1,435 mm (4 ft 8 1/2 in) standard gauge
- Electrification: 750 V DC overhead line (M1/M5); 750 V DC third rail (M2/M6); 1,500 V DC overhead line (all other lines)
System map

The 'M' logo, at the station entrance and passenger direction signs, should not be confused with the 'Metro Istanbul' logo for the company that operates the train system throughout Istanbul.

The Istanbul Metro (Turkish: İstanbul metrosu) is a rapid transit railway network that serves the city of Istanbul, Turkey. Apart from the M11 line, which is operated by TCDD Taşımacılık, the system is operated by Metro Istanbul, a public enterprise controlled by the Istanbul Metropolitan Municipality. The oldest section of the metro is the M1 line, which opened on 3 September 1989. As of 2026, the system now includes 169 stations in service, with 30 more under construction. With 265.1 kilometers, Istanbul has the 22nd longest metro system in the world and the 4th longest in Europe as of 2026.

The system consists of eleven lines: the lines designated M1A, M1B, M2, M3, M6, M7, M9 and M11 are on the European side of the Bosporus, while lines M4, M5 and M8 are on the Asian side. Due to Istanbul's unique geography and the depth of the Bosporus strait which divides the city, the European and Asian metro networks do not connect directly. The two parts of the city are linked through the Marmaray commuter rail line, which is connected to the metro in several places. Three metro lines are under construction on the Asian side: M10 (Pendik Merkez–Fevzi Çakmak), M12 (60. Yıl Parkı–Kazım Karabekir), M13 (Emek-Yenidoğan) and M14 (Altunizade–Bosna Bulvarı). Additionally, extension works on the M1B and M7 lines (on the European side) and the M4 line (on the Asian side) are underway.

In addition to the Marmaray commuter rail, the metro connects to the F1, Tünel (F2), F3 and F4 funicular lines and with the network of the Istanbul Tram, Metrobüs and the cable cars.

== History ==
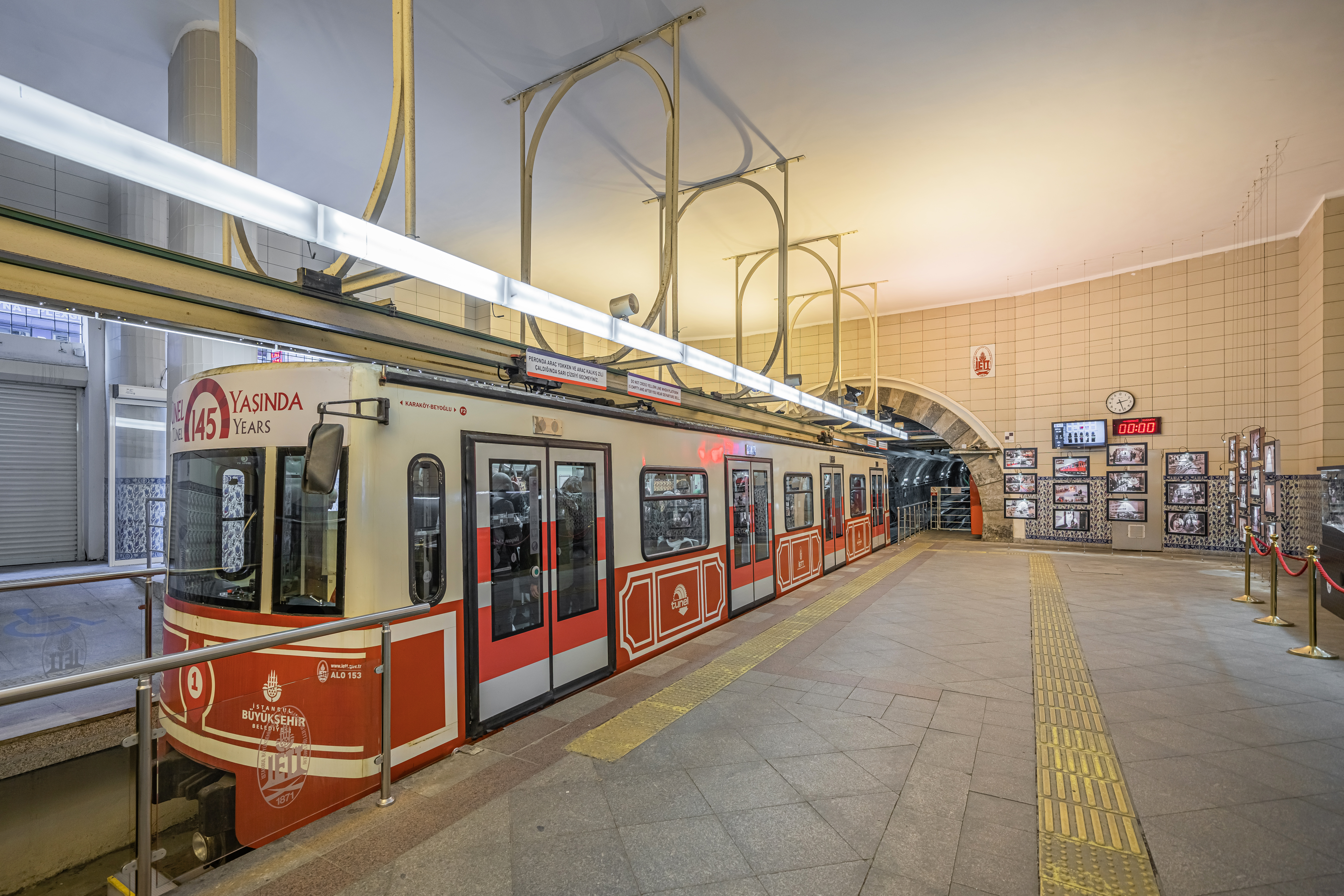
Karaköy station of the Tünel, which entered service on 17 January 1875

The oldest underground urban rail line in Istanbul is the Tünel, which entered service on 17 January 1875. It is the world's second-oldest underground urban rail line after the London Underground which was built in 1863, and the first underground urban rail line in continental Europe, however this is not recognised as the opening of the metro due to the line being Funicular.

The first master plan for a full metro network in Istanbul, titled Avant Projet d'un Métropolitain à Constantinople and conceived by the French engineer L. Guerby, dates to 10 January 1912. The plan comprised a total of 24 stations between the Topkapı and Şişli districts and included a connection through the Golden Horn. Each station would have a 75-metre (246 ft 1 in) platform next to the rail line, while the distance between stations varied from 220 to 975 metres (721 ft 9 in to 3,198 ft 10 in). The blueprints of the project, which was never realized, are today displayed at the Istanbul Technical University Museum.

In 1936 the French urban planner Henri Prost proposed a metro network between the districts of Taksim and Beyazıt, to the north and south of the Golden Horn, respectively. In October 1951 the Dutch firm Nedeco proposed a similar route between Taksim and Beyazıt, and in September 1952 the Director of the Paris Transportation Department, Marc Langevin, prepared a 14-chapter report together with his associate Louis Meizzonet for the implementation of the project and its integration with the other means of public transportation in the city. However, these plans never came into effect and all proposals were put on hold until 1987, when the planning for the current Istanbul Metro was made.

Logos used in the Istanbul metro

The logo designed by Faruk Çağla, who simultaneously won first, second and third prizes in the Istanbul metro emblem competition.

U logo used on subways built and operated by the Ministry of Transport and Infrastructure.

Construction works for the first 'modern' mass transit railway system started in 1989, with the first stations opening in September. İstanbul Ulaşım A.Ş. (now known as Metro Istanbul) was founded the previous year to operate the system. The M1 was initially called "Hafif Metro" (which literally translates as "light metro"). Although it was built as a fully grade separated line, the M1 line operates with shorter trainsets and shorter station platforms than is standard on a traditional metro line, hence its "light metro" designation. The M1 line was later extended from Aksaray towards the western suburbs, reaching Atatürk Airport in the southwest in 2002.

Construction of the M2 line began on 11 September 1992, but faced many challenges due to the numerous archaeological sites that were discovered during the drilling process, which slowed down or fully stopped the construction of many stations, especially in the south. Taking into account the seismic activity in Istanbul, the entire network was built with the cut-and-cover method to withstand an earthquake of up to 9.0 on the Richter magnitude scale.

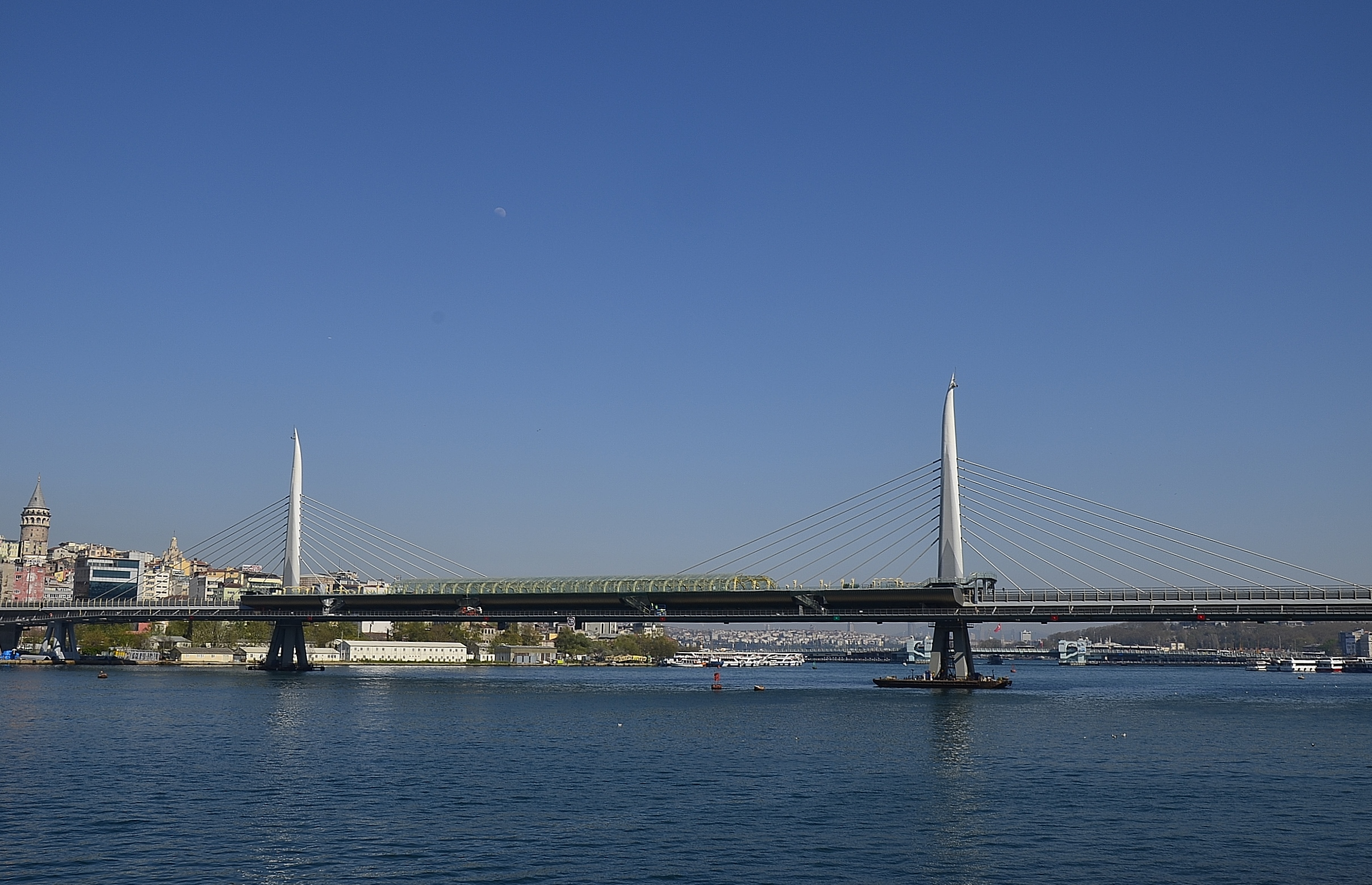
The Golden Horn Metro Bridge entered service in 2014.

The first section between Taksim and 4. Levent entered service, after some delays, on 16 September 2000. This line is 8.5 km (5.28 mi) long and has 6 stations, which all look similar but are in different colours. In 2000, there were 8 Alstom-built 4-car train sets in service, which ran every 5 minutes on average and transported 130,000 passengers daily. On 30 January 2009, the first train sets built by Eurotem entered service. Eurotem will build a total of 92 new trainsets for the M2 line. As of 30 January 2009, a total of 34 trainsets, each with 4 cars, were being used on the M2 line. A northern extension from 4. Levent to Maslak was opened on 30 January 2009. On 2 September 2010, the northern (temporary) terminus of Darüşşafaka followed up. The southern extension of the M2 line from Taksim to Yenikapı, across the Golden Horn with Haliç station on the bridge and underground through the historic peninsula, entered service on 15 February 2014. The Taksim-Yenikapı extension is 5.2 km (3.23 mi) long, with four stations. The total cost of the extension was $593 million. At Yenikapı, it will intersect with the extended M1 line and the Marmaray commuter line, which since its opening in 2013 has offered a connection between the Asian and European sides of the city.

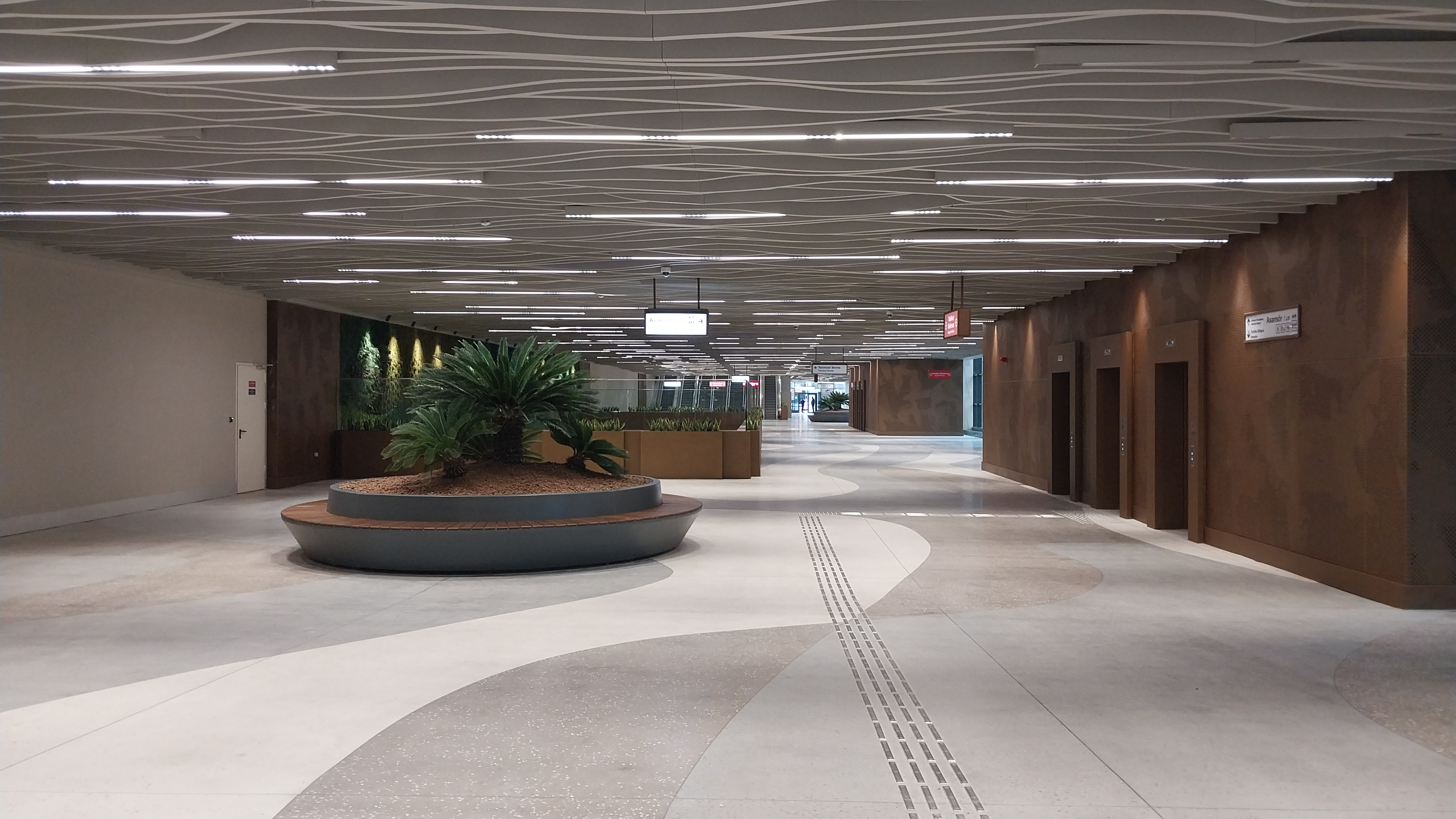
M11 Istanbul Airport Station

The trip between the Şişhane station in Beyoğlu and the Haciosman station in Maslak is 20 km (12.43 mi) long and takes 27 minutes; including Şişhane - Taksim (1.65 km (1.03 mi), 2 minutes), Taksim - 4. Levent (8.5 km (5.28 mi), 12 minutes), and 4. Levent - Haciosman (8.1 km (5.03 mi), 12 minutes.) The total length of the European side of the M2 line will reach 23 km (14.29 mi) when all 16 stations from Hacıosman to Yenikapı will be completed; not including the 93-metre (305 ft 1 in)-long Golden Horn Metro Bridge, the 0.6 km (0.37 mi) long Taksim-Kabataş tunnel connection with the Seabus port, and the 0.6 km (0.37 mi) long Yenikapı-Aksaray tunnel connecting the M1 line to the Yenikapı Transfer Center.

On the Asian side, construction is in progress of the remaining portion of the 26.5 km (16.47 mi) long M4 line from Kadıköy to Kaynarca, yielding a total of 19 stations. It cost €751 million and was built by the Astaldi / Makyol / Gülermak consortium. The first section opened on 17 August 2012, terminating in Kartal. Construction of the 20 km (12.43 mi) long M5 line from Üsküdar via Ümraniye to Çekmeköy started in March 2012.

== Operations ==
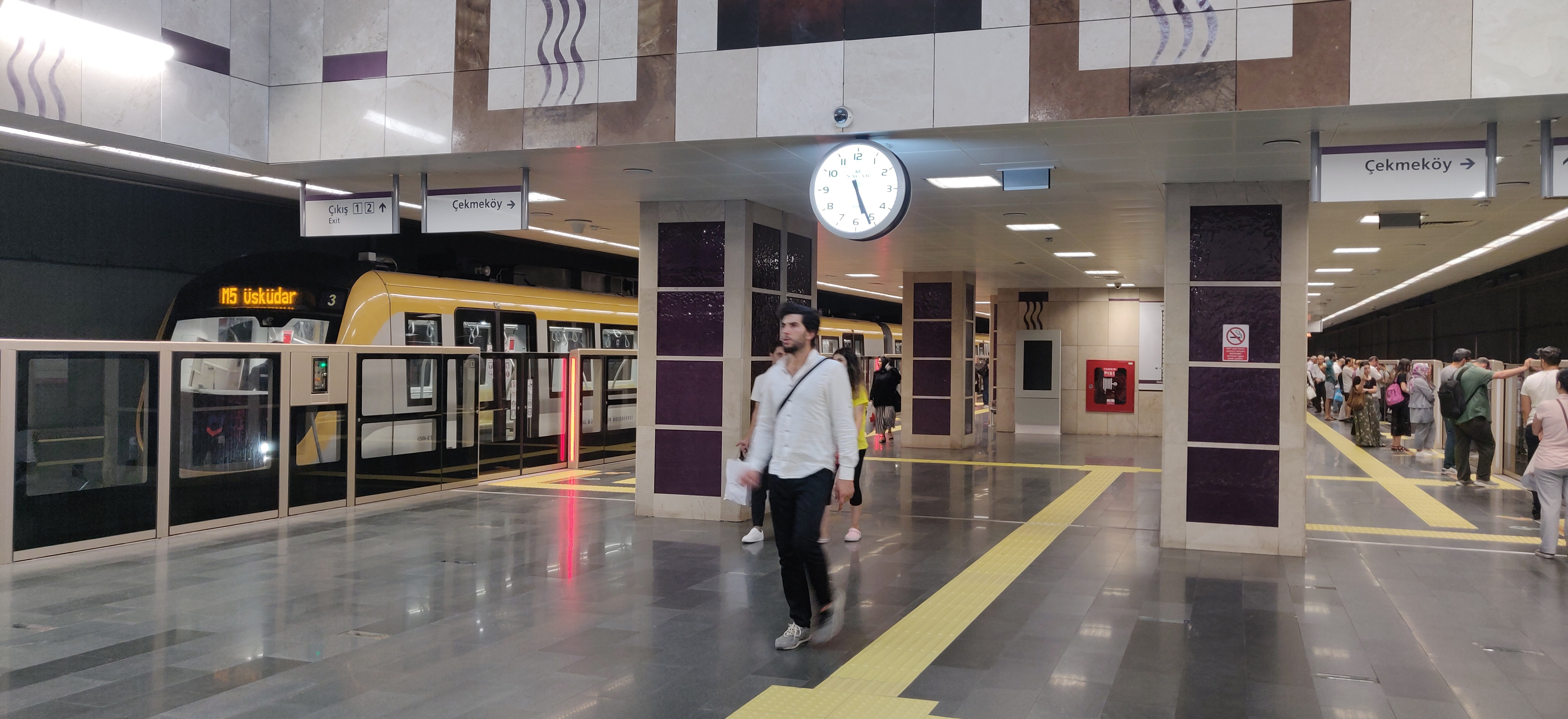
Üsküdar metro station on the M5 line

The Metro operates from 06:00 AM to 12 AM every 6–12 minutes, except for the M8 line, which temporarily operates from 06:00 AM to 23:00 PM. During peak hours, the intervals could be reduced to 3 to 4 minutes.

The metro has a flat fare of 46.20 TL, a student rate of 22.55 TL, and a fare of 33.08 TL for teachers and senior residents, when used with the Istanbulkart, the city's universal contactless payment card.

=== Night operations ===
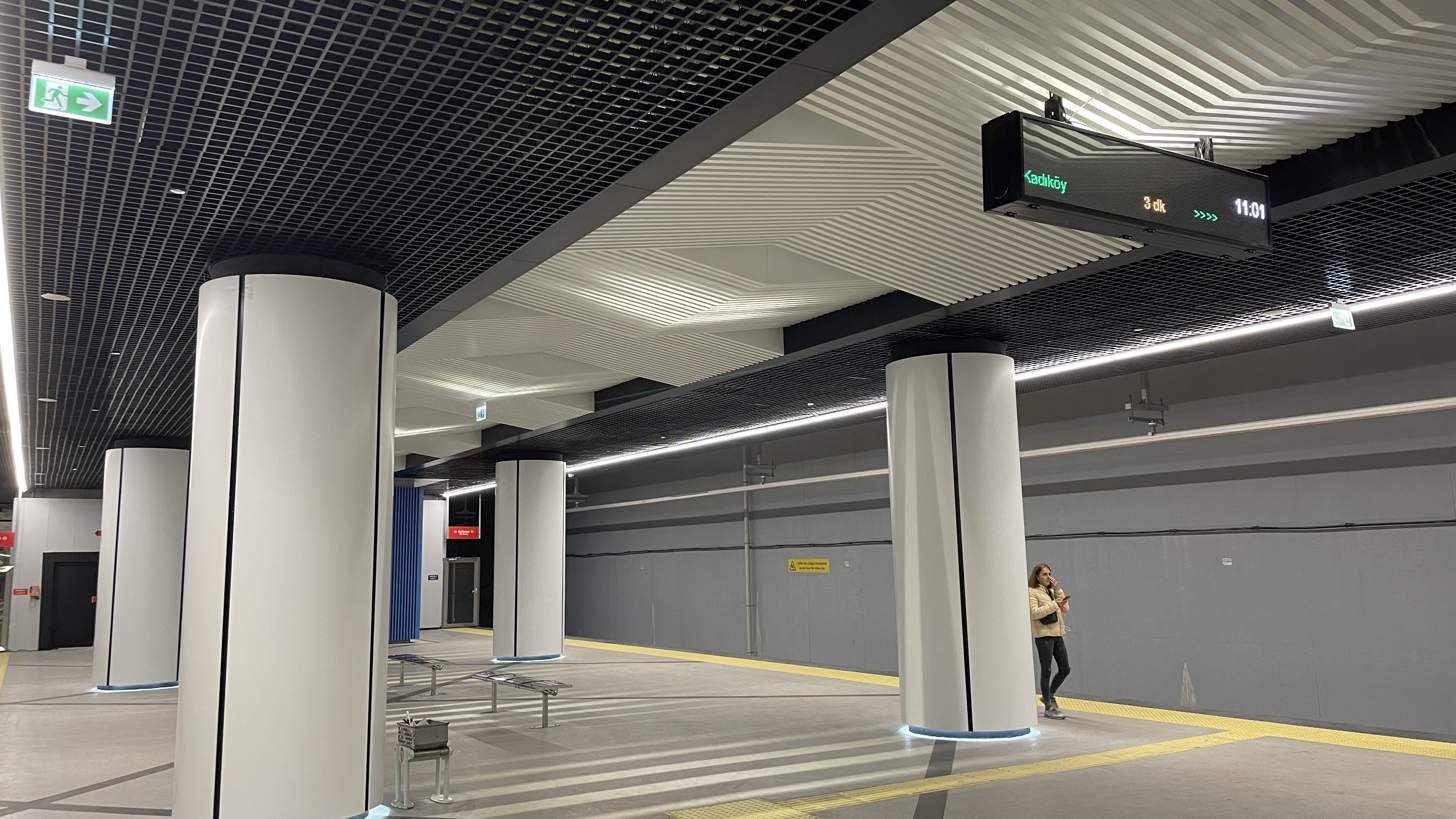
Sabiha Gökçen Station on the M4 line

On 30 August 2019 as a gesture for the Victory Day of Turkey, Mayor of Istanbul, Ekrem İmamoğlu, announced that many lines of Istanbul were going to provide 24 hours service during the weekends with trains at 20 minutes interval. Since August 2019, the Istanbul Metro started to provide 24 hours service for some lines on weekends and public holidays, but this service was discontinued in March 2020 due to coronavirus pandemic. On 5 March 2022 Metro Istanbul announced that the night metro service would be re-started on the following lines: M1A Yenikapı-Atatürk Airport, M1B Yenikapı-Kirazli, M2 Yenikapı-Hacıosman, M4 Kadıköy-Sabiha Gökçen Airport, M5 Üsküdar-Çekmeköy, and M6 Levent-Boğaziçi University/Hisarüstü, and later added M7 Mecidiyeköy-Mahmutbey on 14 July 2022.

== Lines ==
Each line is given a different color and name. The letter "M" stands for metro, while "T" stands for tram, "F" stands for funicular, "TF" stands for cable car and "B" for suburban. Frutiger LT Pro is used as the font for the icons.

| Line | Route | Side | Opened(first) | Length | Stations | Notes |
|---|---|---|---|---|---|---|
| M1 (Istanbul Metro) | Yenikapı ↔ Atatürk Airport / Kirazlı | European | 1989 | 26.8 km | 23 | Branches diverge at Otogar. Branch M1A runs to Atatürk Airport. Branch M1B runs to Kirazlı, with an extension to Halkalı Üniversite under construction, and the section between Halkalı Üniversite and Halkalı currently on hold.; The line operates from 06:00 AM to 00.00 AM.; Trains are currently four cars in length, 5 car trains will run in the future |
| M2 (Istanbul Metro) | Yenikapı ↔ Hacıosman | European | 2000 | 23.49 km | 16 | There is a branch line between Sanayi Mahallesi and Seyrantepe.; Operates from 06:00 AM to 00:00 AM.; Maximum 8 car trains, 4 car trains during off peak |
| M3 (Istanbul Metro) | Bakırköy-Sahil ↔ Kayaşehir Merkez | European | 2013 | 26.7 km | 20 | Operates from 06:00 AM to 00.00 AM.; Physical maximum 8 car trains (only 4 car trains used at this point due to ridership) |
| M4 (Istanbul Metro) | Kadıköy ↔ Sabiha Gökçen Airport | Asian | 2012 | 33.5 km | 23 | An extension to Kaynarca Merkez is under construction. A further extension to Tuzla is on hold.; Operates from 06:00 AM to 00.00 AM.; Maximum 8 car trains, 4 car trains used during off peak |
| M5 (Istanbul Metro) | Üsküdar ↔ Sultanbeyli | Asian | 2017 | 30.9 km | 24 | Operates from 06:00 AM to 00.00 AM.; Maximum 6 car trains, fully automated |
| M6 (Istanbul Metro) | Levent ↔ Boğaziçi Üniversitesi/Hisarüstü | European | 2015 | 3.3 km | 4 | Called the "Mini-Metro", M6 is actually a light metro line.; Single track between stations, maximum 4 car trains |
| M7 (Istanbul Metro) | Yıldız ↔ Mahmutbey | European | 2020 | 20 km | 17 | Opened partially on 28 October 2020. Fulya and Yıldız stations were put into service on 2 January 2023. Yıldız-Kabataş section is still under construction. Mahmutbey-Hastane section is under construction.; Physical maximum 8 car trains, but only 4 car trains used at the moment, fully automated |
| M8 (Istanbul Metro) | Bostancı ↔ Parseller | Asian | 2023 | 14.27 km | 13 | Opened on 6 January 2023.; Medium capacity system, maximum 4 car trains, fully automated; Operates from 06:00 AM to 11.00 PM. |
| M9 (Istanbul Metro) | Olimpiyat ↔ Ataköy | European | 2021 | 17.2 km | 14 | Opened partially on 29 May 2021 between Olimpiyat and Bahariye stations. On 18 March 2024, the line was fully put into service between Olimpiyat and Ataköy stations.; Physical maximum 4 car trains |
| M11 (Istanbul Metro) | Gayrettepe ↔ Halkalı | European | 2023 | 69 km | 15 | Higher maximum speed (120 km) than other lines, uses metro trains akin to Chinese metro type B trains in a 4 car configuration, fully automated |
| TOTAL: | | | | 265.16 km | 169 | |

== Stations ==
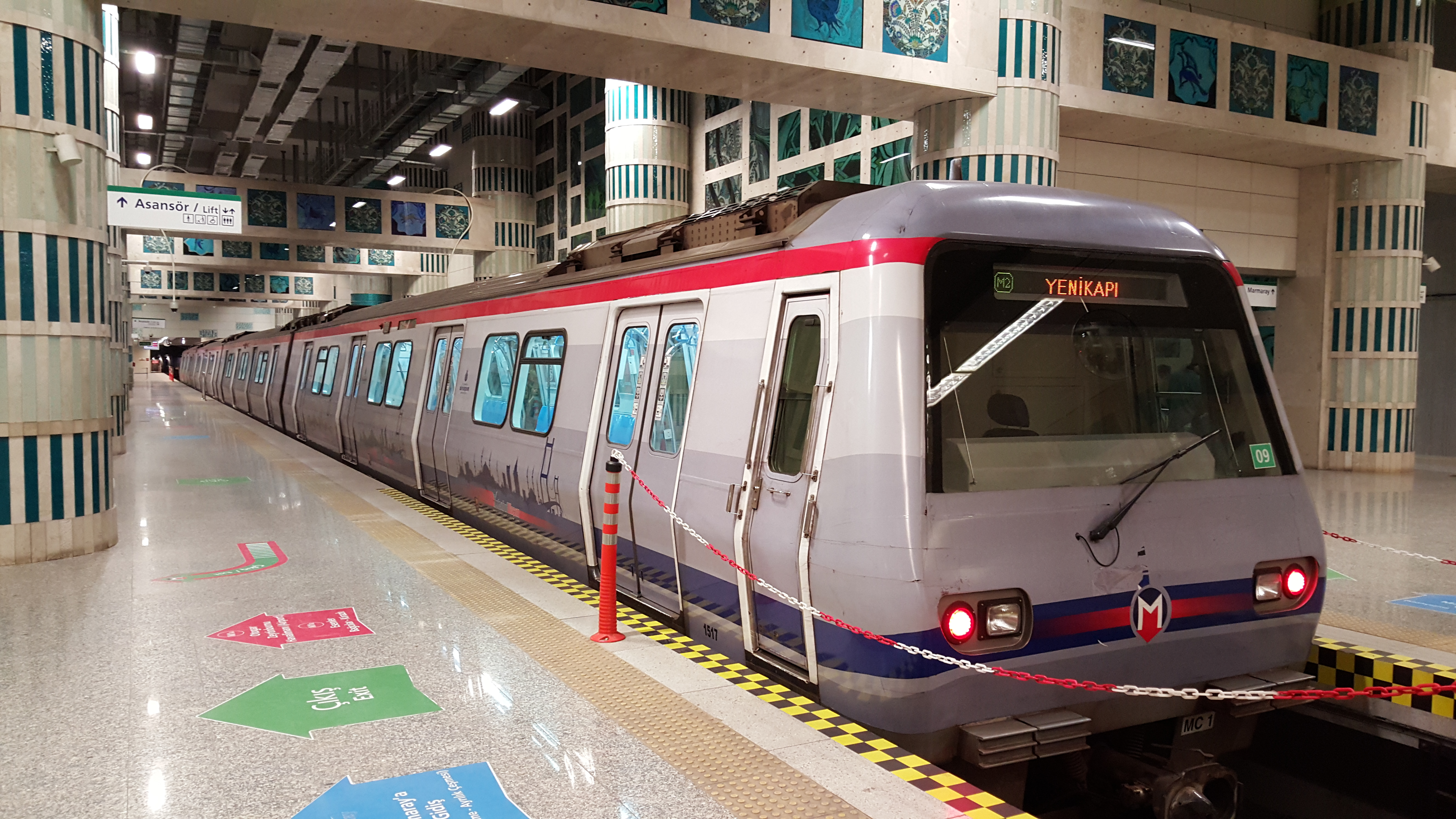
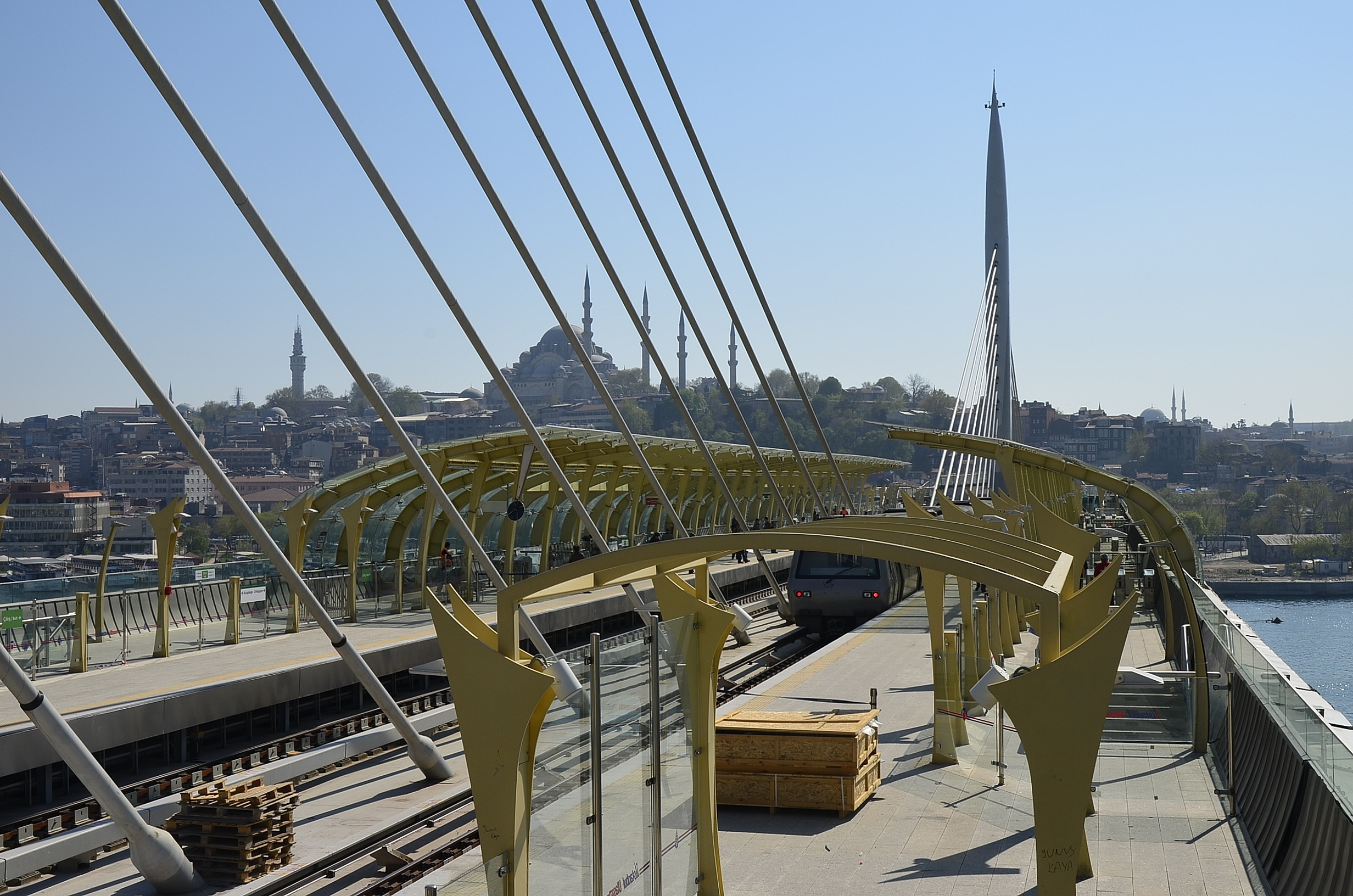
M2 (Istanbul Metro) (left) and Golden Horn Metro Bridge Station (right)

The Istanbul Metro system has a total of 159 stations in operation with 35 more under construction. Since the majority of the system is underground, stations are generally accessed going down from street level. At every station entrance there is a post with the Istanbul metro "M" logo and the station name underneath it except for the M11 line which has the "U" logo next to its own entrances. Entrances are usually built into sidewalks along a street, although many stations of newer lines have their entrances from street level on small plazas.

Like Moscow Metro, the majority of the stations of the Istanbul Metro are generally deep level due to the city's hilly geography.

Out of the 159 operating stations of the Istanbul Metro:

- 147 are fully underground
- 7 are elevated stations
- 7 are on an embankment or at-grade
- 2 are partially underground

=== Mezzanines ===
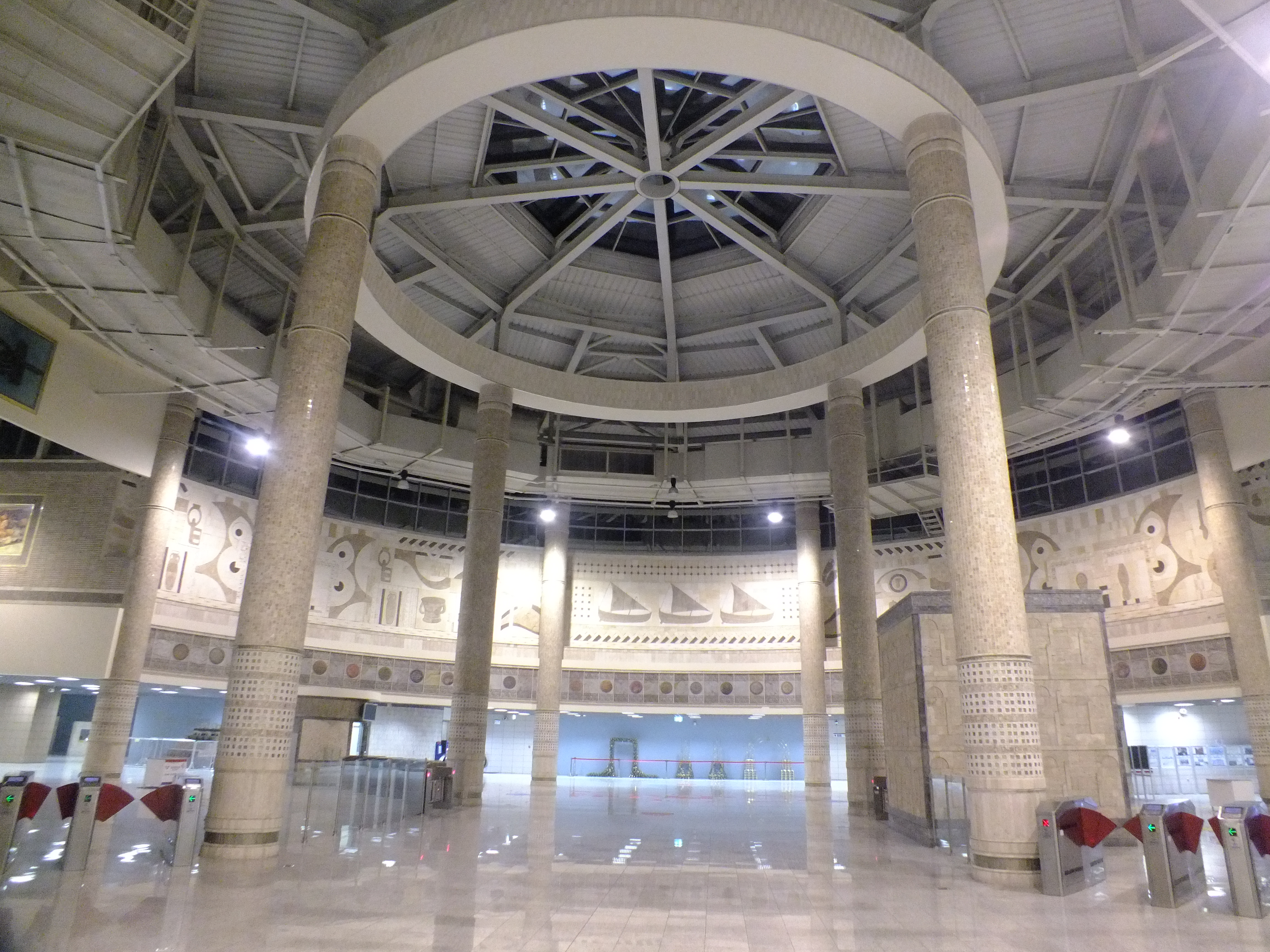
The mezzanine concourse at Yenikapı station (M1 and M2)

Most stations have a mezzanine directly below street level, which allows passengers to enter the stations from multiple locations and proceed to the correct platform without having to cross any streets. Inside the mezzanines are ticket machines and turnstiles, where passengers must pay to enter fare control zones and proceed to the trains.

In some stations, mezzanines connect directly to nearby buildings and structures, such as shopping malls or business centres. Each station concourse or mezzanine are patrolled by Istanbul Metro security guards to prevent fare evasion and crime.

Stations with large walkways toward different exits, such as Taksim, also have travelators to cover the long walking distances.

Upon entering the station, passengers may use ticket vending machines or staffed ticket booths to purchase their fare, which can be stored on the Istanbulkart contactless smart card. After entering the fare-controlled area, via the turnstiles, passengers may continue further down to the platform level.

=== Platforms ===
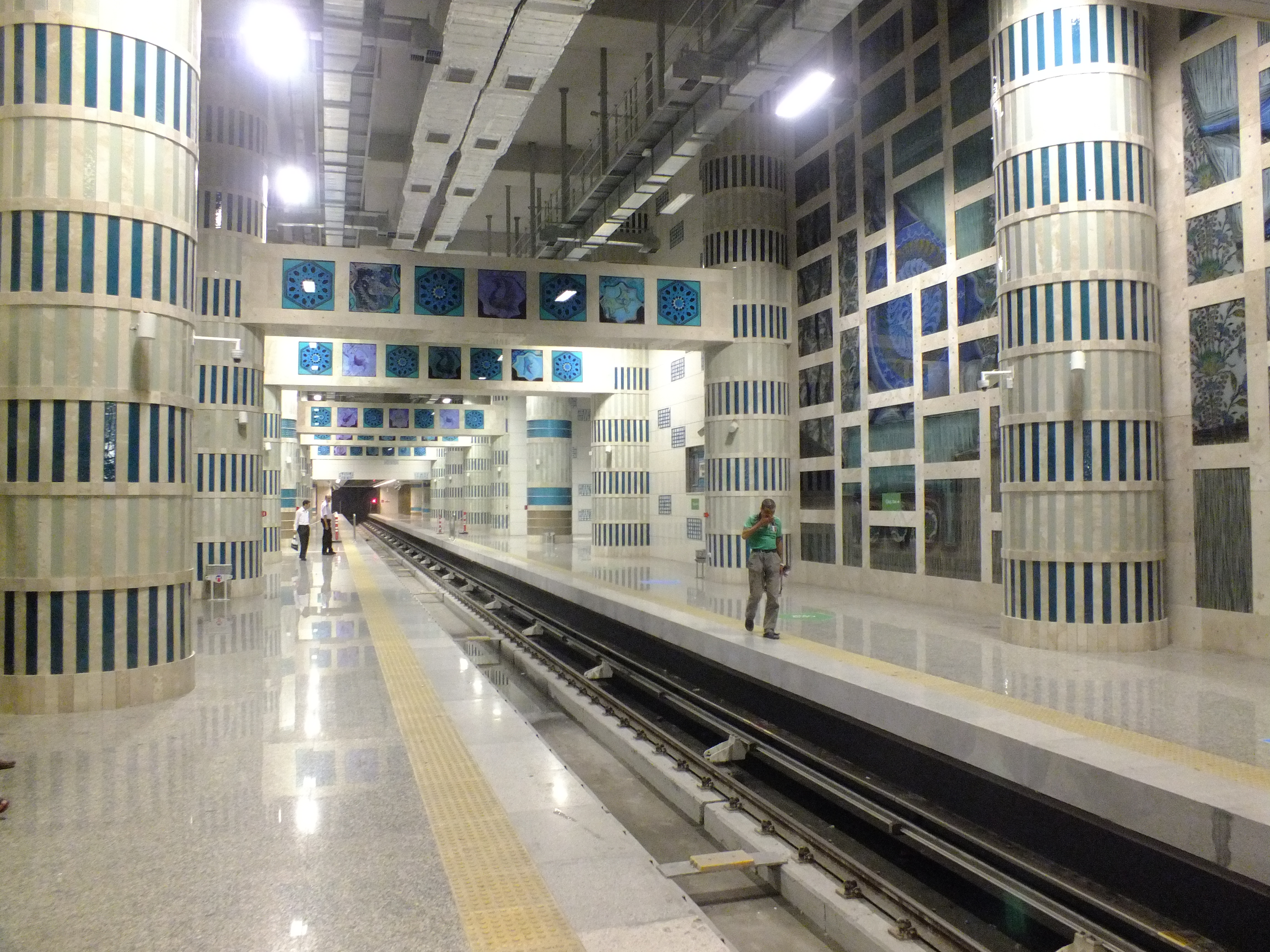
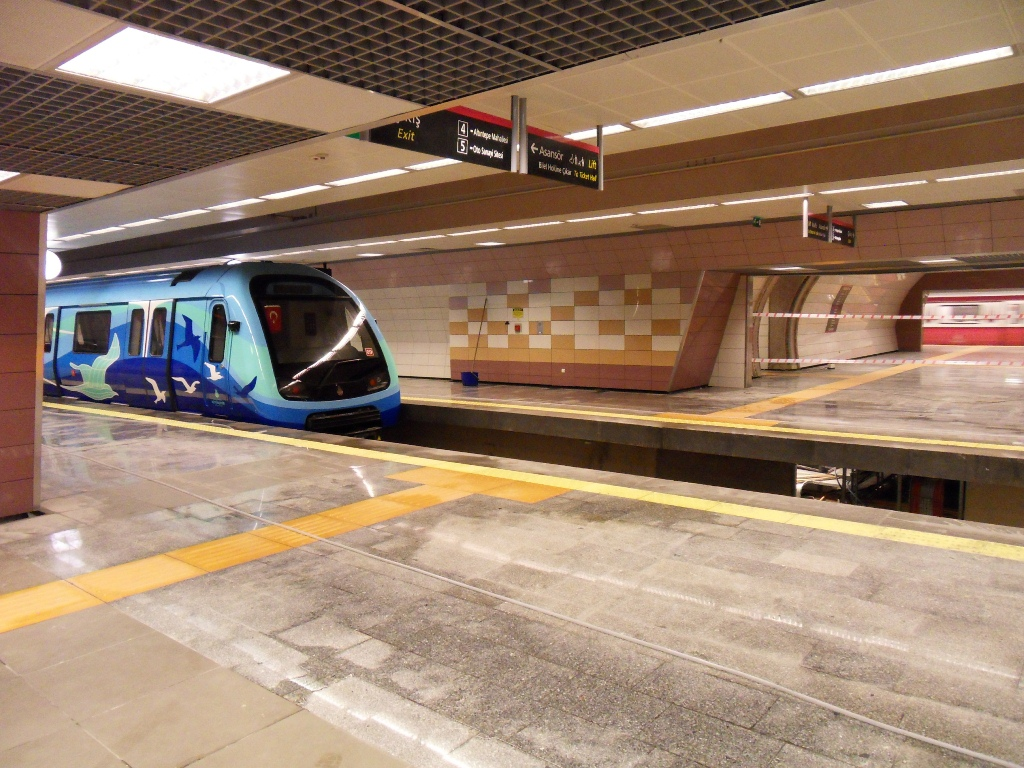
Yenikapı (left) on the M1 and M2 lines and Bostancı (right) on the M4 line are among the stations which have two island platforms and three tracks

Since the different lines of the Istanbul Metro have different specifications, most notably car length, there is no uniform length for platforms. The oldest platforms of the network, built between 1989 and 2002 on the M1 line, are 100 m (328 ft 1 in) and can accommodate trains up to 4 cars long. Platforms on the M2, M3, M4, M7 and M11 lines span about 180 m (590 ft 7 in) and can each accommodate trains up to 8 cars long. Platforms on the M5 line can accommodate up to 6-car trains, whiles platforms on the M6, M8, and M9 lines are accommodate 4-car trains.

Sections of platforms are subject to close during off-peak hours, especially on the M2 line. While platforms on the M2 line are open fully during peak hours, capacity is reduced to 4-car trains during off-peak hours. Platforms on the M5, M7, M8 and M11 lines are protected by platform edge doors. Except on funicular lines, most platforms of the Istanbul Metro consist of two side platforms or one island platform. Five stations consist of two island platforms, serving three tracks in a configuration known as the Spanish Solution. These stations are Otogar on the M1 line, Yenikapı and Sanayi on the M2 line, Olimpiyat on the M9 line, and Bostancı on the M4 line.

=== Design ===
The stations on the M1 line, which were built in the 1980s and 1990s, are very functional and plain in design. Like many stations built during this period, the stations use fluorescent tubes as light sources, and are decorated with tiled floors and ceiling panels made of white plastic ceiling slats. Platforms of stations on the M1 line are supported by square and tiled central columns (e.g. Aksaray, Emniyet - Fatih and Topkapı - Ulubatlı.)

Stations on the M2 line built between 2000 and 2011, care was taken to use light colors. For this reason, the basic wall color of the stations is white. In order to make people not confuse the stations and to make them more memorable, some characteristic patterns were also implemented. (e.g. colored stripes/tiles on walls).

Stations on the M7 line, which were built between 2017 and 2020, mostly use a combination of gray and white colors. Since the line has fully automated driverless vehicles, passengers are prevented from falling onto the tracks by using platform screen doors (PSDs).

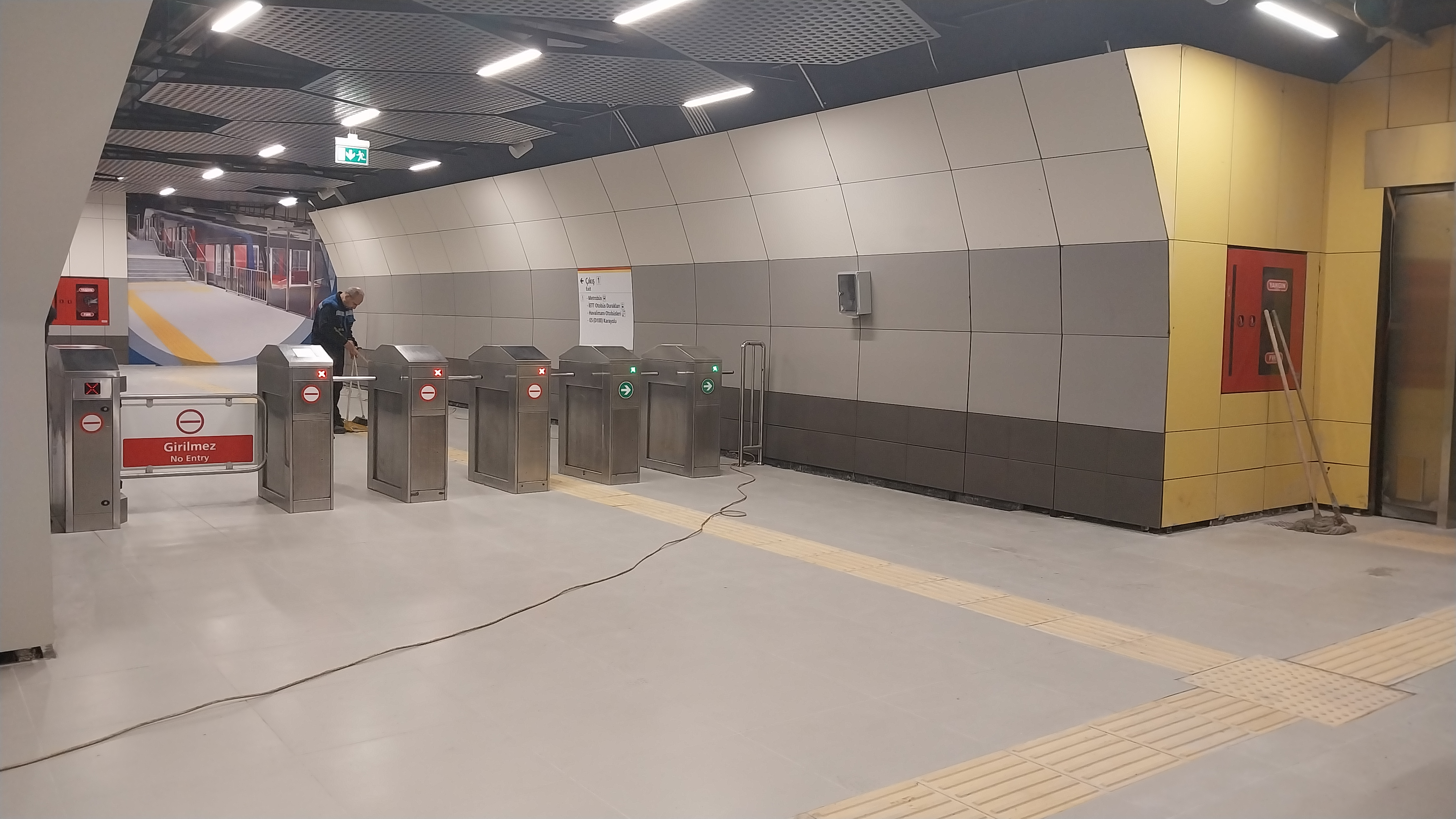
M1 Yenibosna station

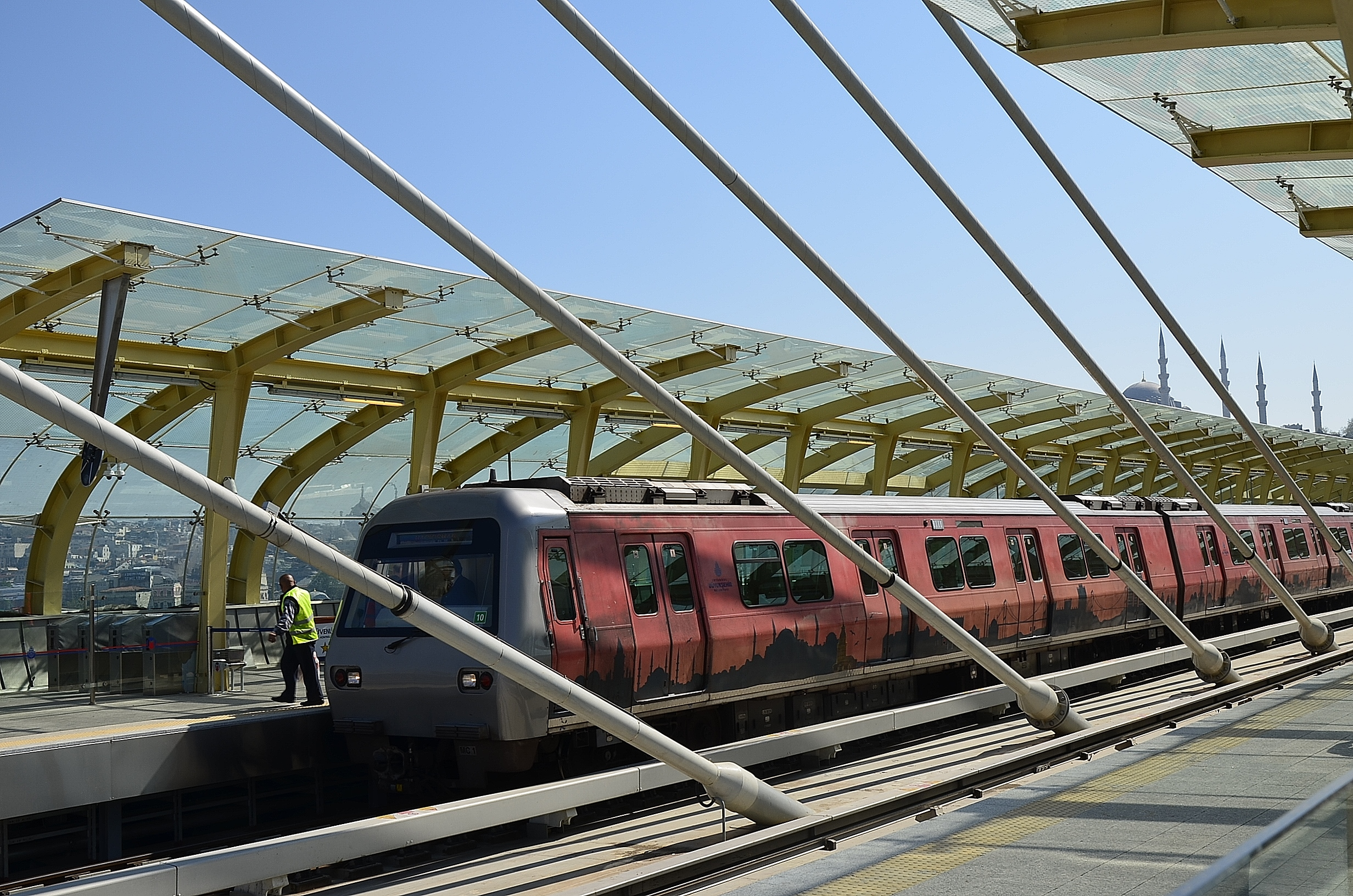
M2 Golden Horn Metro Bridge station

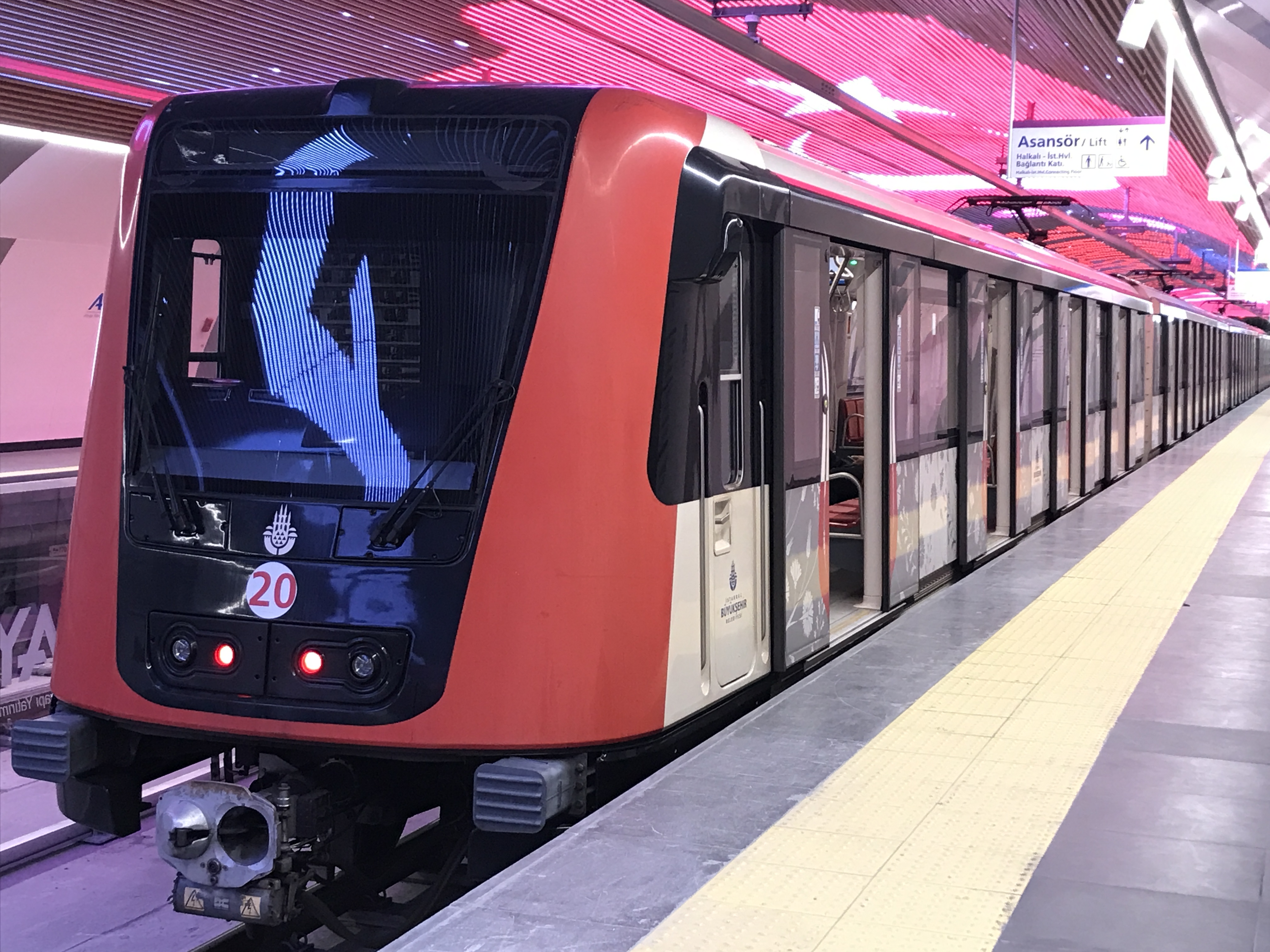
M3 Kayaşehir Merkez station

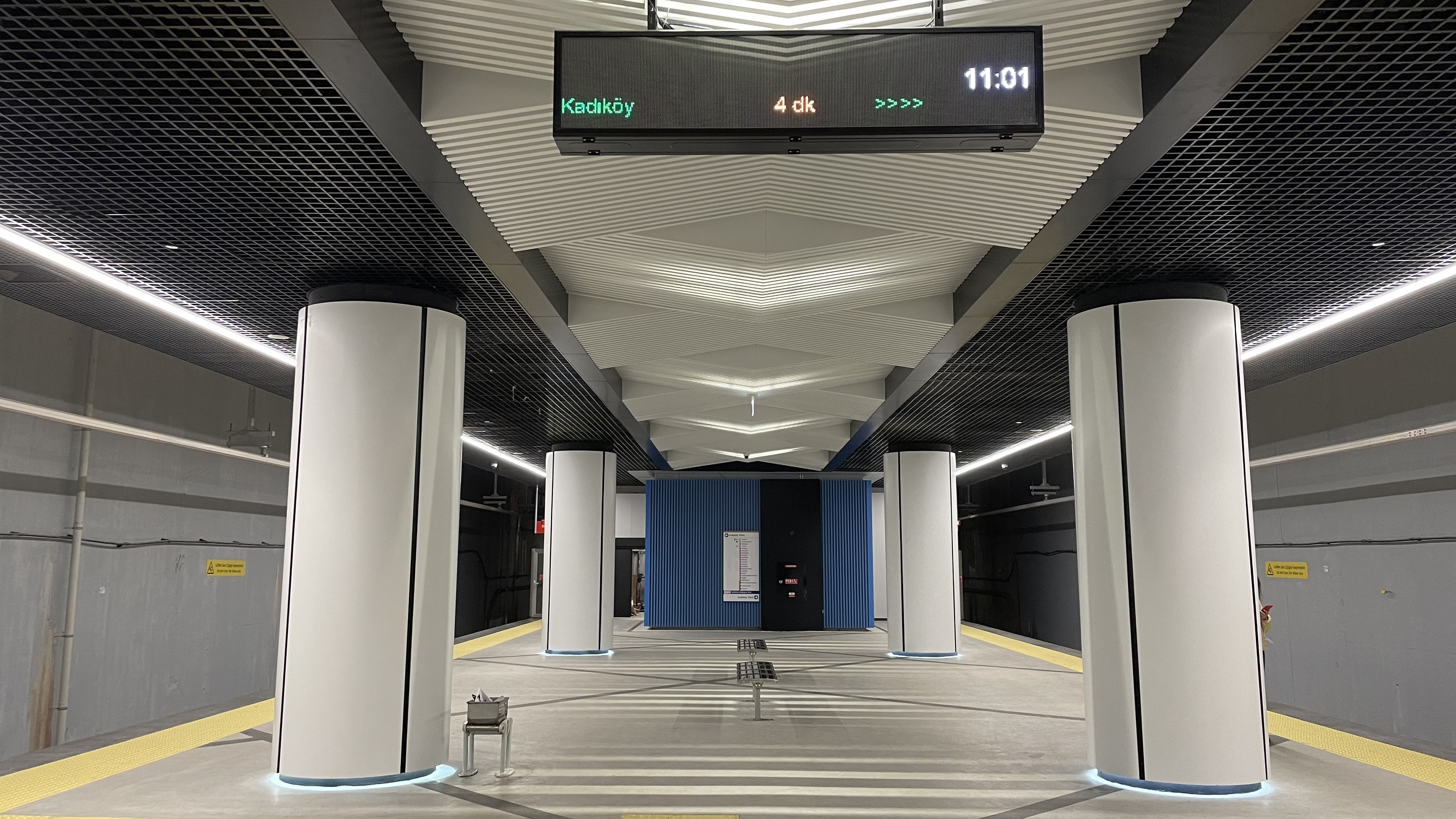
M4 Istanbul Sabiha Gökçen International Airport (Sabiha Gökçen Airport) station

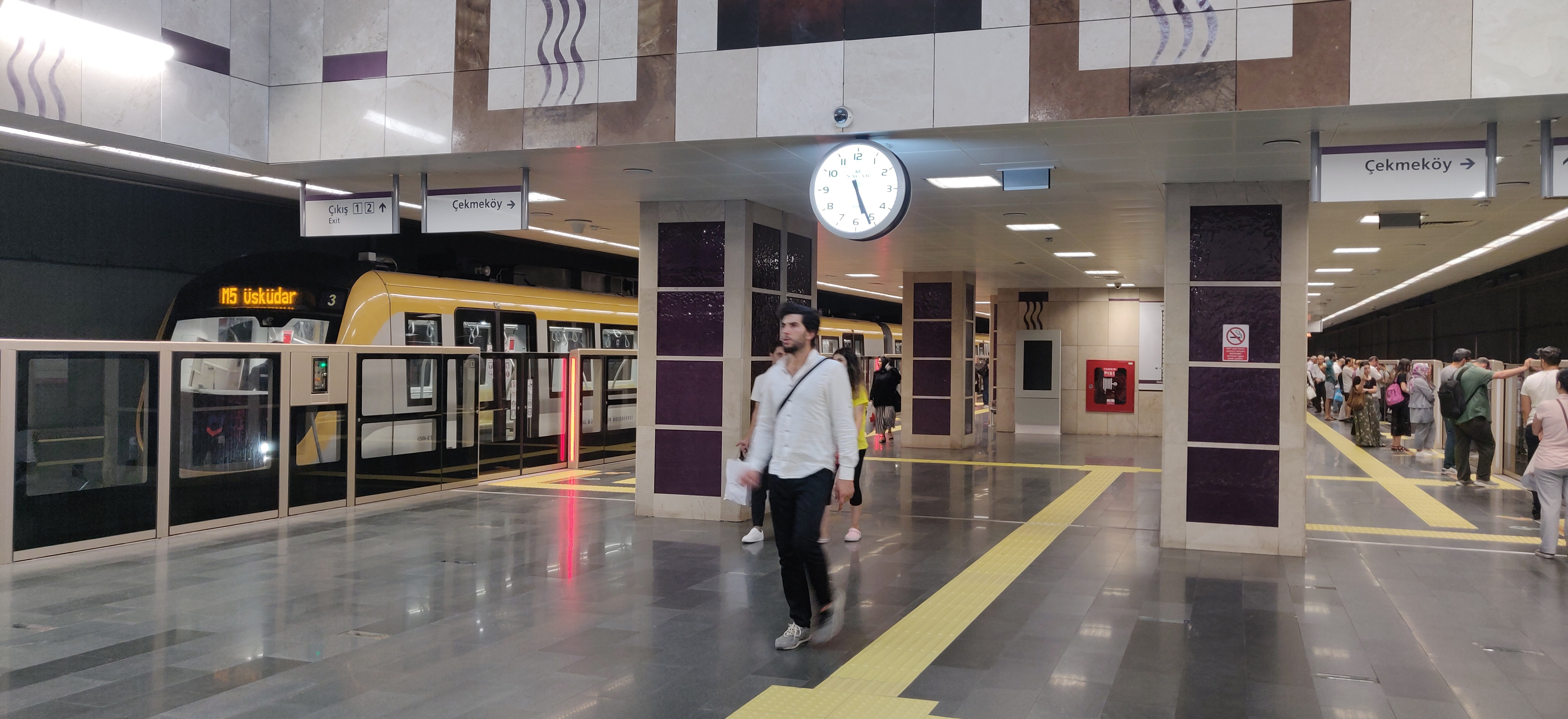
M5 Üsküdar station

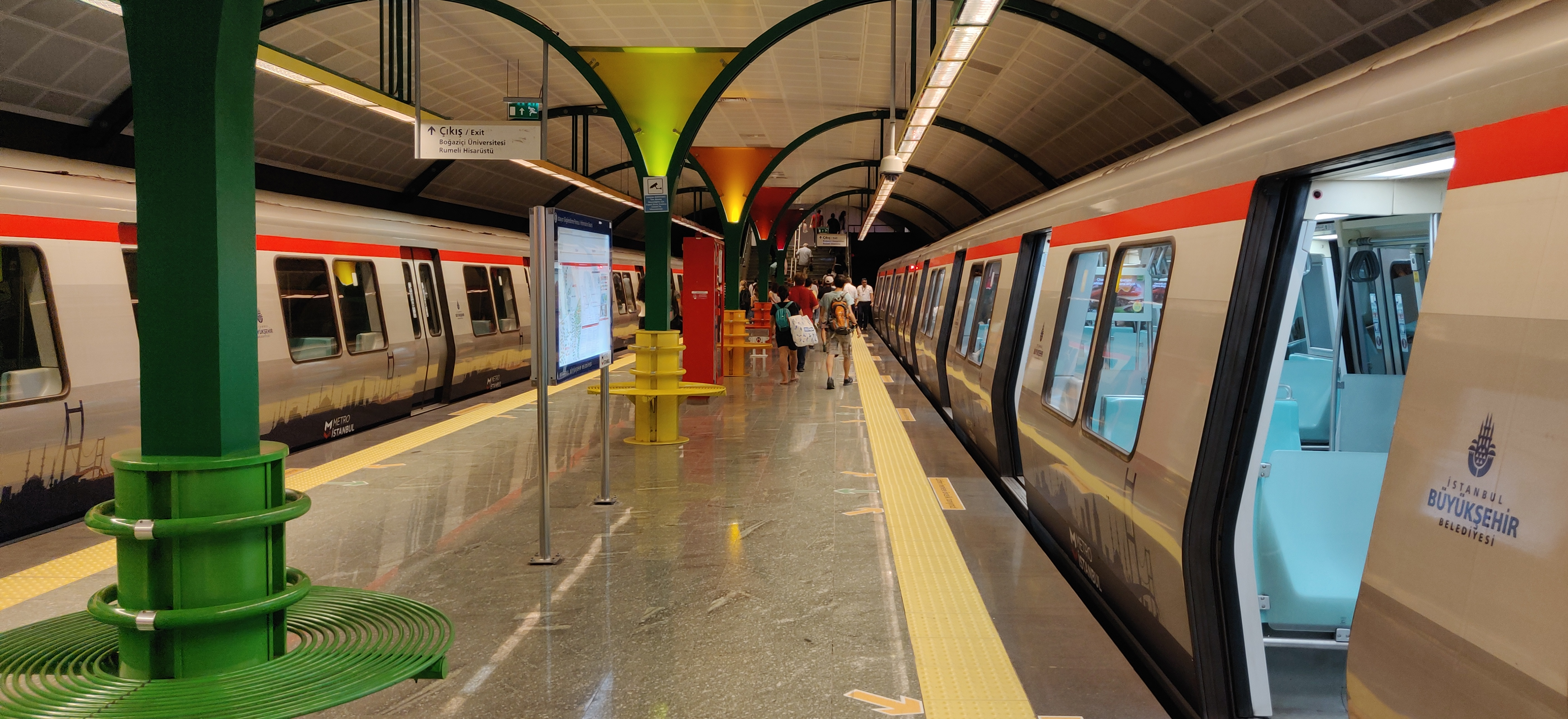
M6 Boğaziçi Üniversitesi/Hisarüstü station

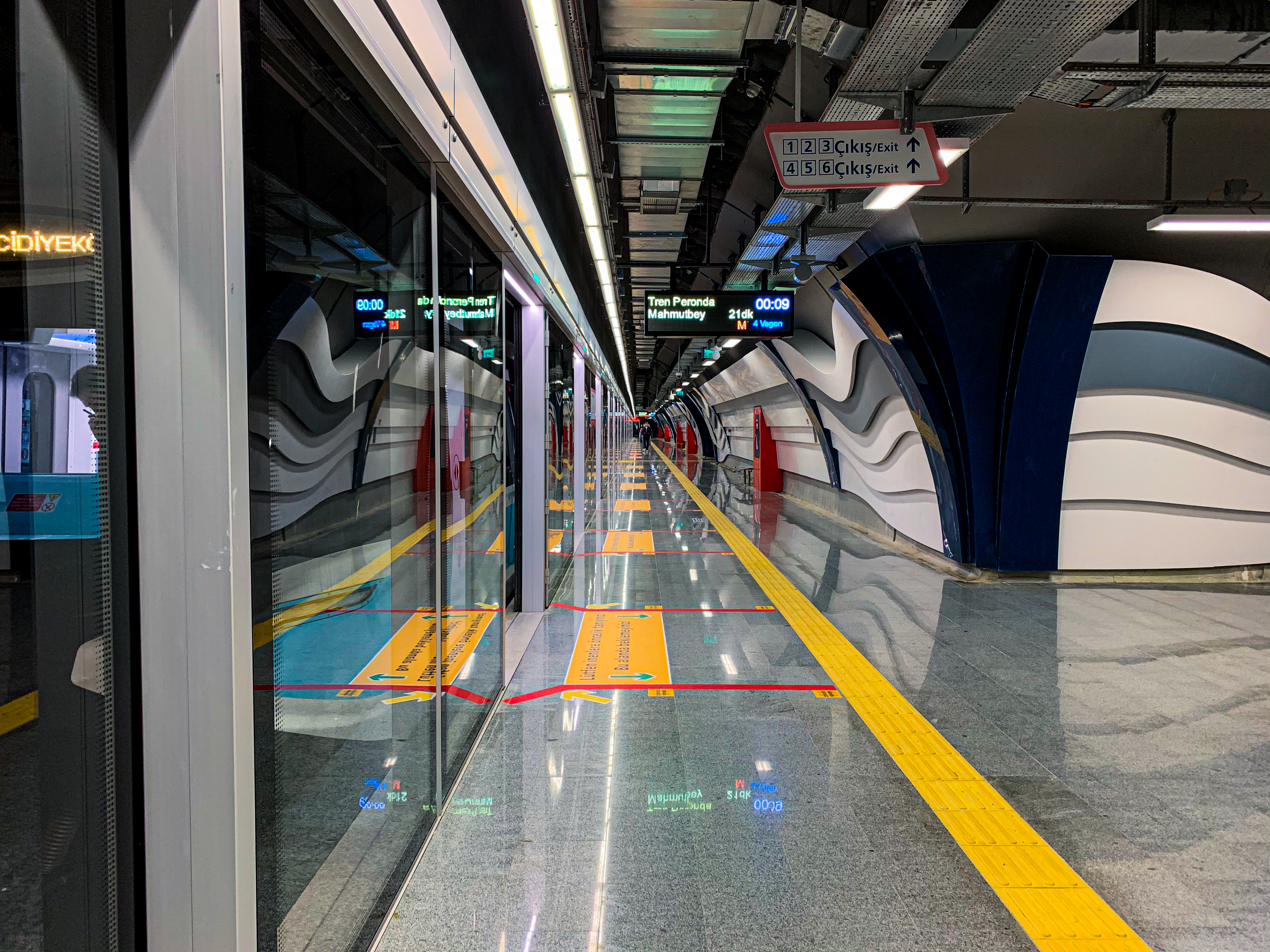
M7 Mecidiyeköy station

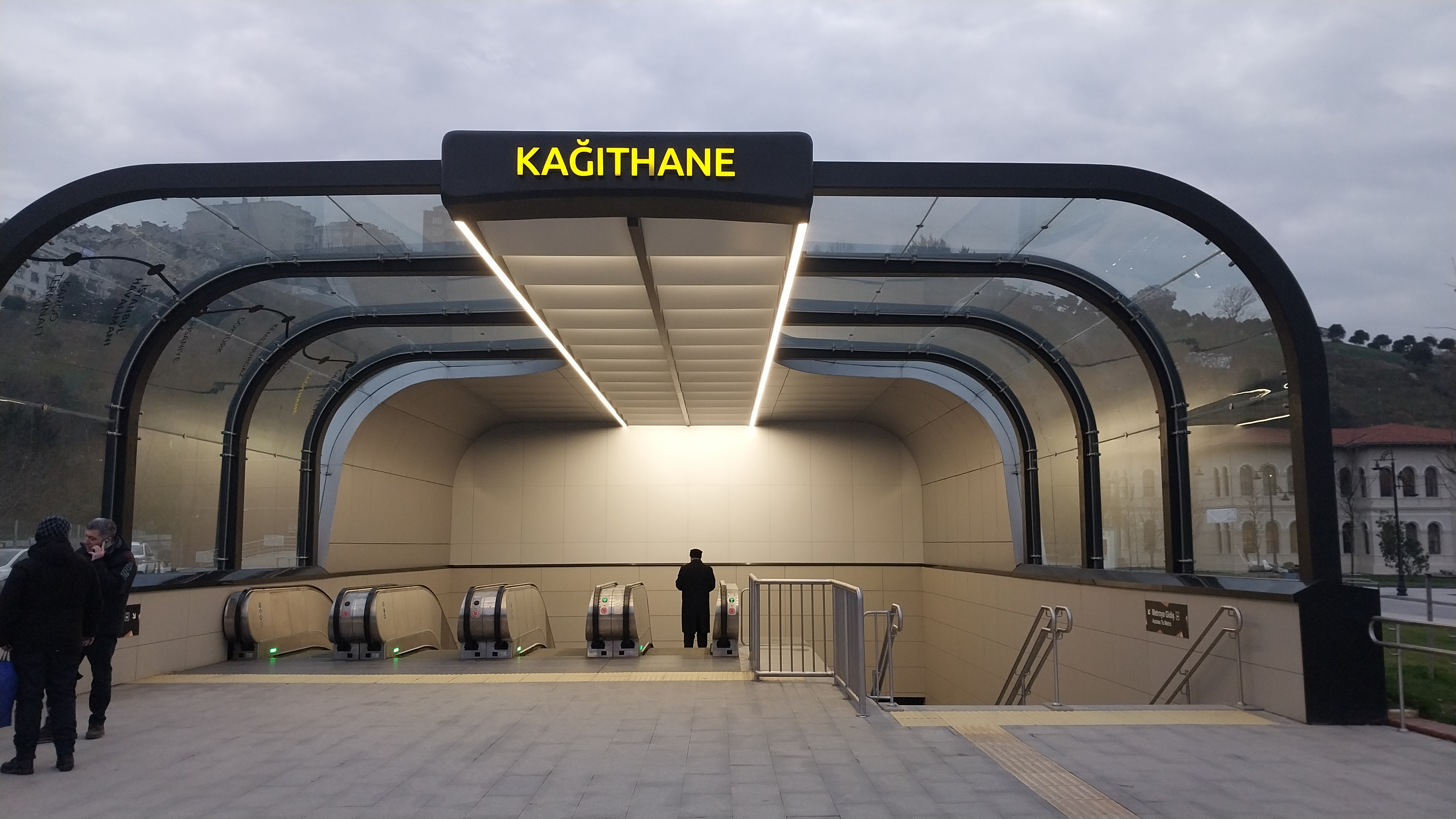
M11 Istanbul Airport Kağıthane Station

== Technical specifications ==
This table lists technical characteristics of the metro lines that are currently in service or under construction.

| Line | Route | Gauge | Voltage | Conductor system | Notes |
|---|---|---|---|---|---|
| M1A (Istanbul Metro) | Yenikapı ↔ Atatürk Airport | 1,435 mm (4 ft 8 1/2 in) standard gauge | 750 V DC | Overhead line | Light Metro |
| M1 (Istanbul Metro) | Yenikapı ↔ Kirazlı | 1,435 mm (4 ft 8 1/2 in) standard gauge | 750 V DC | Overhead line | Light Metro |
| M2 (Istanbul Metro) | Yenikapı ↔ Hacıosman | 1,435 mm (4 ft 8 1/2 in) standard gauge | 750 V DC | Third rail | |
| M3 (Istanbul Metro) | Bakırköy-Sahil ↔ Kayaşehir Merkez | 1,435 mm (4 ft 8 1/2 in) standard gauge | 1,500 V DC | Overhead line | |
| M4 (Istanbul Metro) | Kadıköy ↔ Sabiha Gökçen Airport | 1,435 mm (4 ft 8 1/2 in) standard gauge | 1,500 V DC | Overhead line | |
| M5 (Istanbul Metro) | Üsküdar ↔ Sultanbeyli | 1,435 mm (4 ft 8 1/2 in) standard gauge | 750 V DC | Overhead line | The first driverless metro in Turkey |
| M6 (Istanbul Metro) | Levent ↔ Boğaziçi Üniversitesi Hisarüstü | 1,435 mm (4 ft 8 1/2 in) standard gauge | 750 V DC | Third rail | Mini light Metro |
| M7 (Istanbul Metro) | Yıldız ↔ Mahmutbey | 1,435 mm (4 ft 8 1/2 in) standard gauge | 1,500 V DC | Overhead line | The first driverless metro in Istanbul European Side |
| M8 (Istanbul Metro) | Bostancı ↔ Parseller | 1,435 mm (4 ft 8 1/2 in) standard gauge | 1,500 V DC | Overhead line | Driverless metro |
| M9 (Istanbul Metro) | Olimpiyat ↔ Ataköy | 1,435 mm (4 ft 8 1/2 in) standard gauge | 1,500 V DC | Overhead line | |
| M10 (Istanbul Metro) | Pendik YHT ↔ Sabiha Gökçen Airport | 1,435 mm (4 ft 8 1/2 in) standard gauge | 1,500 V DC | Overhead line | Under Construction |
| M11 (Istanbul Metro) | Gayrettepe ↔ Halkalı | 1,435 mm (4 ft 8 1/2 in) standard gauge | 1,500 V DC | Overhead line | Operated by TCDD |
| M12 (Istanbul Metro) | 60. Yıl Parkı ↔ Kazım Karabekir | 1,435 mm (4 ft 8 1/2 in) standard gauge | 1,500 V DC | Overhead line | Under Construction |
| M13 (Istanbul Metro) | Söğütlüçeşme ↔ Yenidoğan | 1,435 mm (4 ft 8 1/2 in) standard gauge | 1,500 V DC | Overhead line | Partially Under Construction |
| | Altunizade ↔ Ümraniye Spor Köyü | 1,435 mm (4 ft 8 1/2 in) standard gauge | 1,500 V DC | Overhead line | Partially Under Construction |
| | Sefaköy – TÜYAP | 1,435 mm (4 ft 8 1/2 in) standard gauge | 1,500 V DC | Overhead line | Planned |
| | Beylikdüzü ↔ Sabiha Gökçen Havalimanı | | | | Hızray Project (Planned) |

== Alignment and interchanges ==
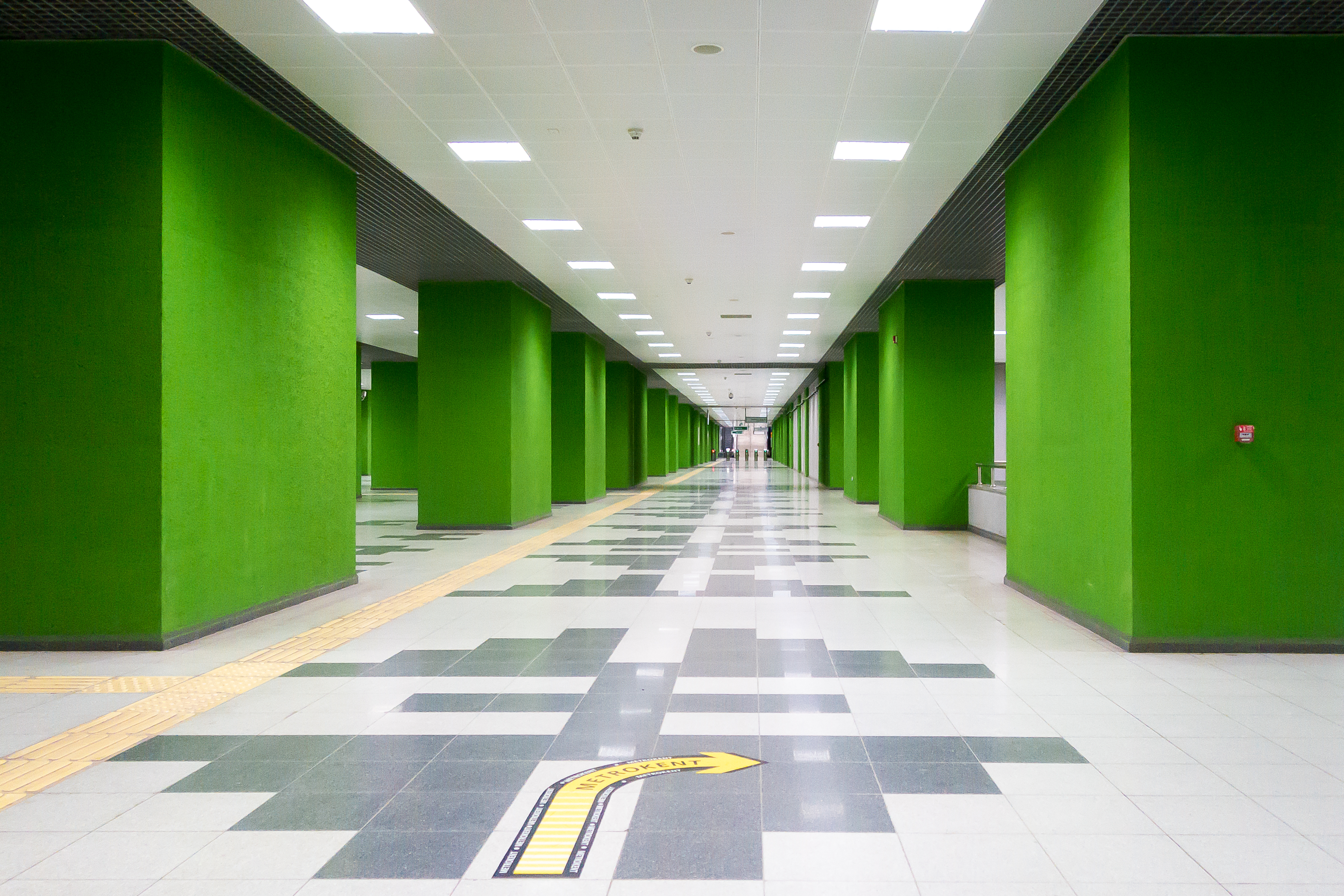
M3 Mahmutbey Metro Station

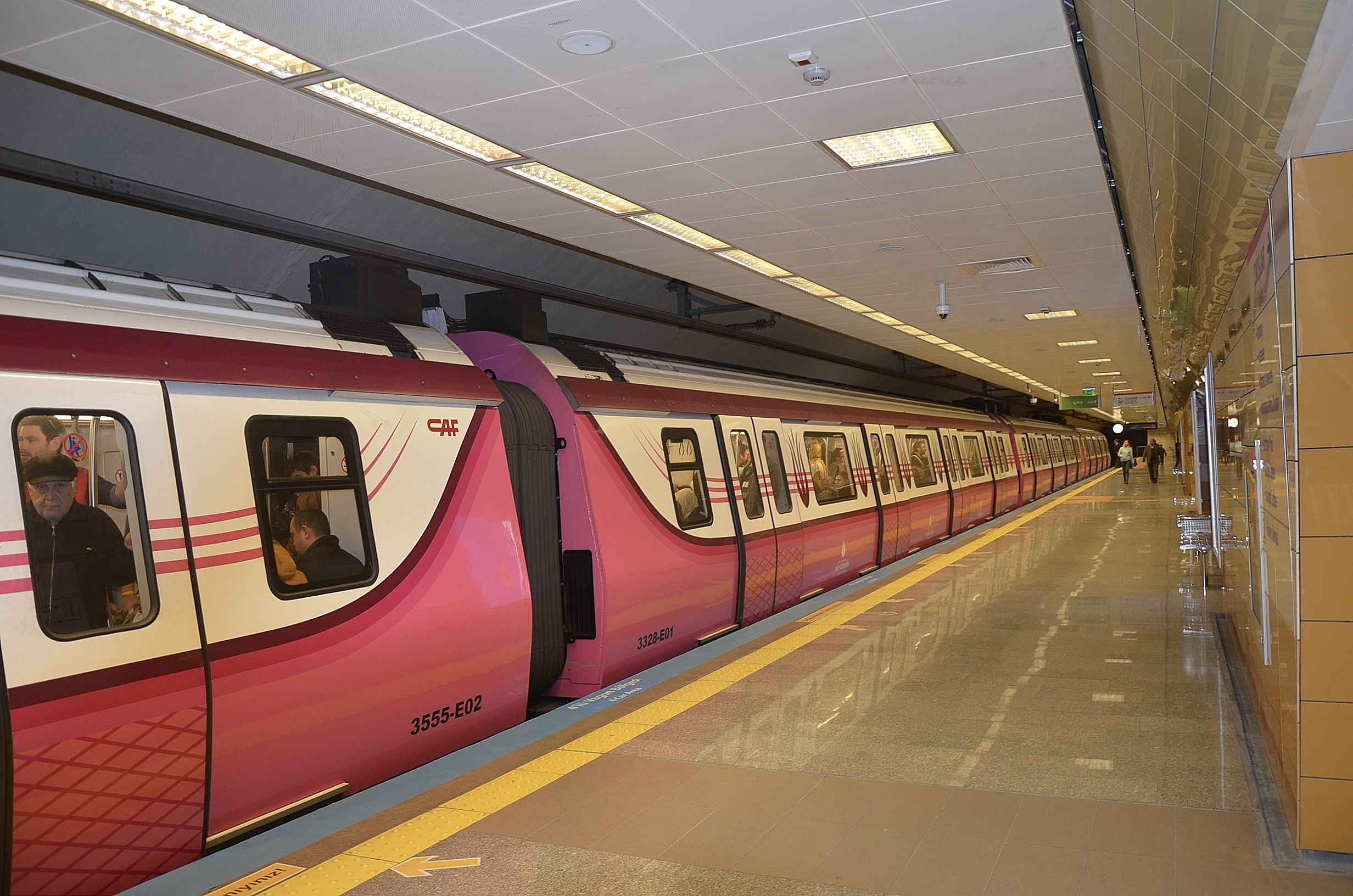
M4 Ayrılıkçeşmesi Metro Station

Apart from the Haliç station on the M2 line, about half of the M1 (mostly M1A) line, Alibeyköy and Kağıthane valleys crossing by the M7 line, viaduct section at Menekşe River of the M3 line and viaduct section at Olimpiyat of the M9 line, the lines are fully underground. All station names are on the bus lines as well.

The M2 line has an interchange between F1 in Taksim and an interchange tunnel with the Zincirlikuyu Metrobus station at the Gayrettepe station. There is also a transfer station at Yenikapı with Marmaray, M1 line and İDO Ferry Port; from where it is possible to take the high-speed catamaran Seabus departing for Bursa, Bandırma or Yalova; as well as the other Seabus ports of Istanbul such as Bostancı, Kadıköy, Bakırköy and Kabataş.

The M3 line interchanges with the M11 line at Kayaşehir Merkez station, M9 line at İkitelli Sanayi station, M7 line at Mahmutbey station, M1 line at Kirazlı station, M2, M1 and Metrobus at Bakırköy–İncirli station, and lastly Marmaray (B1) and YHT at Özgürlük Meydanı station.

The M4 line has a vapur (traditional ferry), motorboat, İDO and nostalgic tram interchange at Kadıköy which is the heart of Istanbul's Asian side. One can also interchange to Marmaray at Ayrılık Ceşmesi station. Also at Ünalan / Uzunçayır, the line has a Metrobus interchange just like Gayrettepe in M2.

The M5 line interchanges with the Marmaray and İDO at Üsküdar station. At Altunizade station the line has a Metrobus interchange. It has an interchange with the M8 line at Dudullu station.

The M6 line interchanges with the M2 line at Levent station.

The M7 line interchanges with the M2 line at the Mecidiyeköy station, with the T4 tramway line at the Kiptaş-Venezia/Karadeniz station, and with the M3 at Mahmutbey station.

The M8 line interchanges with the Marmaray and YHT at Bostancı station, M4 line at Kozyatağı station and with the M5 line at Dudullu station.

The M9 line interchanges with the M11 line at Olimpiyat station, M3 line at Ikitelli station, M1A line at Yenibosna station and Marmaray (B1) at Ataköy station.

The M11 line interchanges with the M2 line and Metrobus at Gayrettepe station, M7 line at Kağıthane station, M3 line at Kayaşehir station, M9 line at Olimpiyatköy station and Marmaray, YHT and TCDD at Halkalı station.

== Rolling stock ==
Aside from running on standard gauge tracks and all models having 4 doors per side, the rolling stock is generally incompatible, with few track connections to other lines and rolling stock generally will never run on any line other than whatever they first were delivered to. As each line is generally self-contained, this has rarely become an issue.

=== History ===
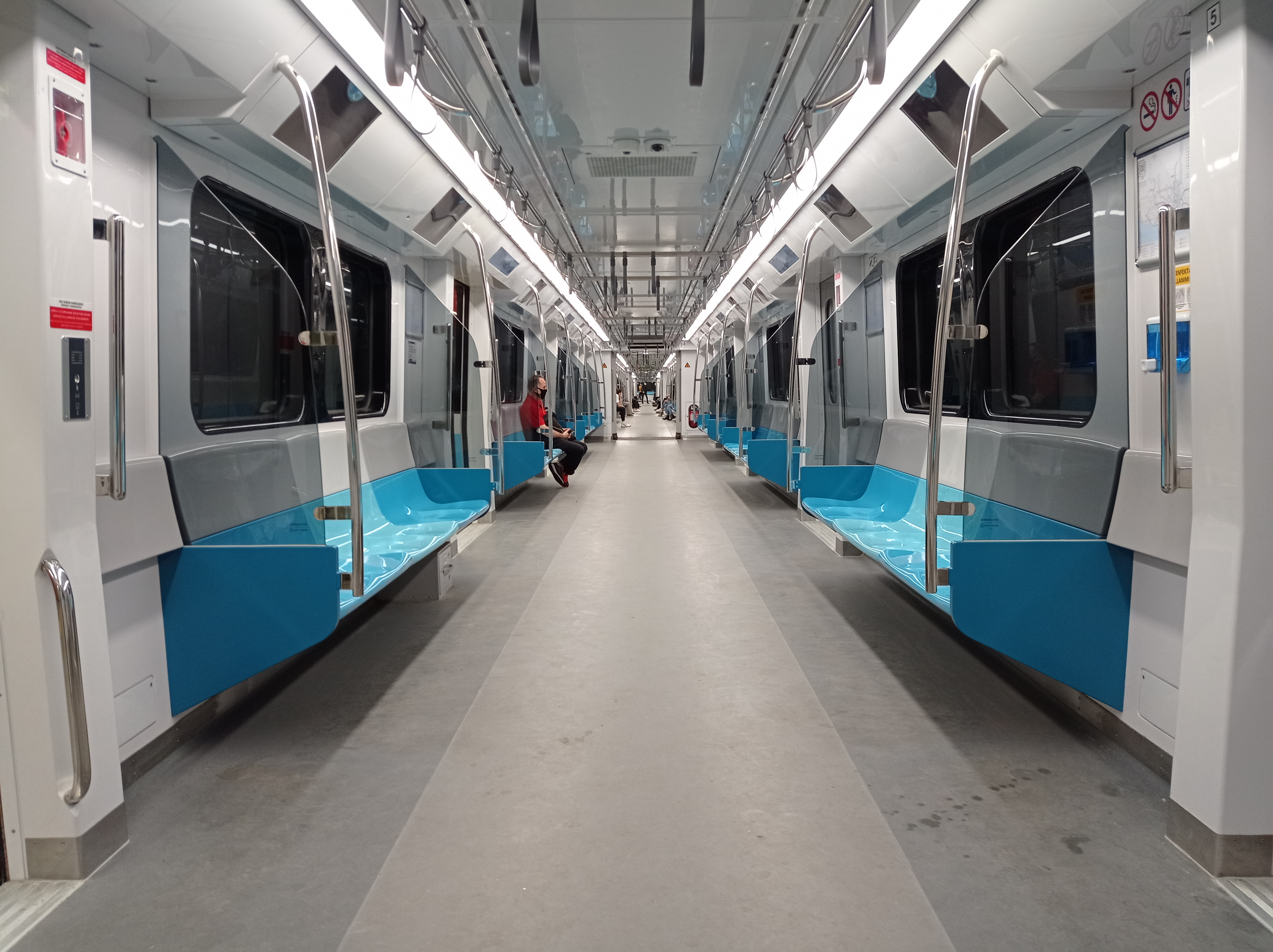
Interior of M7 rolling stock

The first Istanbul full metro rolling stocks, which entered service on 16 September 2000, on the Taksim - 4. Levent line, were built by Alstom. These trains are air-conditioned and equipped with LCD screens, and share a similar exterior design to the first three generations of rolling stock used on the Caracas Metro in Venezuela.

On 30 January 2009, the first 8 trains (each with 4 wagons) built by Eurotem (the Turkish factory of Hyundai Rotem) entered service. Today the system has 268 trains. These trains are also air conditioned and equipped with LCD screens, as well as dynamic route map showing the location and direction of the train.

In September 2009, CAF signed a contract to supply 144 units for the M4 metro line, amounting to 1.1 million euros. These metro units are formed with 4 cars for a total length of 90 meters and have a maximum transport capacity of 1300 passengers.

In August 2013, tender for the 126 driverless train units for the M5 line was won by CAF and Mitsubishi with 119 million euros. The first units were delivered in November 2016.

In March 2016, Eurotem signed a contract to supply 300 driverless units for the M7 line, amounting to 280.200.000 euros.

=== Rolling stocks by line ===
==== M1A and M1B ====
Although line M1 is a (light) metro line, its rolling stock—in use since 1989—is made up of typical ABB light rail vehicles (LRVs). These are partly the same as those used on the T4 tramway line. The rolling stock of the line is planned to be refurbished and made driverless.

==== M2 and M6 ====
The rolling stock on the M2 and M6 lines, which totals a number of 192 units, is made up of Alstom vehicles from France and Hyundai Rotem vehicles from South Korea which are manufactured in Adapazarı by Eurotem. All wagons have 8 double doors, making them have 4 openings on each side per wagon, the rolling stock also includes a fast passenger change, heating, air conditioning and broadcasting system. These lines are the only lines to use third rail power.

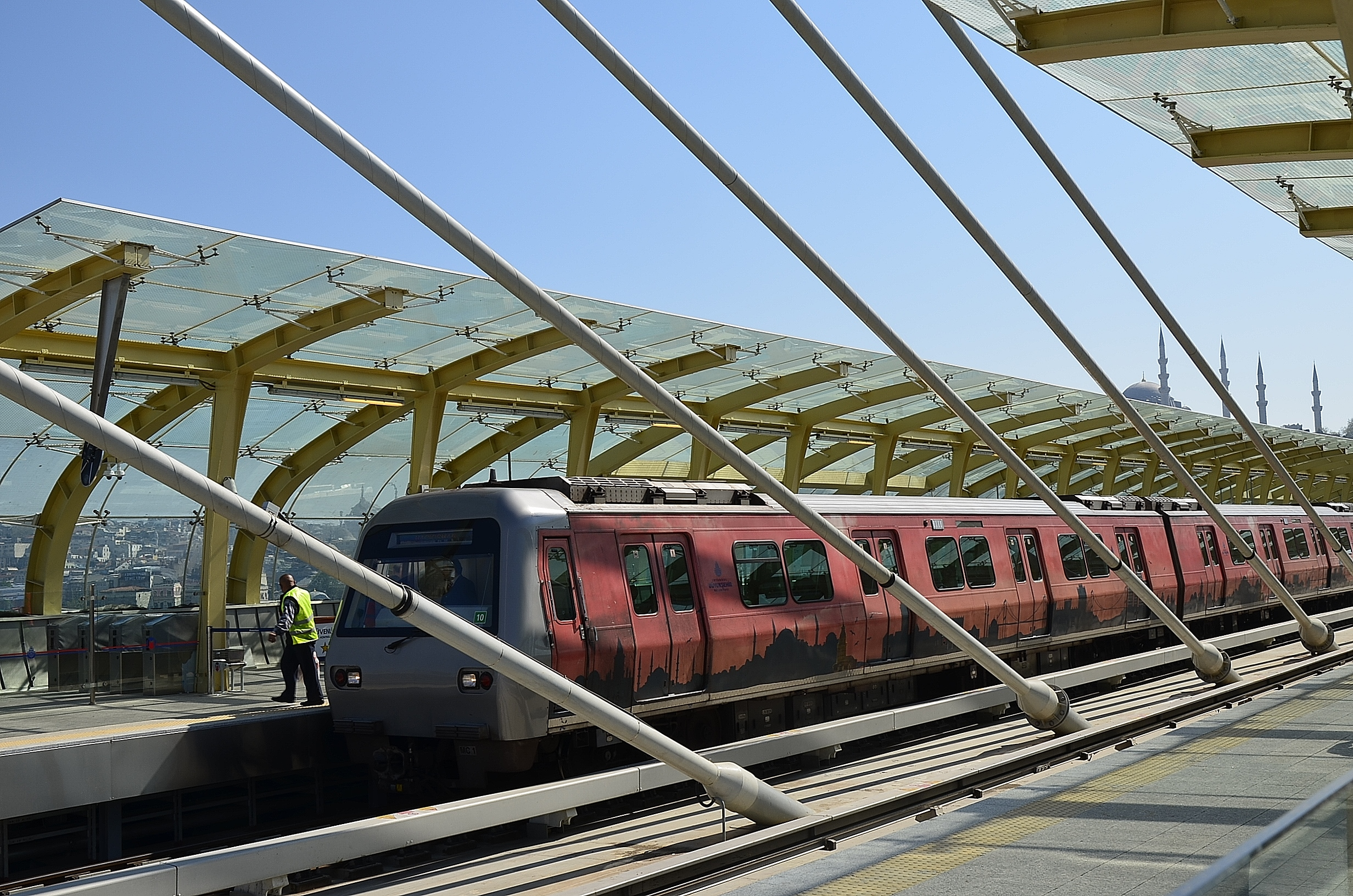
M2 rolling stock at Haliç station (2009 Rotem)

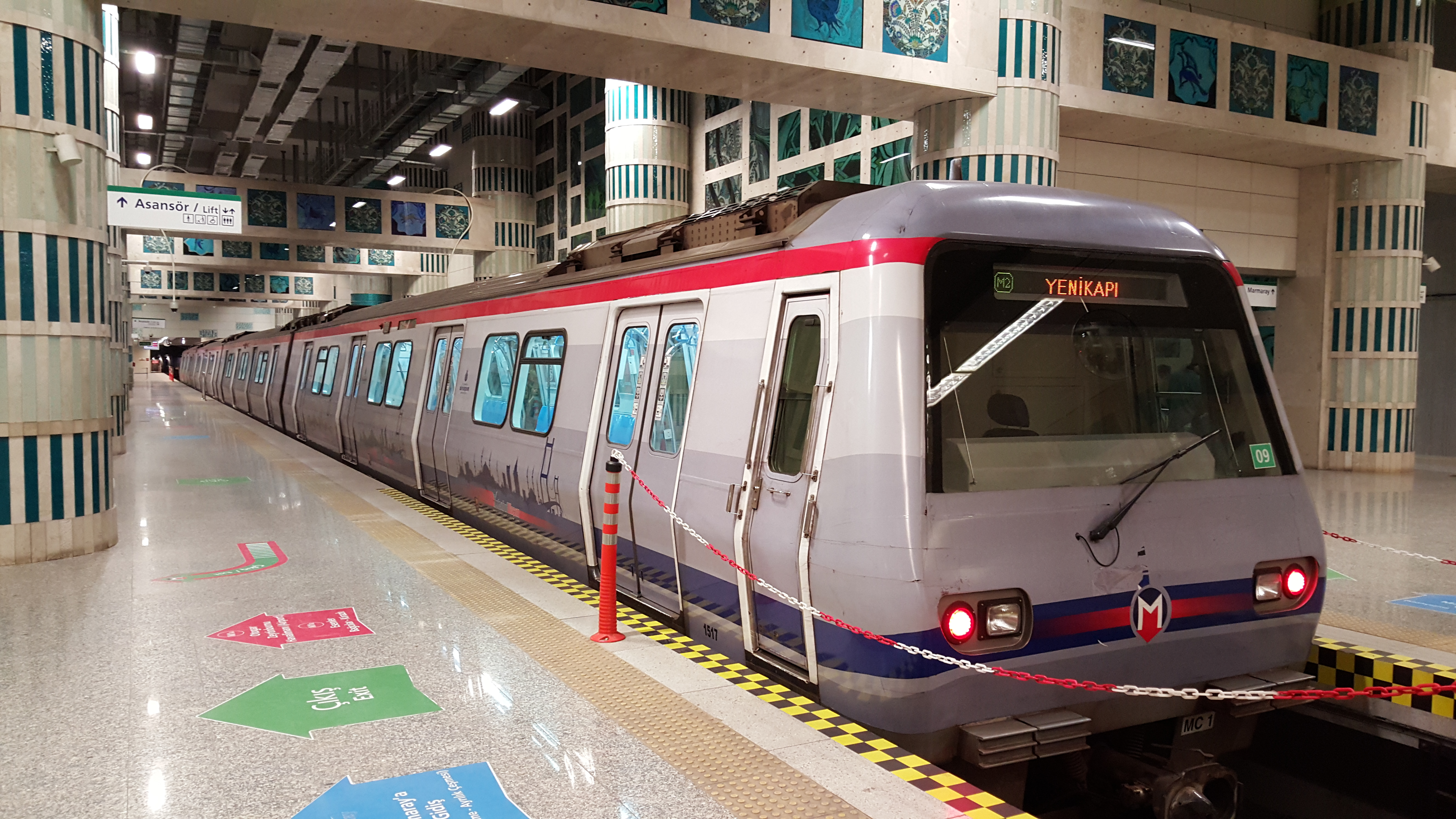
M2 rolling stock at Yenikapı station (2009 Rotem)

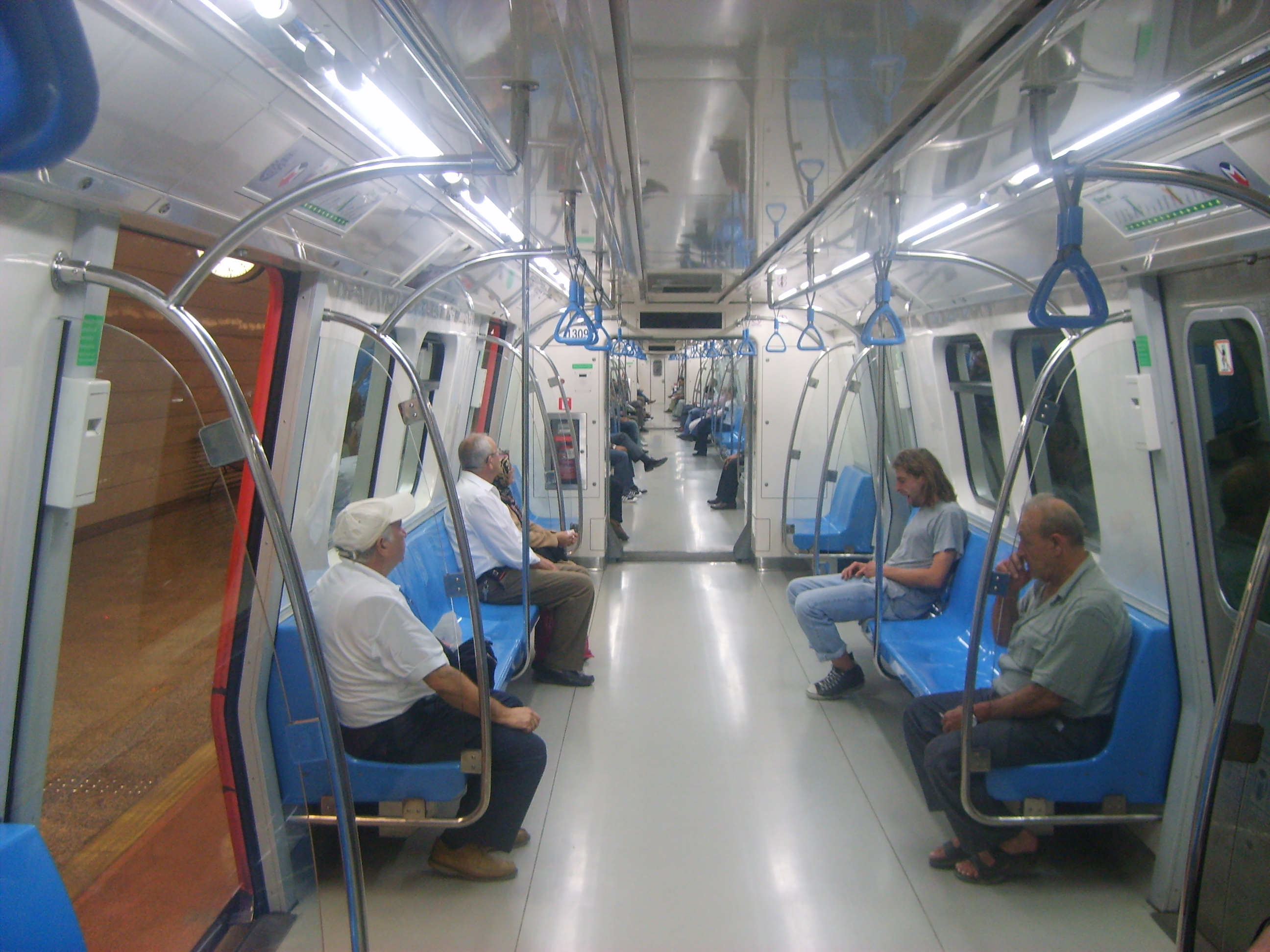
Interior of M2 rolling stock (2009 Rotem)

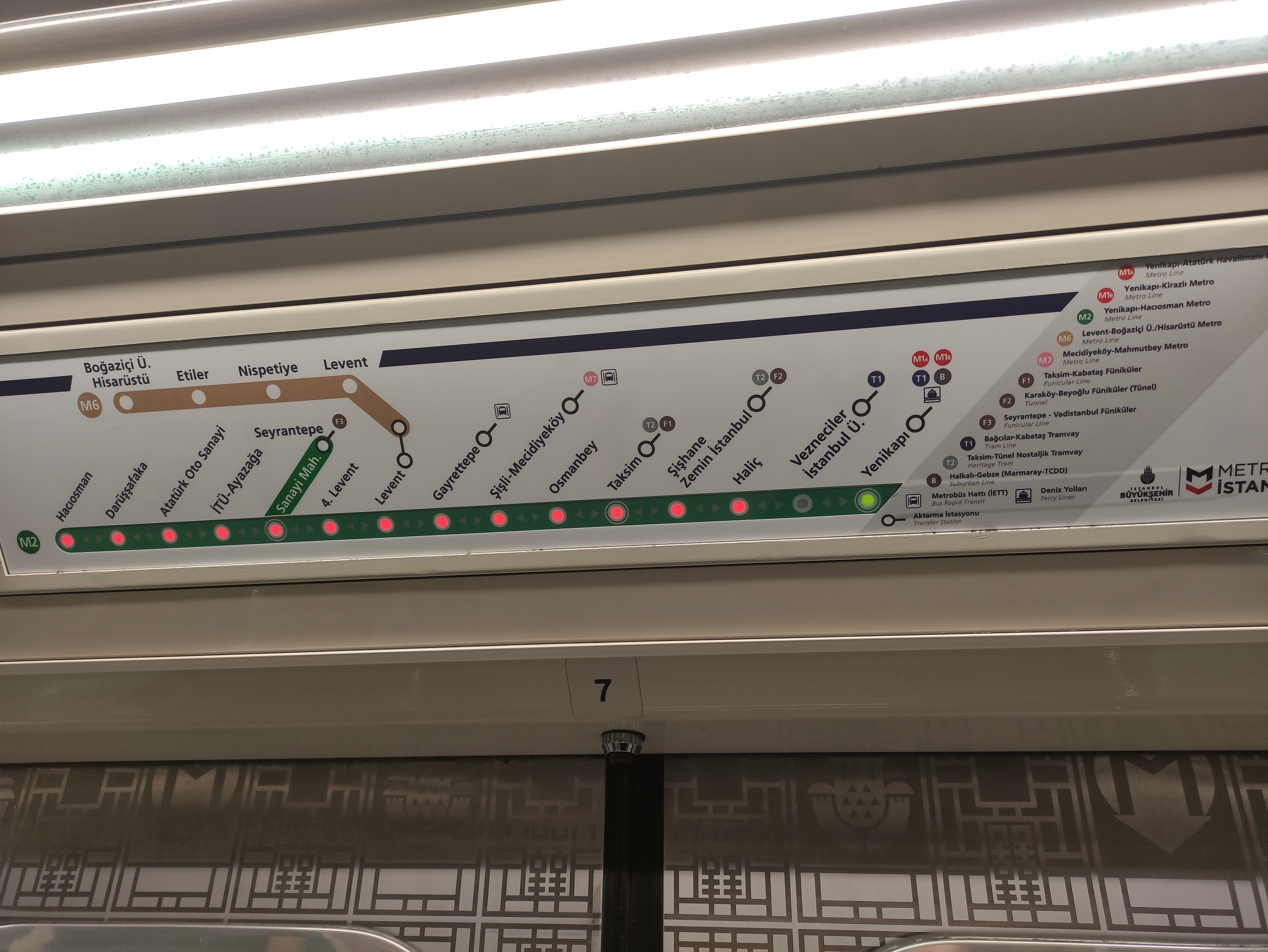
Route diagram of the M2 line (2009 Rotem)

==== M3 and M9 ====
The rolling stock on the M3 line, consists of 68 Alstom Metropolis AM4 (similar-looking vehicles are used at M4 Budapest Metro) units. Some of them are also used on the M9 Ataköy-Olimpiyat metro line.

==== M4 ====
Line M4 uses CAF and Bozankaya rolling stock. Trains operate in 4-car sets and can couple to form 8-car trains.

==== M5 ====
Line M5 uses driverless 6-car CAF and M8 Rotem rolling stock.

==== M7 and M8 ====
Line M7 uses driverless Hyundai Rotem rolling stock. Trains are made of 4-car units and can couple to form 8-car trains, although these are not currently used. Line M8 uses very similar trains, but only as 4-car sets.

==== M11 ====
Line M11 uses CRRC rolling stock.

== Future extensions ==
As part of the Istanbul Metropolitan Municipality goal of expanding the size of the city rail transportation network to 630 km (390 mi) by 2030, the Istanbul Metro has several lines that are under construction or planned. Since the city does not have a widespread railway network, the Metropolitan Municipality aims to connect urban areas of the city that do not have access to the Marmaray with metro lines.

Due to the city's unique geography and depth of the Bosporus which divides the city, none of the current Istanbul Metro lines cross the strait; lines are wholly located either on the European side or the Asian side of the city. In 2019, The Ministry of Transport and Infrastructure began the planning of a 30.2 km (18.8 mi) line that would link İncirli with Söğütlüçeşme via a tunnel under the Bosphorus also designed to accommodate road traffic.

The following metro lines are under construction:

| Line | Route | Length | Stations | Notes |
|---|---|---|---|---|
| M1 (Istanbul Metro) | Kirazlı ↔ Halkalı Üniversite | 6.2 km (under construction) | 5 (under construction) | Opening in 18 August 2029 |
| M4 (Istanbul Metro) | Tavşantepe ↔ Kaynarca Merkez | 1.1 km (under construction) | 1 (under construction) | Opening in 19 May 2027 |
| M7 (Istanbul Metro) | Kabataş ↔ Yıldız | 4.5 km (under construction) | 2 (under construction) | Opening in 27 December 2026 |
| M7 (Istanbul Metro) | Mahmutbey ↔ Hastane | 7.0 km (under construction) | 5 (under construction) | Opening in 27 December 2026 |
| M10 (Istanbul Metro) | Pendik Merkez ↔ Fevzi Çakmak | 4.9 km (under construction) | 2 (under construction) | Opening in 19 May 2027 |
| M12 (Istanbul Metro) | 60. Yıl Parkı ↔ Kazım Karabekir | 13.0 km (under construction) | 11 (under construction) | Opening on 19 December 2026 |
| M13 (Istanbul Metro) | Emek ↔ Yenidoğan | 6.6 km (under construction) | 5 (under construction) | Opening in 29 October 2028 |
| M14 (Istanbul Metro) | Altunizade ↔ Ümraniye Spor Köyü | 8.5 km (under construction) | 8 (under construction) | Opening in 30 April 2027 |
| TOTAL: | | 47.8 km (under construction) | 39 (under construction) | |

Construction of the following metro lines are planned or on hold:

| Line | Route | Length | Stations | Notes |
|---|---|---|---|---|
| M1 (Istanbul Metro) | Halkalı Üniversite ↔ Halkalı | 3.5 km (on hold) | 4 (on hold) | Line on hold |
| M2 (Istanbul Metro) | Yenikapı ↔ Sefaköy | 14 km (planned) | 10 (planned) | Line planned |
| M4 (Istanbul Metro) | Kaynarca Merkez ↔ İçmeler | ? km (on hold) | ? (on hold) | Line on hold |
| M7 (Istanbul Metro) | Hastane ↔ Esenyurt Meydanı | 11.1 km (on hold) | 6 (on hold) | Line on hold |
| M13 (Istanbul Metro) | Söğütlüçeşme ↔ Emek | 17.7 km (planned) | 10 (planned) | Line planned |
| M20 (Istanbul Metro) | Sefaköy ↔ TÜYAP | 18.5 km (planned) | 10 (planned) | Line planned |
| M34 (Istanbul Metro) | Beylikdüzü ↔ Gebze | 74.5 km (planned) | 19 (planned) | Line planned |

=== European side ===
Istanbul network with lines and extensions under construction

M1B metro line extension

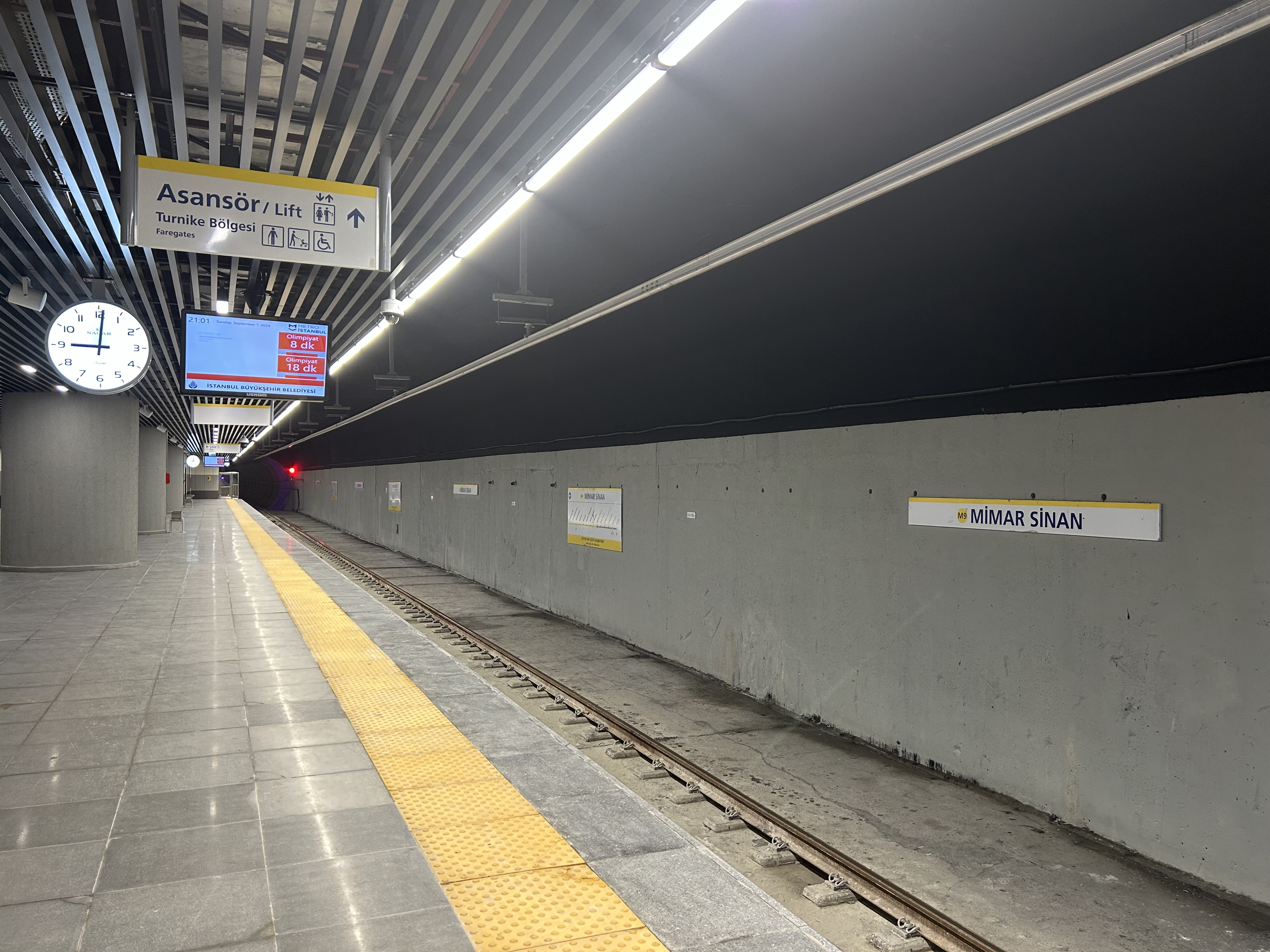
Mimar Sinan station

The M1B Kirazlı-Halkalı-Üniversite metro line extension is under construction. It will connect Kirazlı to Halkalı University and the M9 metro line. The extension will have 5 new stations and is expected to go into service in 2029. Due to difficulties in land acquisition, a further extension from Halkalı University to Halkalı railway station has not started yet.

1. Barbaros
2. Malazgirt
3. Mimar Sinan (M9 Line Interchange)
4. Fatih
5. Halkalı-Üniversite

M7 metro line extension

The M7 Kabataş-Yıldız metro line extension is under construction. The extension will have 2 new stations and is expected to go into service in 2028. It will interconnect with ferries at Beşiktaş and Kabataş stations, with T1 trams line at Kabataş station and with F1 funicular line at Kabataş station. The M7 Mahmutbey-Hastane extension will extend the line 5 stations west to Hastane, expected to enter service in 2028. Due to construction work for the Halkalı-Kapıkule high-speed railway impacting the alignment at Ispartakule, a further extension from Hastane to Esenyurt Meydan has not started yet.

(Kabataş-Yıldız)

1. Beşiktaş
2. Kabataş

(Mahmutbey-Hastane)

1. Bölge Parkı
2. Atatürk Mahallesi
3. Toplu Konutlar
4. Atakent Mahallesi
5. Hastane

=== Asian side ===
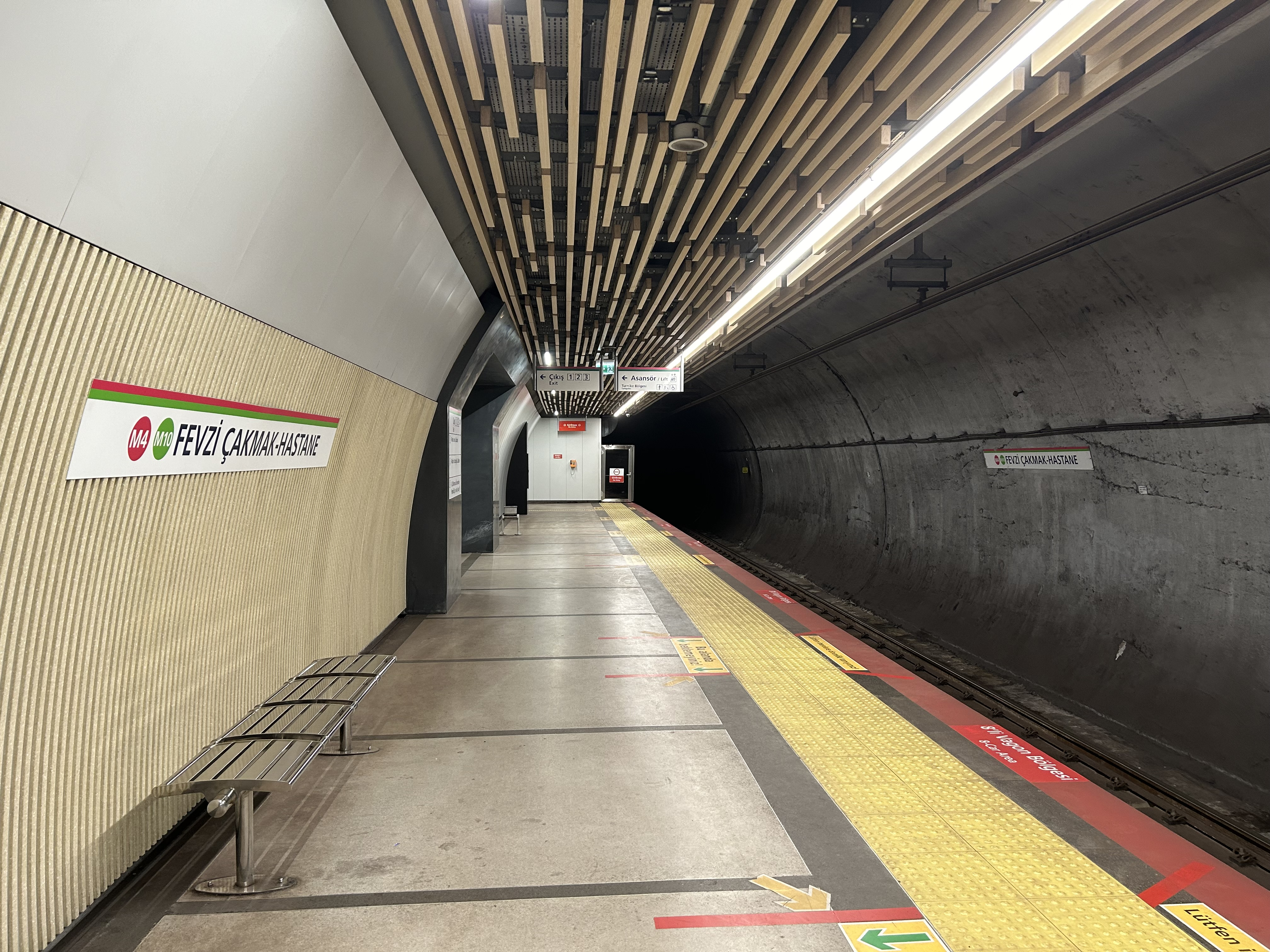
Fevzi Çakmak Hastane station

M4 metro line extension

M4 Kadıköy–İçmeler metro line extension is partially under construction. Planned opening date of Kaynarca Merkez is early 2027. Due to planning adjustments, construction between Kaynarca Merkez and İçmeler has not started yet.

1. Kaynarca Merkez (M10 Line Interchange)

M10 metro line

The M10 Pendik Merkez-Sabiha Gökçen Airport Metro Line will connect Sabiha Gökçen Airport with Pendik railway station and the Marmaray. Planned opening date is early 2027.

1. Pendik Merkez (Marmaray Interchange)
2. Kaynarca Merkez (M4 Line Interchange)

M12 metro line

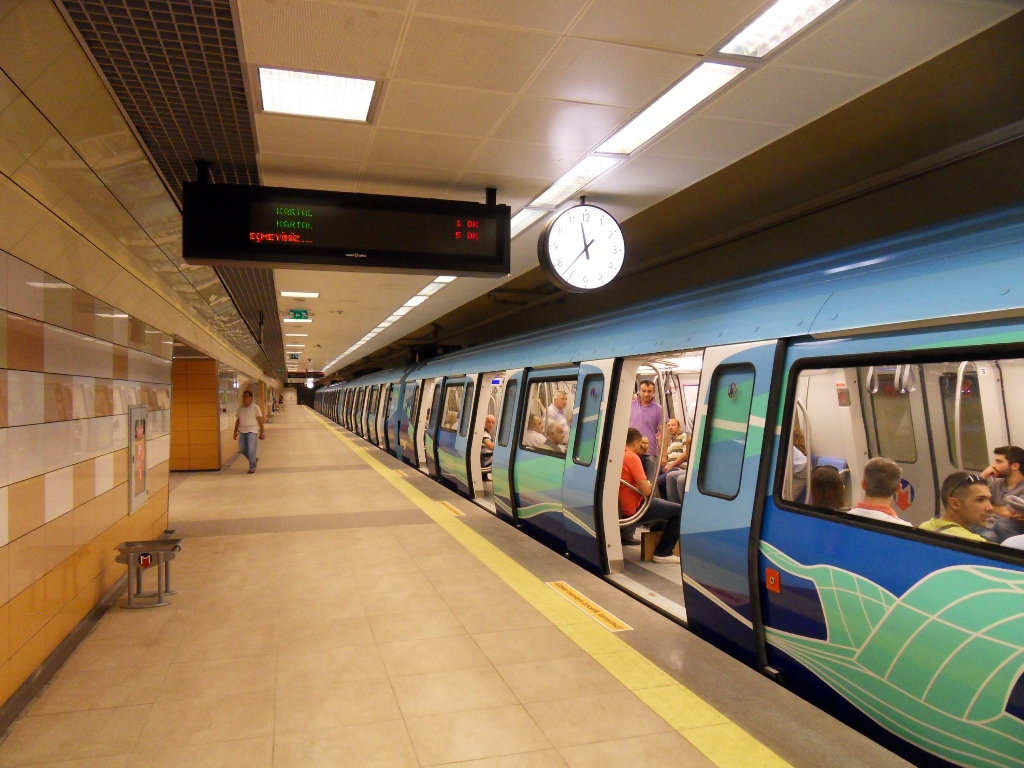
Yenisahra station

The M12 60. Yıl Parkı-Kazım Karabekir Metro Line will connect the underserved Ataşehir district with the regional centres of densely populated Ümraniye and integrate those districts into the Istanbul rapid rail system. Planned opening date is 19 December 2026.

1. 60. Yıl Parkı
2. Tütüncü Mehmet Efendi (Marmaray Interchange)
3. Sahrayıcedit
4. Yenisahra (M4 Line Interchange)
5. Ataşehir
6. Finans Merkezi
7. Site
8. Atakent
9. Çarşı (M5 Line Interchange)
10. SBÜ Hastanesi
11. Kazım Karabekir

M13 metro line

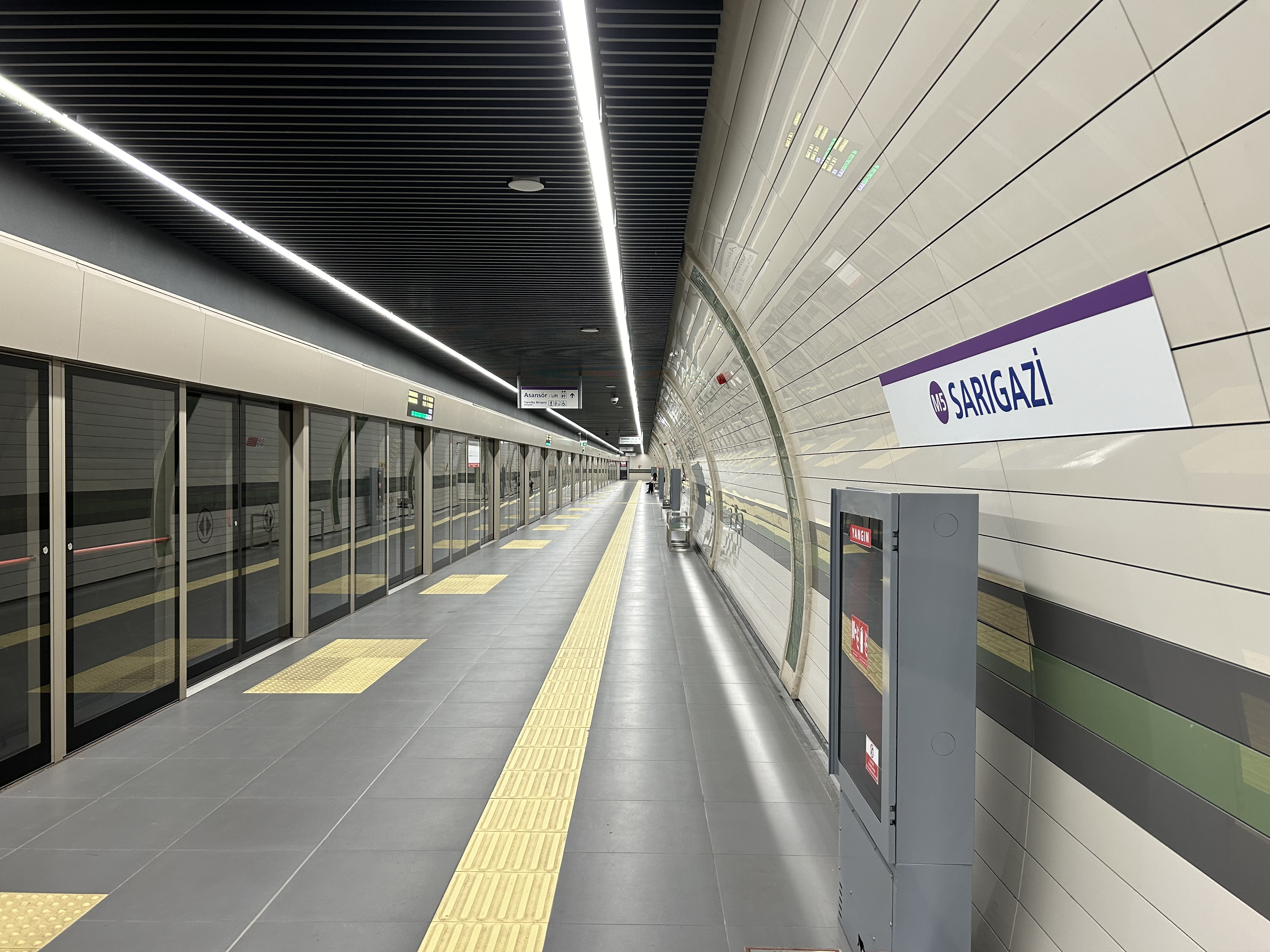
Sarıgazi station

The M13 Emek-Yenidoğan Metro Line will connect the northeastern pockets of Çekmeköy to the M5 metro line and Sancaktepe City Hospital. Planned opening date is 2026.

1. Emek
2. Sarıgazi (M5 Line Interchange)
3. Aydınlar
4. Cumhuriyet
5. Yenidoğan

M14 metro line

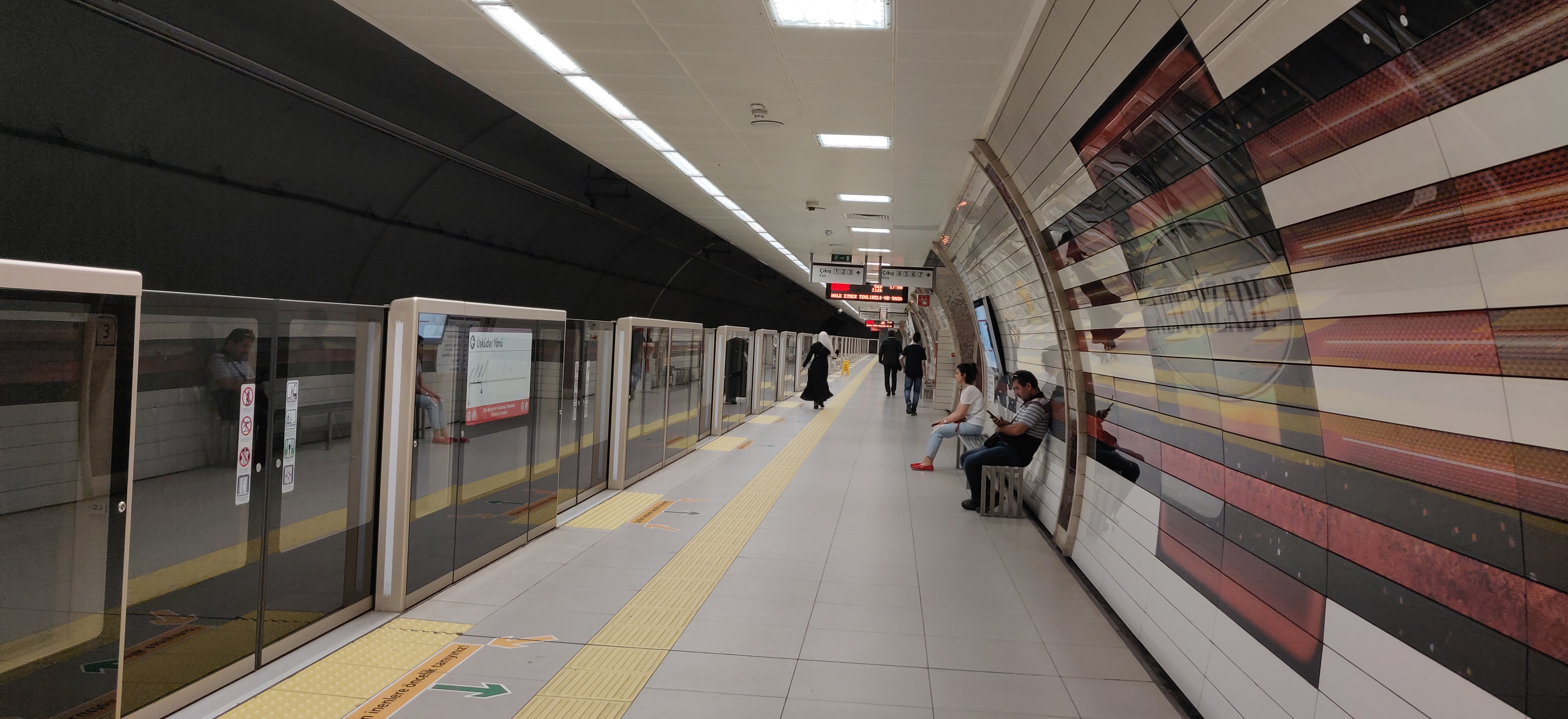
Altunizade station

The M14 Altunizade-Bosna Bulvarı Metro Line will serve the Çamlıca Hill, Çamlıca Mosque and Bosna Boulevard and will connect the M5 metro line. Planned opening date is April 2027.

1. Altunizade (M5 Interchange)
2. Ferah Mahallesi
3. Çamlıca Camii
4. Bosna Bulvarı

== Network overview ==
Metro, suburban rail, tram, funicular, ropeway and Metrobus (as of June 2026):

- In operation: 476.55 km / 370 stations
- Under construction: 47.8 km / 35 stations
- Planned: ? km / ? stations
- Sum: ? km / ? stations

| | | | In operation | | | | Under construction (new lines or extensions) | | | In planning, on hold, or in revision | | |
| | Line | Length | Opening Date | Length (km) | Stat. | Notes | Length (km) | Stat. | Notes | Length (km) | Stat. | Notes |
| Metro | Line M1 | Yenikapı ↔ Atatürk Airport | 3 September 1989 | 19.9 | 18 | Shared tracks between Yenikapı ↔ Otogar | | | | | | |
| Metro | Line M1 | Yenikapı ↔ Kirazlı | 14 June 2013 | 15.4 | 13 | Shared tracks between Yenikapı ↔ Otogar | 6.2 | 5 | Kirazlı ↔ Halkalı Üniversite | 3.5 | 4 | Halkalı Üniversite ↔ Halkalı |
| Metro | Line M2 | Yenikapı ↔ Hacıosman | 16 September 2000 | 23.49 | 16 | 1.8 km branch to Seyrantepe | | | | | 5 | Yenikapı ↔ İncirli |
| Metro | Line M2 | Yenikapı ↔ Hacıosman | 16 September 2000 | 23.49 | 16 | 1.8 km branch to Seyrantepe | | | | 5.7 | 3 | Hacıosman ↔ Sarıyer |
| Metro | Line M2 | Yenikapı ↔ Hacıosman | 16 September 2000 | 23.49 | 16 | 1.8 km branch to Seyrantepe | | | | | 3 | Seyrantepe ↔ Çırçır |
| Metro | Line M3 | Bakırköy Sahil ↔ Kayaşehir Merkez | 14 June 2013 | 26.7 | 20 | | | | | | | |
| Metro | Line M4 | Kadıköy ↔ Gökçen Airport | 17 August 2012 | 33.5 | 23 | | | | | 4.8 | 3 | Gökçen Airport ↔ Kurtköy YHT |
| Metro | Line M4 | Kadıköy ↔ Gökçen Airport | 17 August 2012 | 33.5 | 23 | | 1.1 | 1 | Tavşantepe ↔ Kaynarca Merkez | 6.8 | 7 | Kaynarca Merkez ↔ İçmeler / Tuzla Sahil |
| Metro | Line M5 | Üsküdar ↔ Sultanbeyli | 15 December 2017 | 30.9 | 24 | | | | | 5.2 | 4 | Sultanbeyli ↔ Kurtköy YHT |
| Metro | Line M6 | Levent ↔ Boğaziçi Üniversitesi | 19 April 2015 | 3.3 | 4 | | | | | | | |
| Metro | Line M7 | Yıldız ↔ Mahmutbey | 28 October 2020 | 20.0 | 17 | | 4.5 | 2 | Yıldız ↔ Kabataş | | | |
| Metro | Line M7 | Yıldız ↔ Mahmutbey | 28 October 2020 | 20.0 | 17 | | 7.0 | 5 | Mahmutbey ↔ Hastane | 11.1 / 16.5 | 6 / 10 | Hastane ↔ Esenyurt Meydan / Saadetdere |
| Metro | Line M8 | Bostancı ↔ Parseller | 6 January 2023 | 14.27 | 13 | | | | | | | |
| Metro | Line M9 | Olimpiyat ↔ Ataköy | 29 May 2021 | 17.2 | 14 | | | | | | | |
| Metro | M10 (Istanbul Metro) | Pendik Merkez ↔ Gökçen Airport | - | | | | 4.9 | 2 | Pendik Merkez ↔ Fevzi Çakmak | 4.8 | 3 | Gökçen Airport ↔ Kurtköy YHT |
| Metro | M11 (Istanbul Metro) | Gayrettepe ↔ Halkalı | 22 January 2023 | 69.0 | 15 | operated by TCDD | | | | | | |
| Metro | M12 (Istanbul Metro) | 60. Yıl Parkı ↔ Kazım Karabekir | - | | | | 13.0 | 11 | | | | |
| Metro | M13 (Istanbul Metro) | Söğütlüçeşme ↔ Yenidoğan | - | | | | 6.6 | 5 | Emek ↔ Yenidoğan | 18.0 | 10 | Söğütlüçeşme ↔ Emek |
| Metro | M14 (Istanbul Metro) | Altunizade ↔ Bosna Bulvarı | - | | | | 4.5 | 4 | | | | |
| Subtotal: | | | | 273.66 | 177 | | 47.8 | 35 | | ? | ? | |
| Suburban Rail | Marmaray | Halkalı ↔ Gebze | 29 October 2013 | 76.6 | 43 | operated by TCDD | | | | | | |
| Suburban Rail | Haydarpaşa-Gebze Line | Halkalı ↔ Bahçeşehir | 23 May 2022 | 13.5 | 3 | operated by TCDD | | | | | | |
| Subtotal: | | | | 90.1 | 46 | | | | | | | |
| Tramway | Line T1 | Kabataş ↔ Bağcılar | 13 June 1992 | 19.3 | 31 | | | | | | | |
| Tramway | Line T2 | Taksim ↔ Tünel | 29 December 1990 | 1.6 | 5 | operated by IETT | | | | | | |
| Tramway | Line T3 | Kadıköy-Moda ring line | 1 November 2003 | 2.6 | 11 | | | | | | | |
| Tramway | Line T4 | Topkapı ↔ Mescid-i Selam | 12 September 2007 | 15.3 | 22 | | | | | | | |
| Tramway | Line T5 | Eminönü ↔ Alibeyköy Cep | 1 January 2021 | 10.1 | 14 | | | | | | | |
| Tramway | Line T6 | Kazlıçeşme ↔ Sirkeci | 26 February 2024 | 8.394 | 8 | operated by TCDD | | | | | | |
| Subtotal: | | | | 57.294 | 91 | | | | | | | |
| Funicular | Line F1 | Taksim ↔ Kabataş | 30 June 2006 | 0.6 | 2 | | | | | | | |
| Funicular | Line F2 | Beyoğlu ↔ Karaköy | 17 January 1875 | 0.6 | 2 | operated by IETT | | | | | | |
| Funicular | Line F3 | Vadistanbul ↔ Seyrantepe | 29 October 2017 | 0.8 | 2 | | | | | | | |
| Funicular | Line F4 | Rumeli Hisarüstü ↔ Aşiyan | 28 October 2022 | 0.8 | 2 | | | | | | | |
| Subtotal: | | | | 2.8 | 8 | | | | | | | |
| Ropeway | Maçka Gondola | Maçka ↔ Taşkışla | 11 April 1993 | 0.3 | 2 | | | | | | | |
| Ropeway | Eyüp Gondola | Eyüp ↔ Pierre Loti | 30 November 2005 | 0.4 | 2 | | | | | | | |
| Subtotal: | | | | 0.7 | 4 | | | | | | | |
| BRT | Metrobus (Istanbul) | TÜYAP ↔ Söğütlüçeşme | 17 September 2007 | 52.0 | 44 | operated by IETT | | | | | | |
| Subtotal: | | | | 52.0 | 44 | | | | | | | |
| TOTAL | | | | 476.55 | 370 | | 47.8 | 35 | | ? | ? | |

== See also ==
- Istanbul nostalgic tramways
- Metrobus (Istanbul)
- Ferries in Istanbul
