= Sarıgazi station =

Station of the Istanbul Metro

Sarıgazi
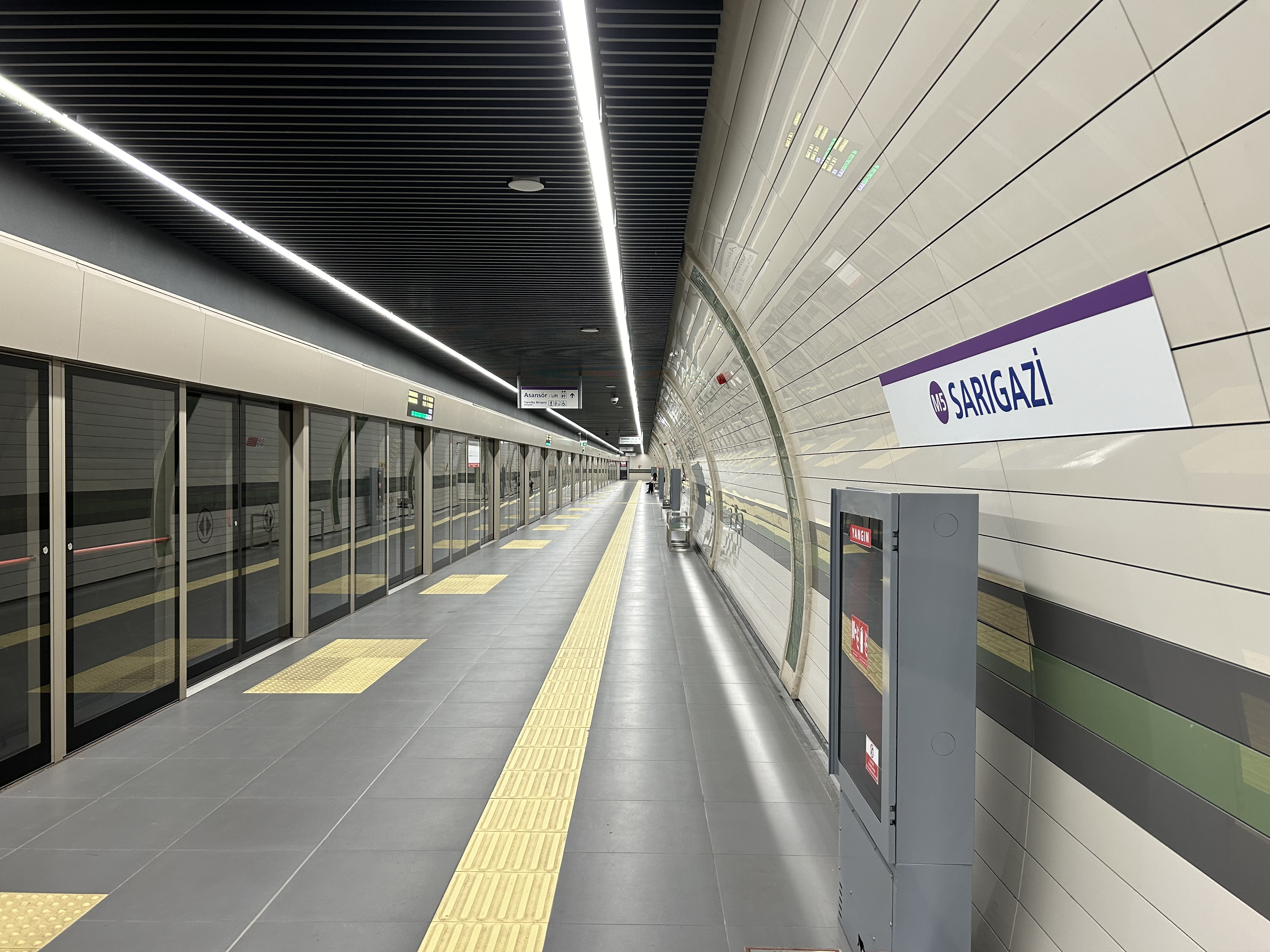
- Platform

General information
- Location: Inönü Neighborhood, Eski Ankara Street, Nazım Hikmet Park, 34785; Sancaktepe, Istanbul; Turkey
- Coordinates: 41°0′36″N 29°12′45″E
- System: Istanbul Metro rapid transit station
- Owner: Istanbul Metropolitan Municipality
- Operator: Istanbul Metro
- Line: M5
- Platforms: 1 Island platform
- Tracks: 2
- Connections: İETT Bus: 11, 11SA, 11V, 11ÜS, 14, 14YK, 19A, 19EK, 19S, 19SB, 122H, 122V, 131, 131A, 131B, 131C, 131H, 131K, 131Y, 131Ü, 132YM, 522B, 522ST, 622, UM60, UM61, UM73; Istanbul Minibus: Dudullu - Yenidoğan - Sancaktepe, Dudullu - Madenler, Sultanbeyli - Dudullu

Construction
- Structure type: Underground
- Parking: No
- Cycle facilities: Yes
- Accessible: Yes

History
- Opened: 16 March 2024 (2 years ago)
- Electrified: 1,500 V DC Overhead line

Services
Preceding station	Istanbul Metro	Following station
Meclis towards Üsküdar	M5 Line	Sancaktepe Şehir Hastanesi towards Sultanbeyli
Location

Sarıgazi is an underground station on the M5 line of the Istanbul Metro. It is located under Eski Ankara Street at Nazım Hikmet Park in the Inönü neighborhood of Sancaktepe. It was opened on 16 March 2024 with the M5 line extension from Çekmeköy to Samandıra Merkez.

There is an entrance at Ankara Street at the station (Entrance 1). Entrance 2 will be located in the form of a pedestrian tunnel on Atatürk Street near the Sancaktepe District Governorship building and is currently being built with the M13 line. There are 6 elevators ('lifts' on station signage) and 10 escalators in the station.

Since it has a station structure integrated with the M5 station, some of the platforms of the M13 line are being built within the scope of M5 construction.

== History ==
On 10 August 2021, the first of the TBMs, which started excavation from Sancaktepe Station in January, reached Sarıgazi with the Sarıgazi Station TBM Transition Ceremony of the Çekmeköy - Sultanbeyli Metro, which was held by the Istanbul Metropolitan Municipality. The first TBM completed the excavation in the TBM Shaft near Çekmeköy Station in January 2022.

On 3 December 2021, TBM-2 reached Sarıgazi Station and completed the TBM excavation. On 4 May 2023, the first test drive was carried out with the test train departing from Çekmeköy, heading to Meclis and Sarıgazi stations, the electrification of which was completed.

== Station layout ==
Platform level	Westbound	← toward Üsküdar (Meclis)
Platform level	Island platform, doors will open on the left
Platform level	Eastbound	toward Sultanbeyli (Sancaktepe Şehir Hastanesi) →

== Operation information ==
The line operates between 06:00 and 00:00 with a train frequency of 4 minutes and 40 seconds during peak hours and 7 minutes at all other times. The line also operates night metro services between 00:00 and 06:00 on Saturdays and Sundays, with trains running every 30 minutes. This provides 66 hours of uninterrupted service between Friday and Sunday. During these hours, fares are charged at double the price. During this time, only Entrance 1 is open at this station.

== Gallery ==
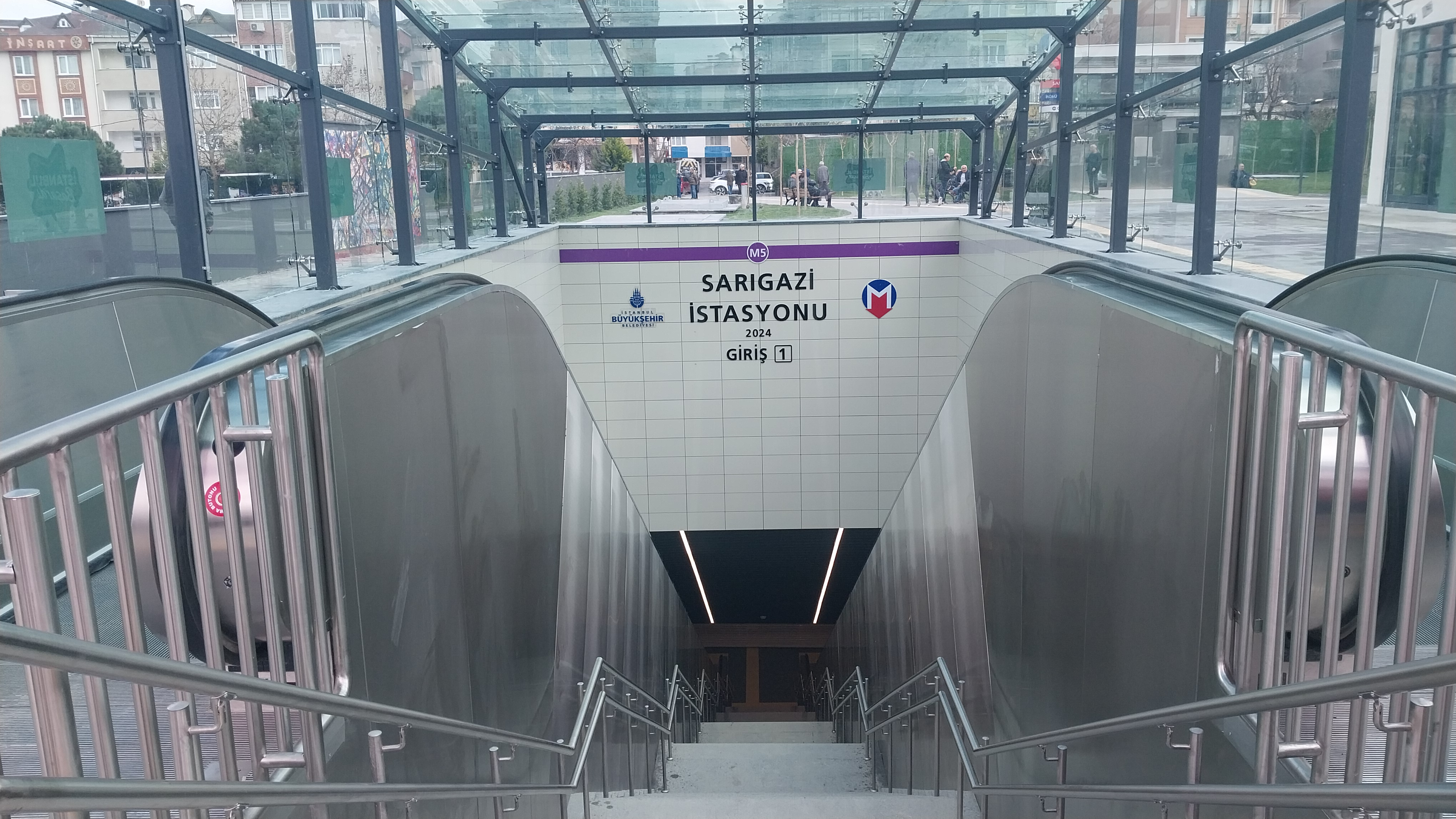
Entrance 1

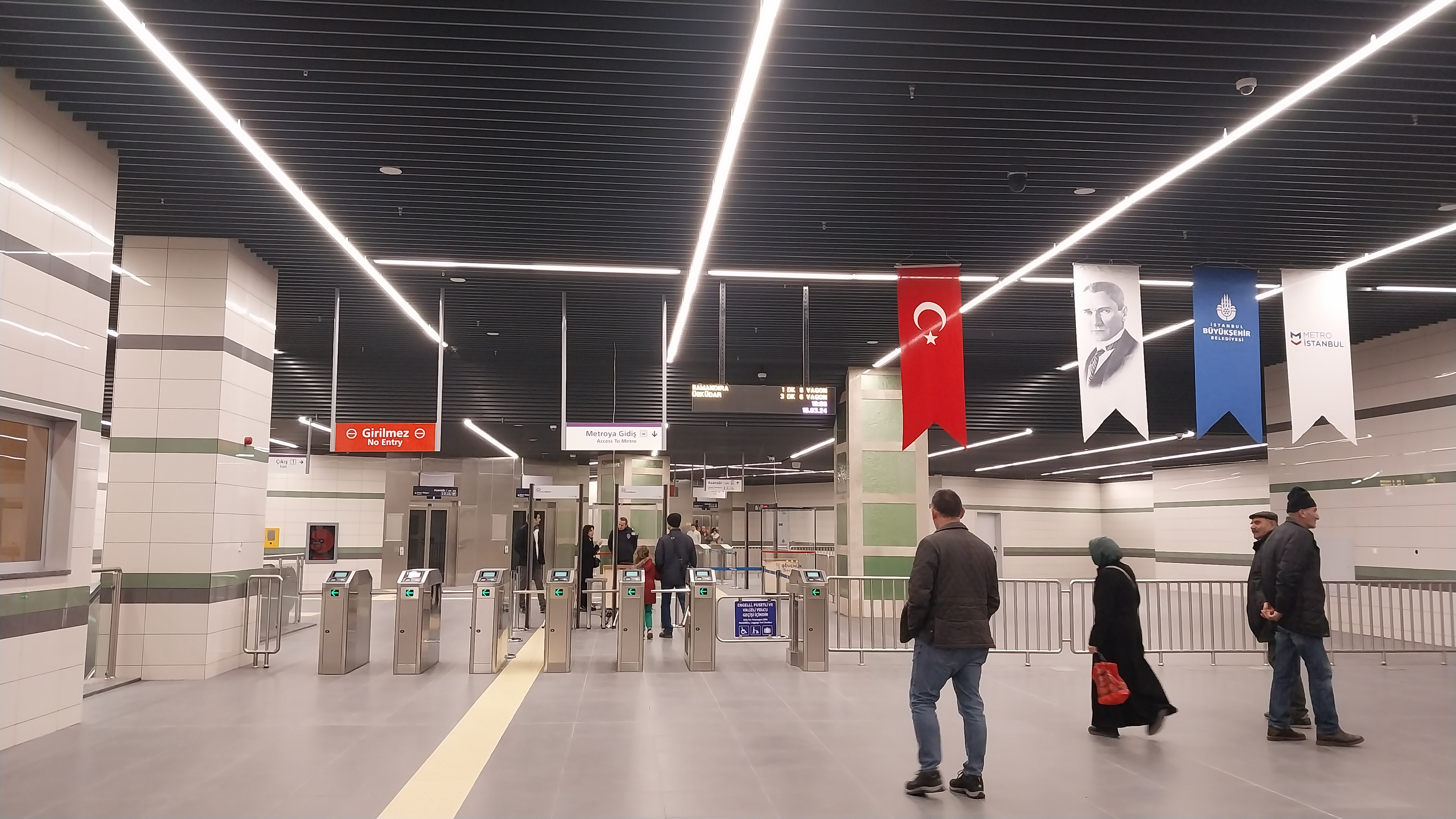
Ticket hall

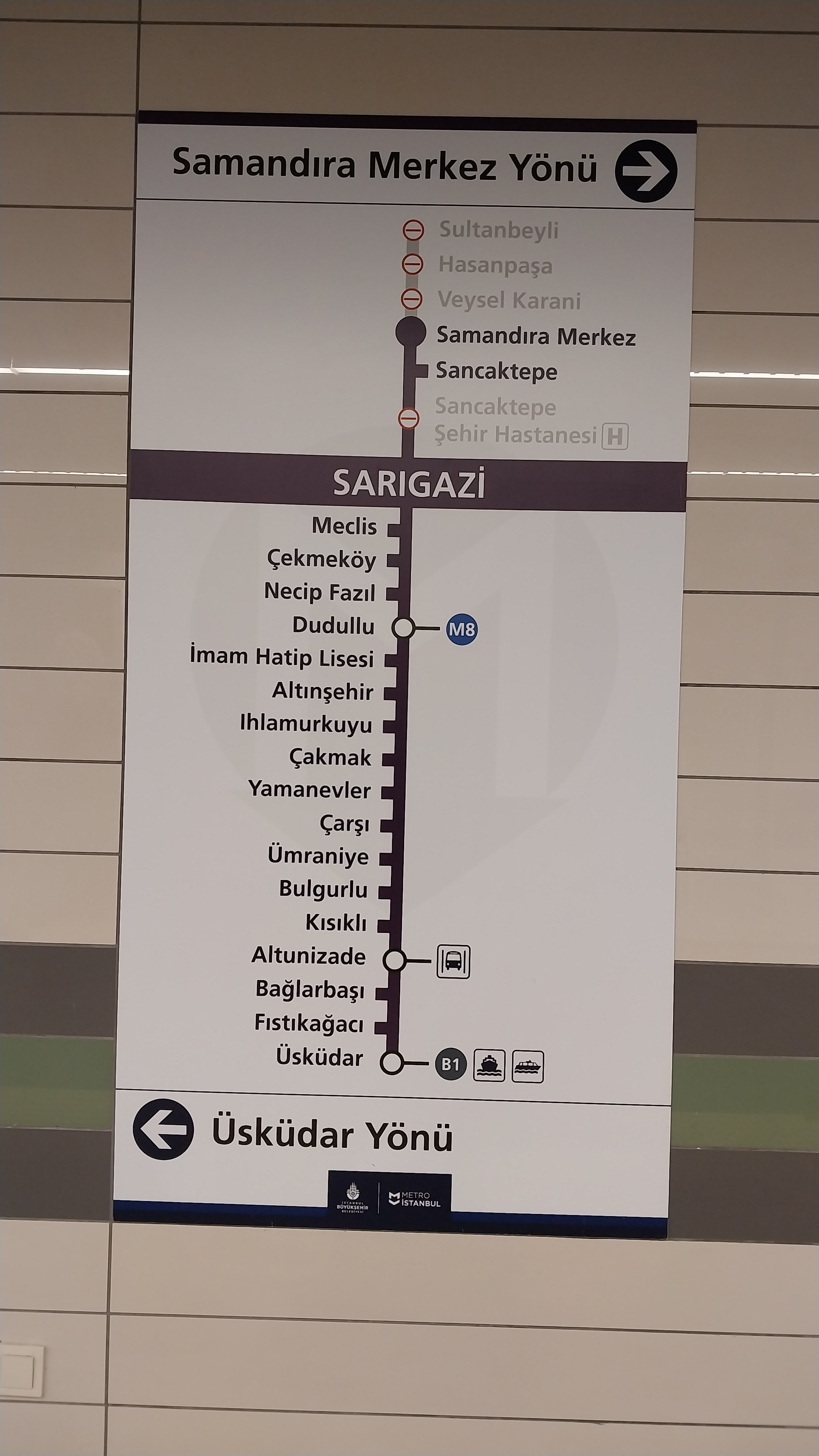
Line diagram

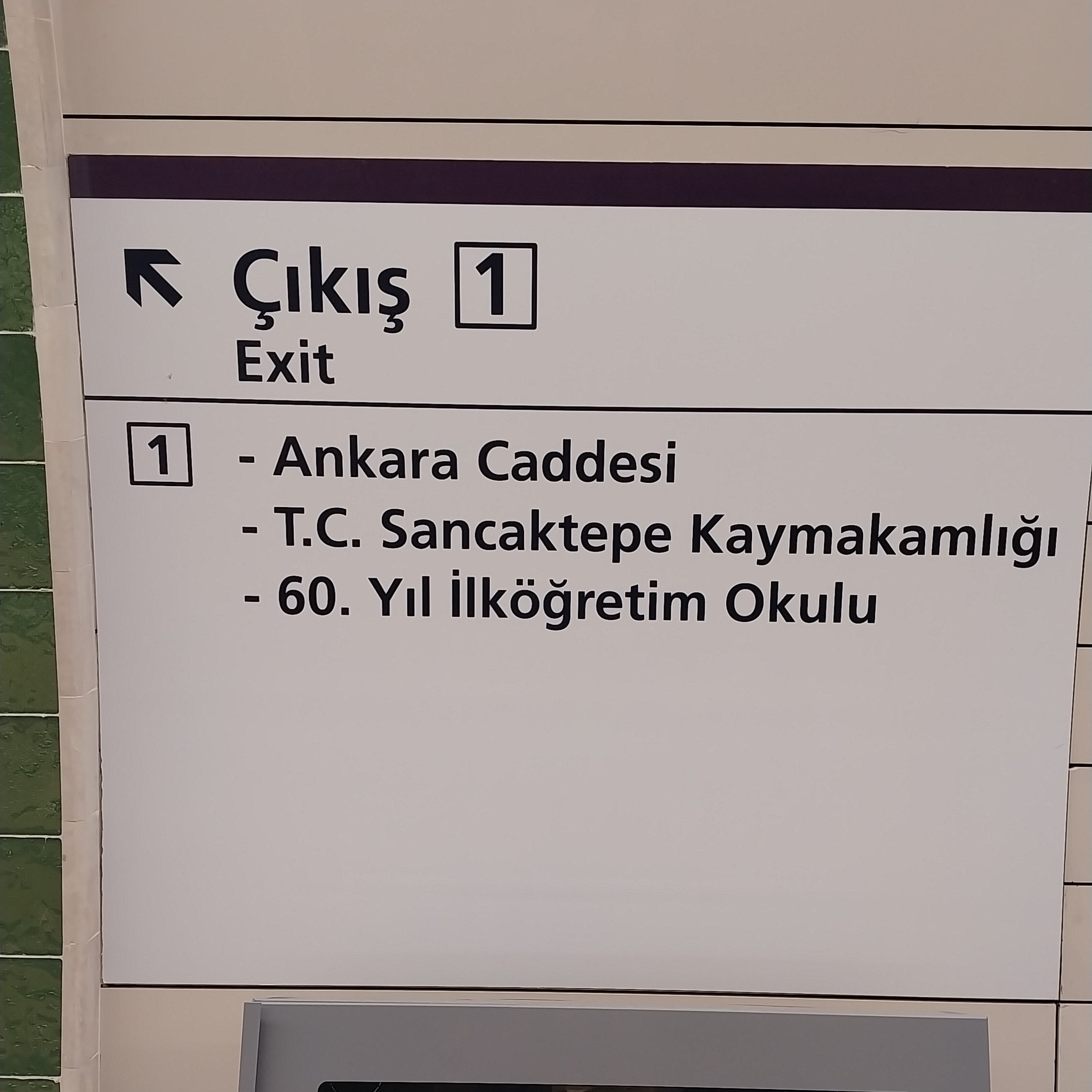
Exit sign

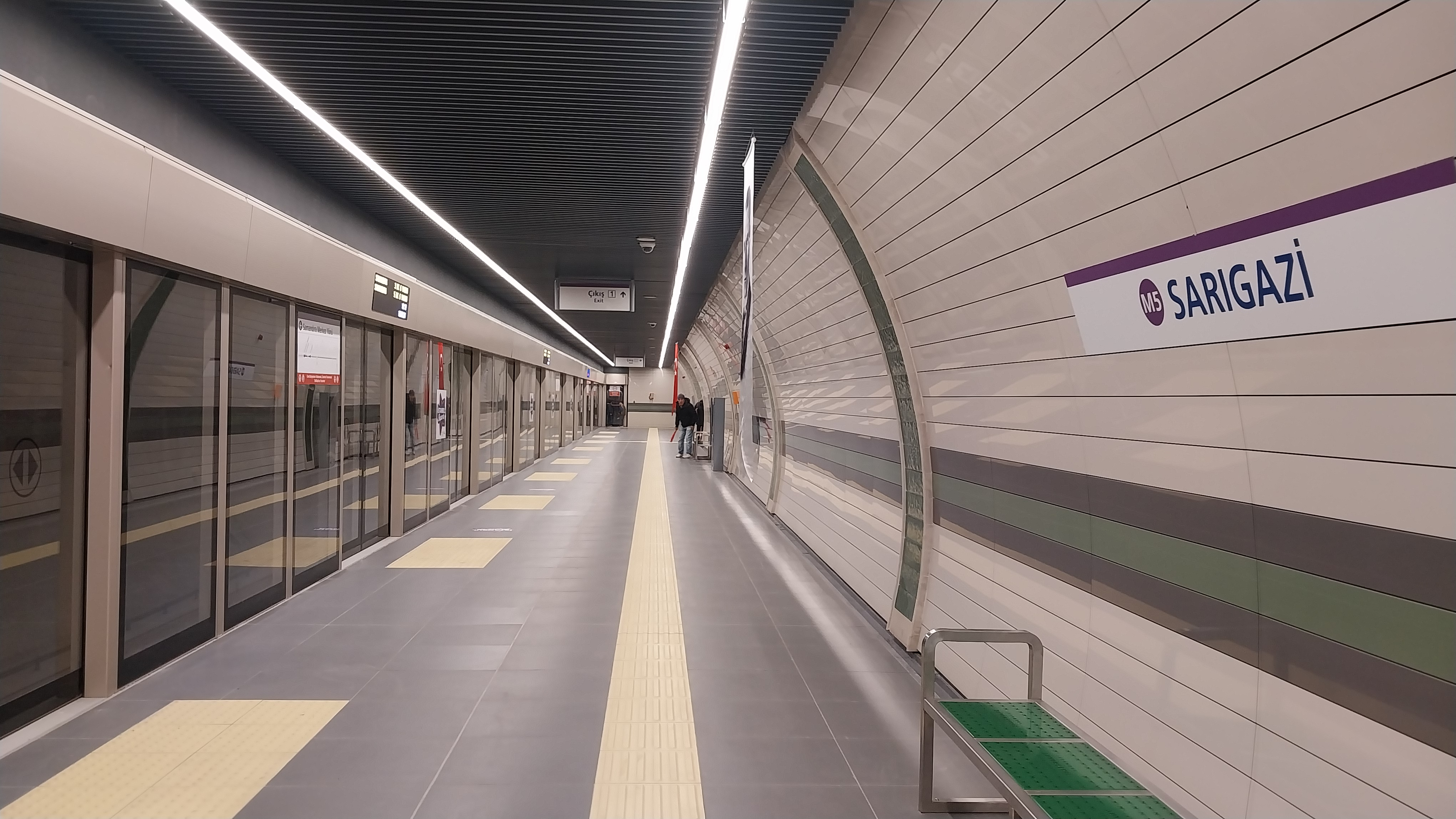
Platform
