= Sancaktepe Şehir Hastanesi station =

Station of the Istanbul Metro

Sancaktepe Şehir Hastanesi (Sancaktepe City Hospital)
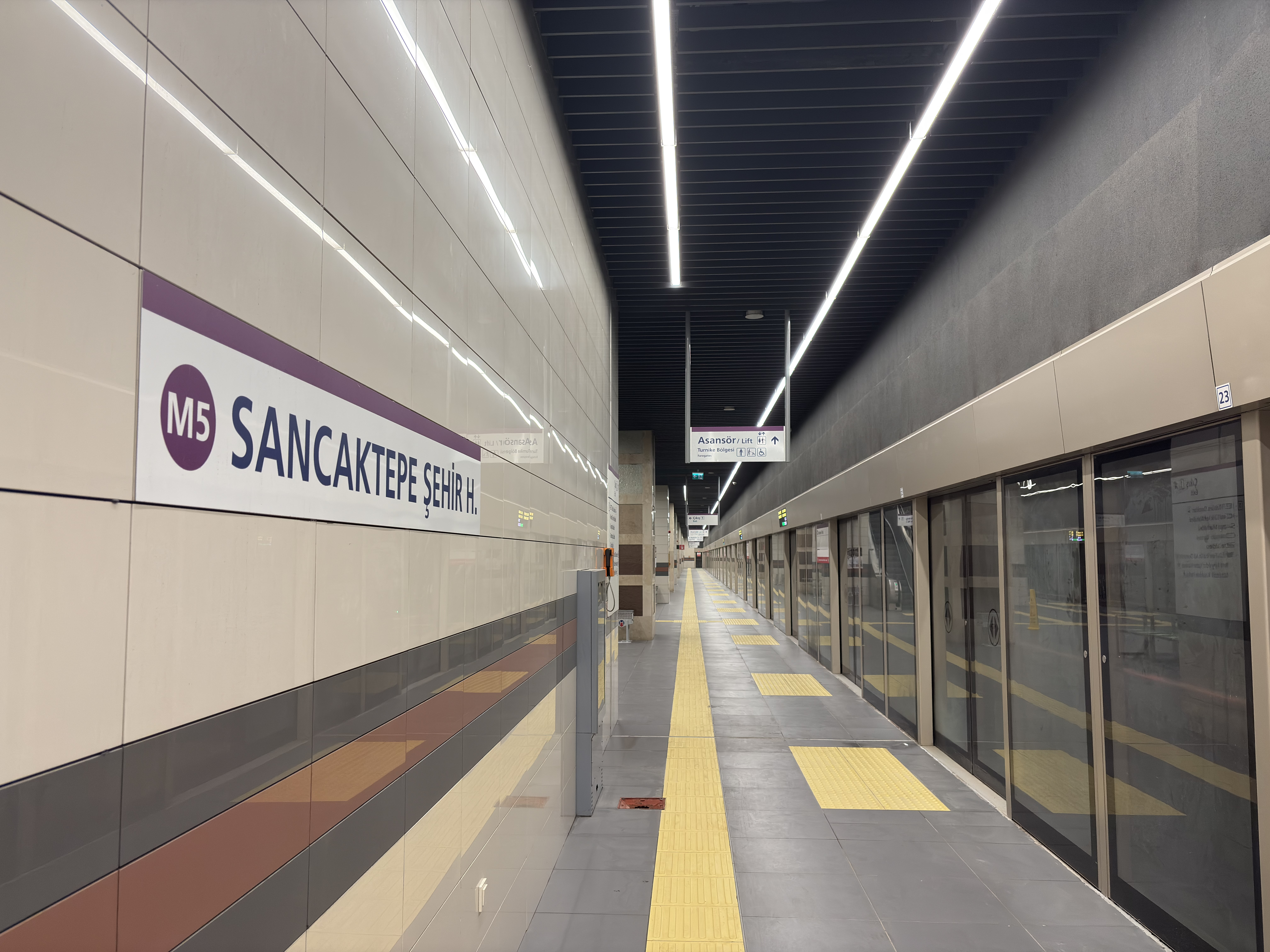
- Platform

General information
- Location: Sarıgazi Neighborhood, Osmangazi Street, 34785; Sancaktepe, Istanbul; Turkey
- Coordinates: 41°0′5″N 29°13′2″E
- System: Istanbul Metro rapid transit station
- Owner: Istanbul Metropolitan Municipality
- Operator: Istanbul Metro
- Line: M5
- Platforms: 1 Island platform
- Tracks: 2
- Connections: İETT Bus: 11ÜS, 14S, 19SB, 19V, 122H, 122V, 131, 131A, 131C, 131H, 131Ü, 132S, 132YB, 132ÇK, 522ST, UM73, ÇM44; Istanbul Minibus: Dudullu - Sultanbeyli, Dudullu - Viaport

Construction
- Structure type: Underground
- Parking: 336 spaces
- Accessible: Yes

History
- Opened: 22 May 2026 (3 months ago)
- Electrified: 1,500 V DC Overhead line

Services
Preceding station	Istanbul Metro	Following station
Sarıgazi towards Üsküdar	M5 Line	Sancaktepe towards Sultanbeyli
Location

Sancaktepe Şehir Hastanesi (Sancaktepe City Hospital) is an underground station on the M5 line of the Istanbul Metro. It is located under Osmangazi Street in the Sarıgazi neighborhood of Sancaktepe. Due to difficulties in station construction, it opened on 22 May 2026, later than the rest of the Çekmeköy to Samandıra Merkez extension.

There is an open-close scissor structure in the station, and there will be a fully mechanical automatic parking lot with a capacity of 336 vehicles on the upper floors of this truss structure. In this way, it will be possible to travel with the Park-and-Ride system.

== History ==
The Çekmeköy - Sultanbeyli Metro Line Second TBM Excavation Ceremony was held on 15 January 2021 for TBM-2, which started excavation during January 2021 from Sancaktepe to Çekmeköy. According to the statement of Pelin Alpkökin, Head of the Istanbul Metropolitan Municipality Rail System Department, in April 2021, the first TBM had to pass under the station due to difficult ground conditions during the station excavation. In accordance with this unusual method, the TBM segments were broken while the station excavation is completed.

== Station layout ==
Platform level	Westbound	← toward Üsküdar (Sarıgazi)
Platform level	Island platform, doors will open on the left
Platform level	Eastbound	toward Sultanbeyli (Sancaktepe) →

== Operation information ==
The line operates between 06:00 and 00:00 with a train frequency of 4 minutes and 40 seconds during peak hours and 7 minutes at all other times. The line also operates night metro services between 00:00 and 06:00 on Saturdays and Sundays, with trains running every 30 minutes. This provides 66 hours of uninterrupted service between Friday and Sunday. During these hours, fares are charged at double the price.

== Gallery ==
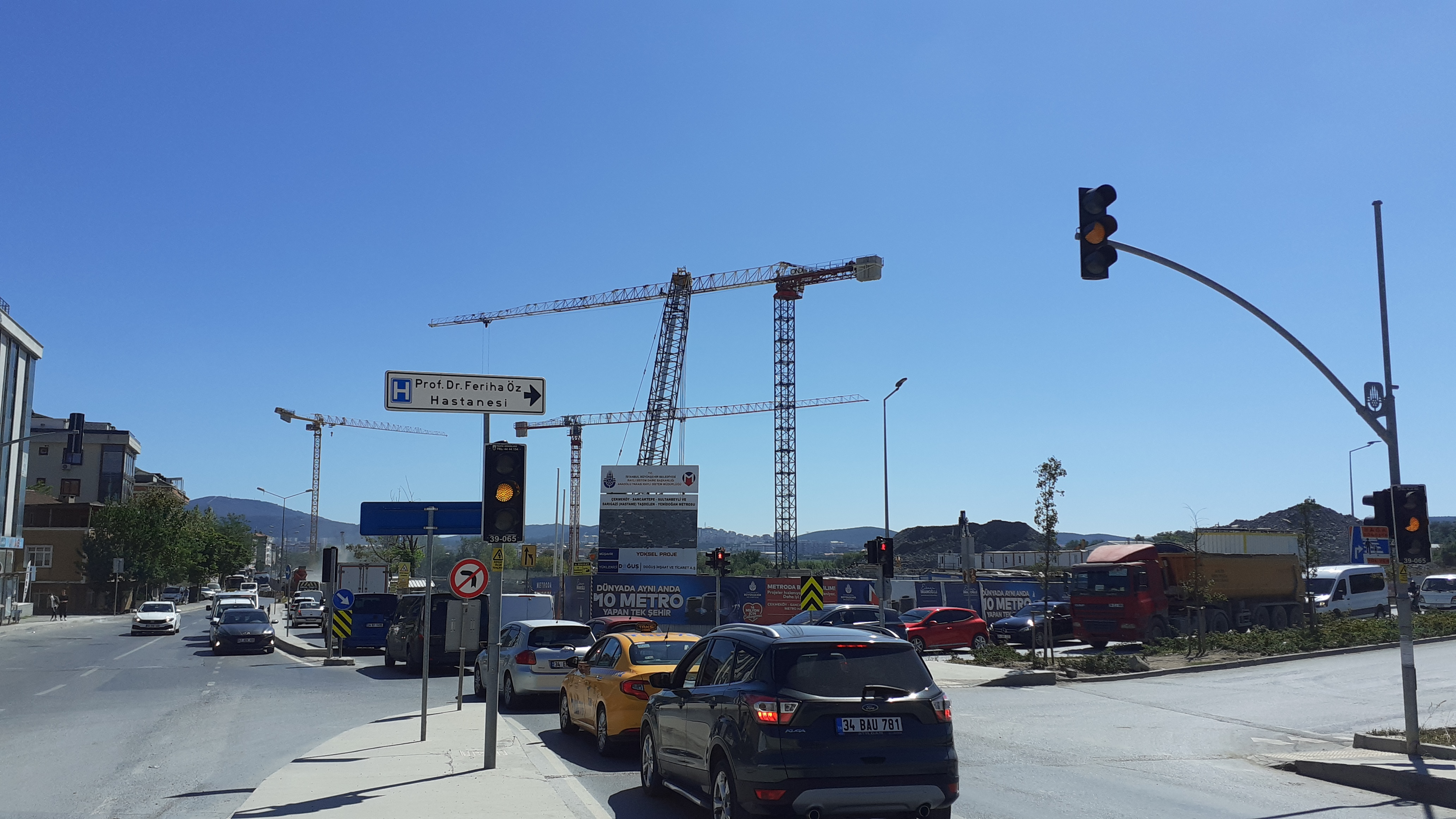
Construction site of the station in August 2022

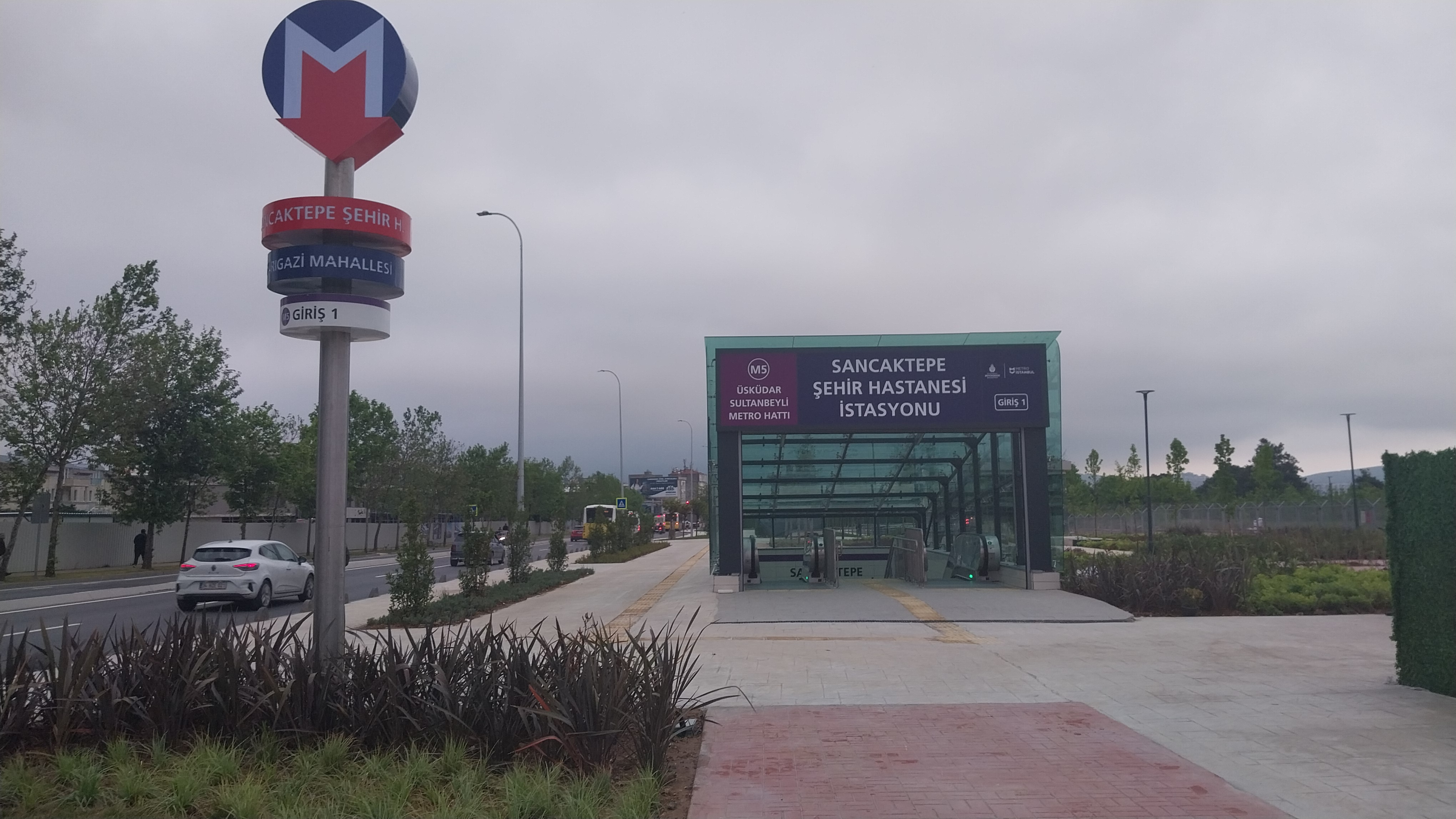
Entrance structure with totem

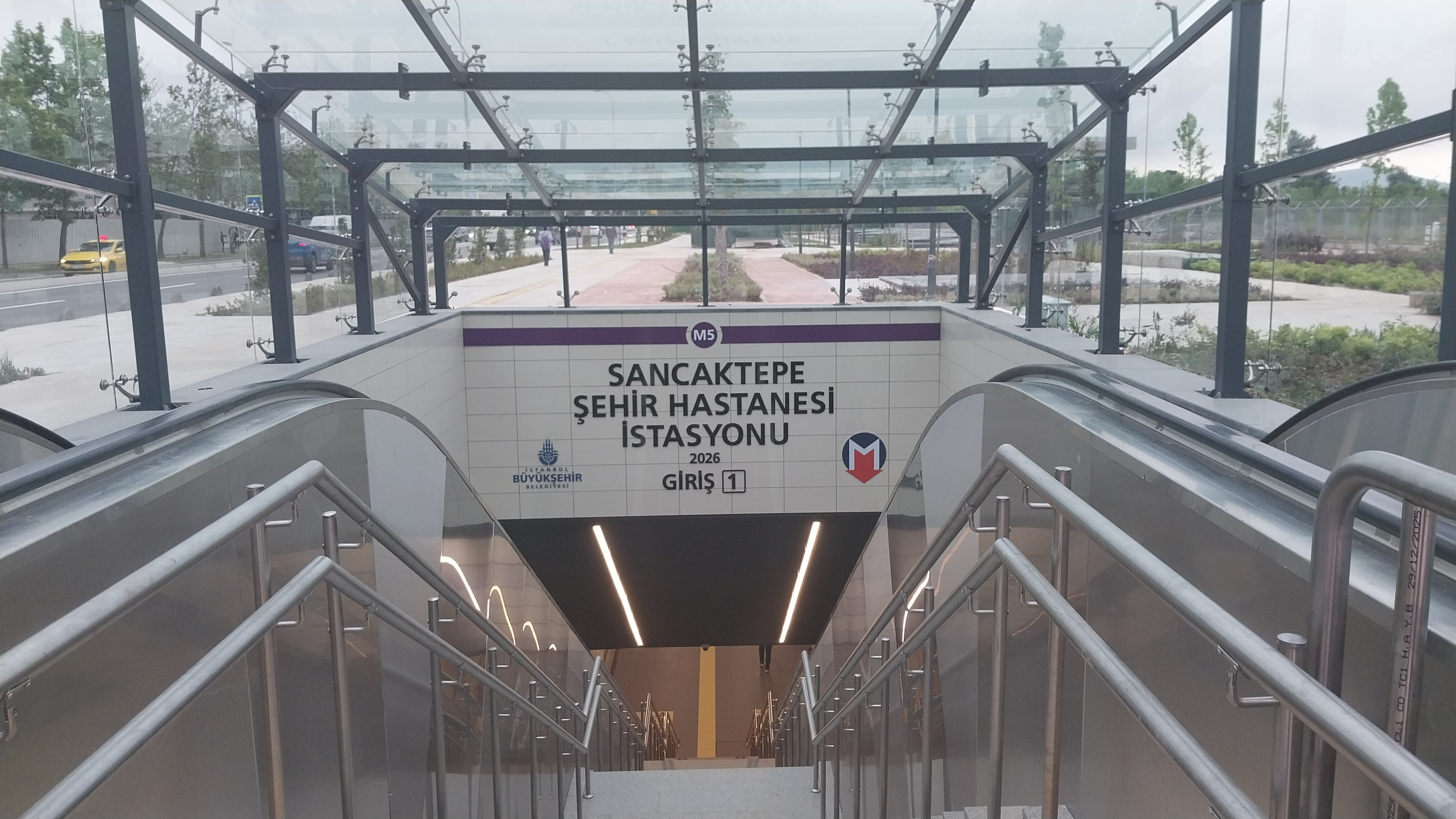
Entrance 1

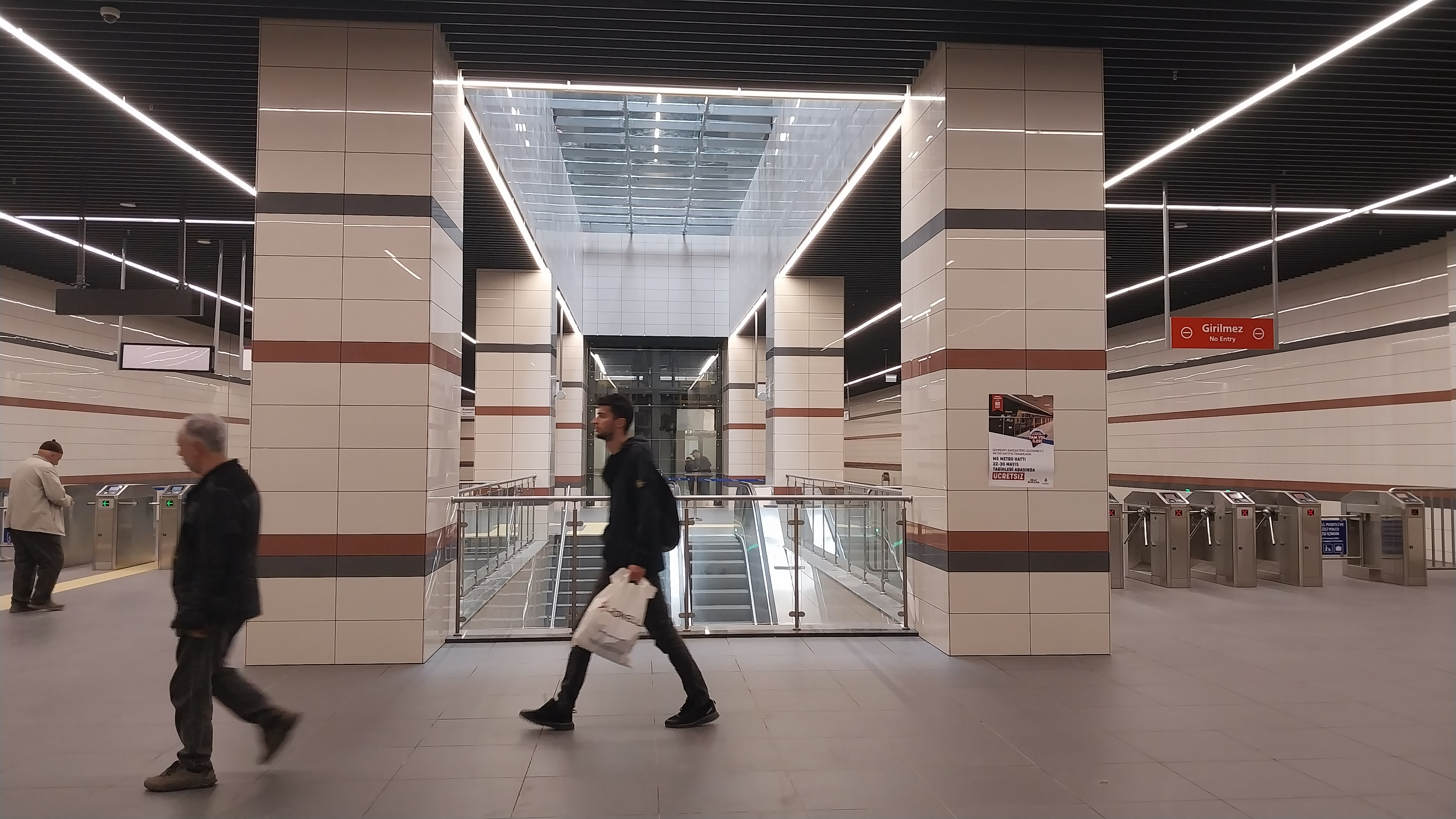
Ticket hall

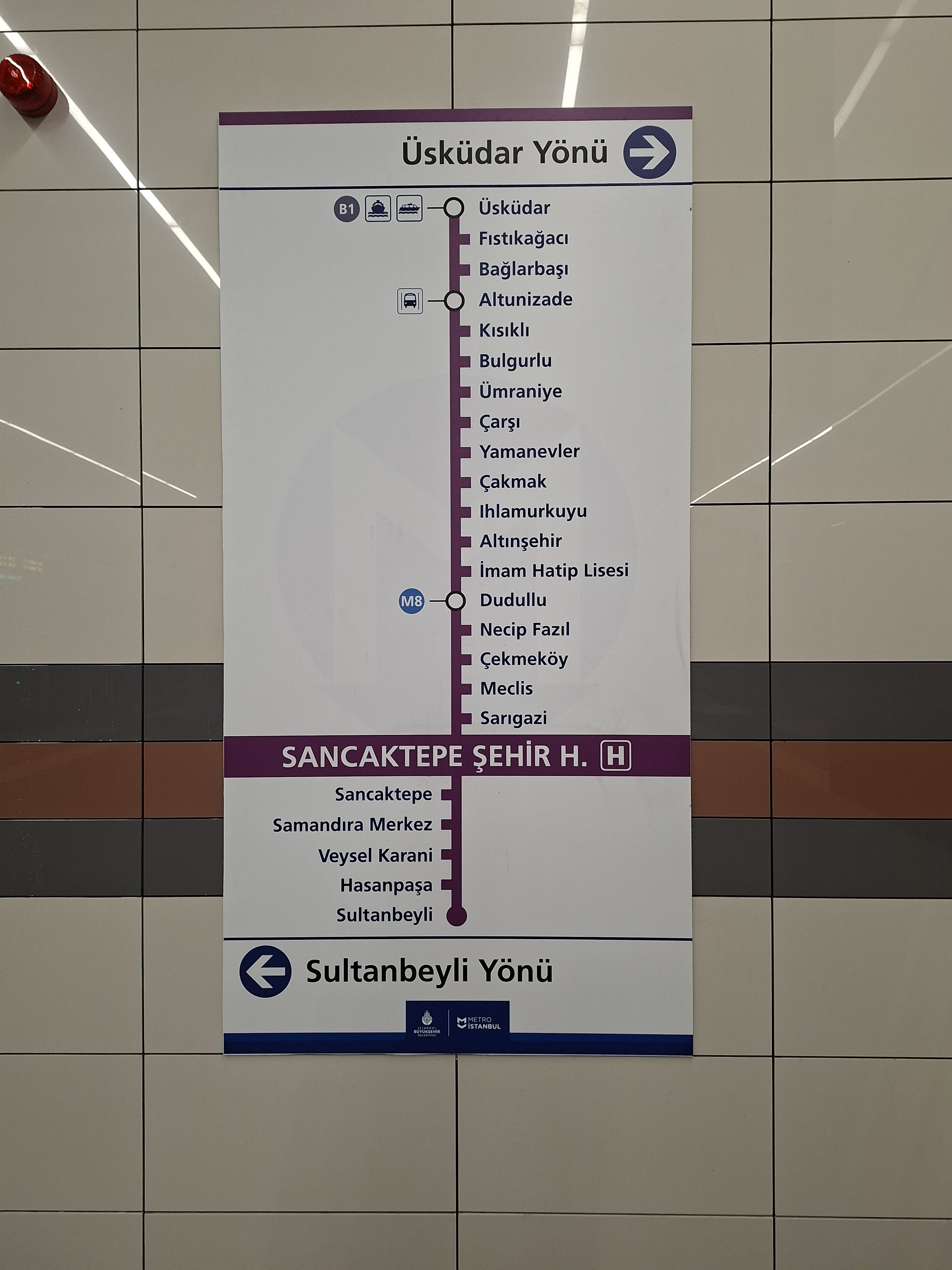
Route map

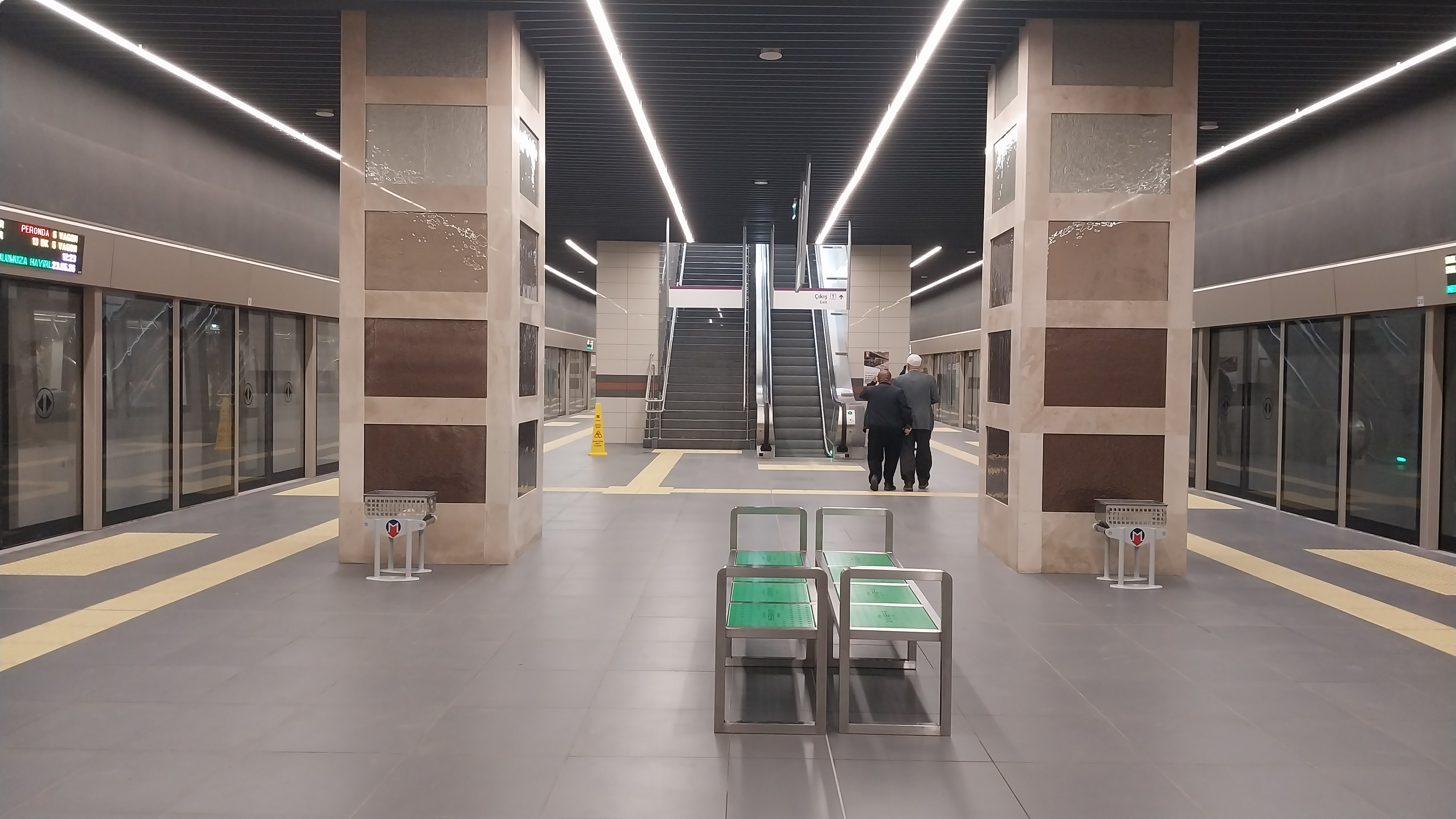
Platform width
