= Meclis station =

Station of the Istanbul Metro

Meclis
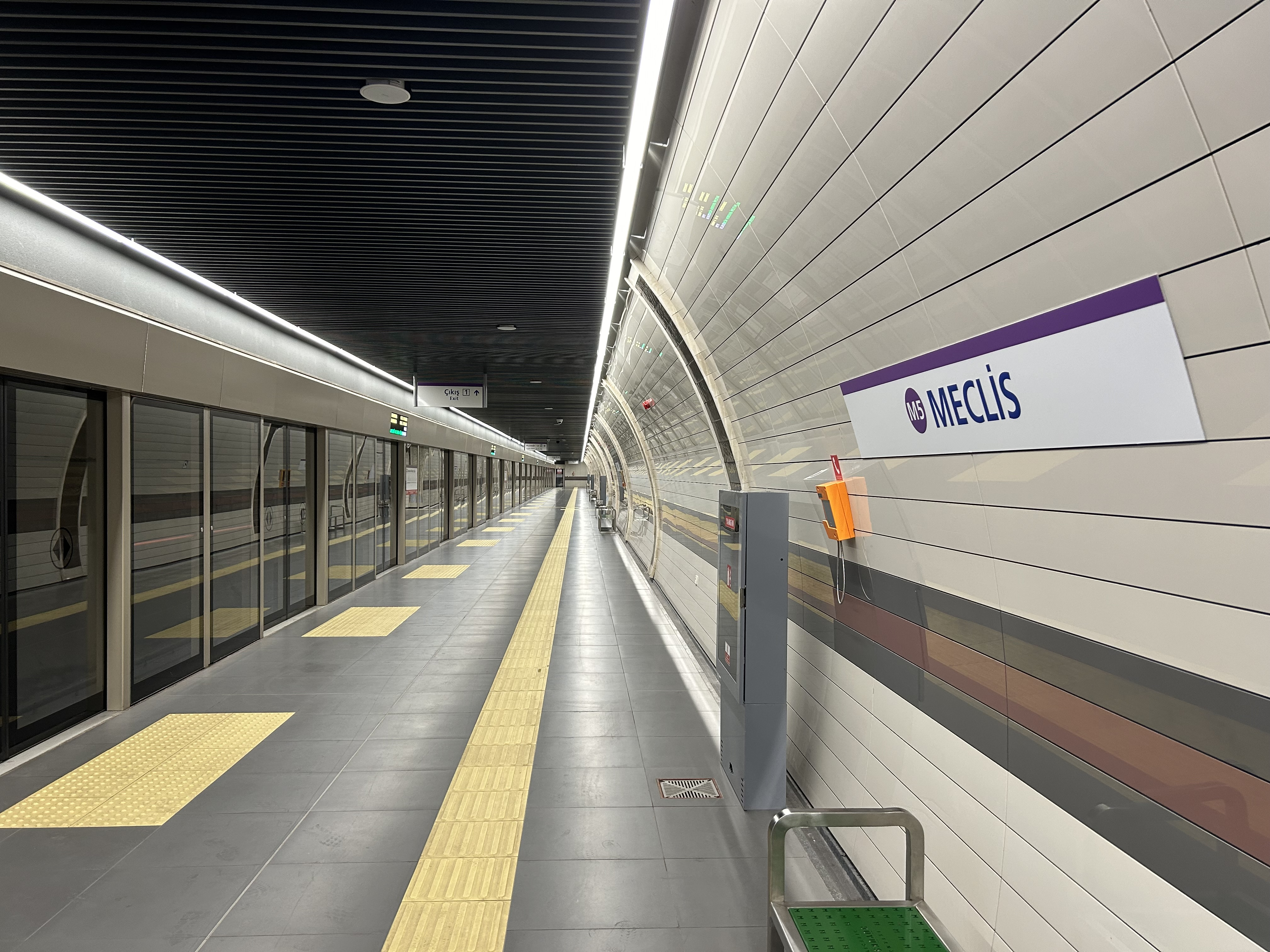
- Platform

General information
- Location: Meclis Neighborhood, Atatürk Street / Gelincik Street; Sancaktepe, Istanbul; Turkey
- Coordinates: 41°0′35″N 29°11′56″E
- System: Istanbul Metro rapid transit station
- Owner: Istanbul Metropolitan Municipality
- Operator: Istanbul Metro
- Line: M5
- Platforms: 1 Island platform
- Tracks: 2
- Connections: İETT Bus: 14S, 19A, 19E, 19EK, 19V, 20D, 131K, 131YS, ÇM42, ÇM43, ÇM44; Istanbul Minibus: Abdurrahmangazi - Dudullu

Construction
- Structure type: Underground
- Parking: No
- Cycle facilities: Yes
- Accessible: Yes

History
- Opened: 16 March 2024 (2 years ago)
- Electrified: 1,500 V DC Overhead line

Services
Preceding station	Istanbul Metro	Following station
Çekmeköy towards Üsküdar	M5 Line	Sarıgazi towards Sultanbeyli
Location

Meclis is an underground station on the M5 line of the Istanbul Metro. It is located under Gelincik Street in the Meclis neighborhood of Sancaktepe. It was opened on 16 March 2024 with the M5 line extension from Çekmeköy to Samandıra Merkez.

== History ==
On 3 December 2021, TBM-1 reached the station and completed its excavation. On 18 January 2022, TBM-1 completed its excavation by reaching the TBM shaft between Meclis and Çekmeköy stations. On 19 October 2022, the first rail welding ceremony of the 3rd stage of the line was held on the TBM shaft. At this ceremony, Istanbul Metropolitan Municipality President Ekrem İmamoğlu stated that the progress rate of the 3rd stage has reached 65%. On 4 May 2023, the first test drive was carried out with the test train departing from Çekmeköy, heading to Meclis and Sarıgazi stations, the electrification of which was completed.

== Station layout ==
Platform level	Westbound	← toward Üsküdar (Çekmeköy)
Platform level	Island platform, doors will open on the left
Platform level	Eastbound	toward Sultanbeyli (Sarıgazi) →

== Operation information ==
The line operates between 06:00 and 00:00 with a train frequency of 4 minutes and 40 seconds during peak hours and 7 minutes at all other times. The line also operates night metro services between 00:00 and 06:00 on Saturdays and Sundays, with trains running every 30 minutes. This provides 66 hours of uninterrupted service between Friday and Sunday. During these hours, fares are charged at double the price.

== Gallery ==
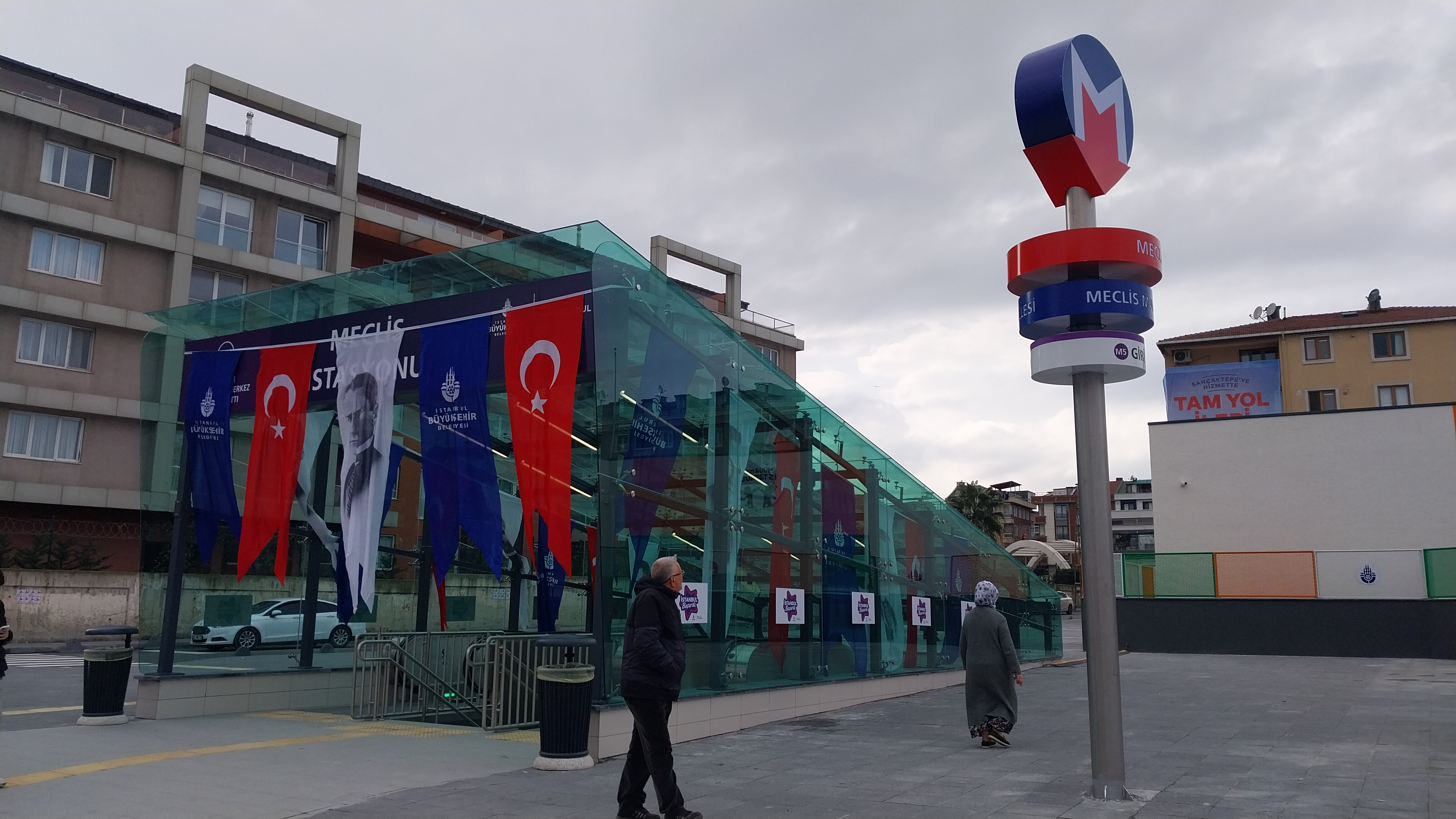
Entrance structure

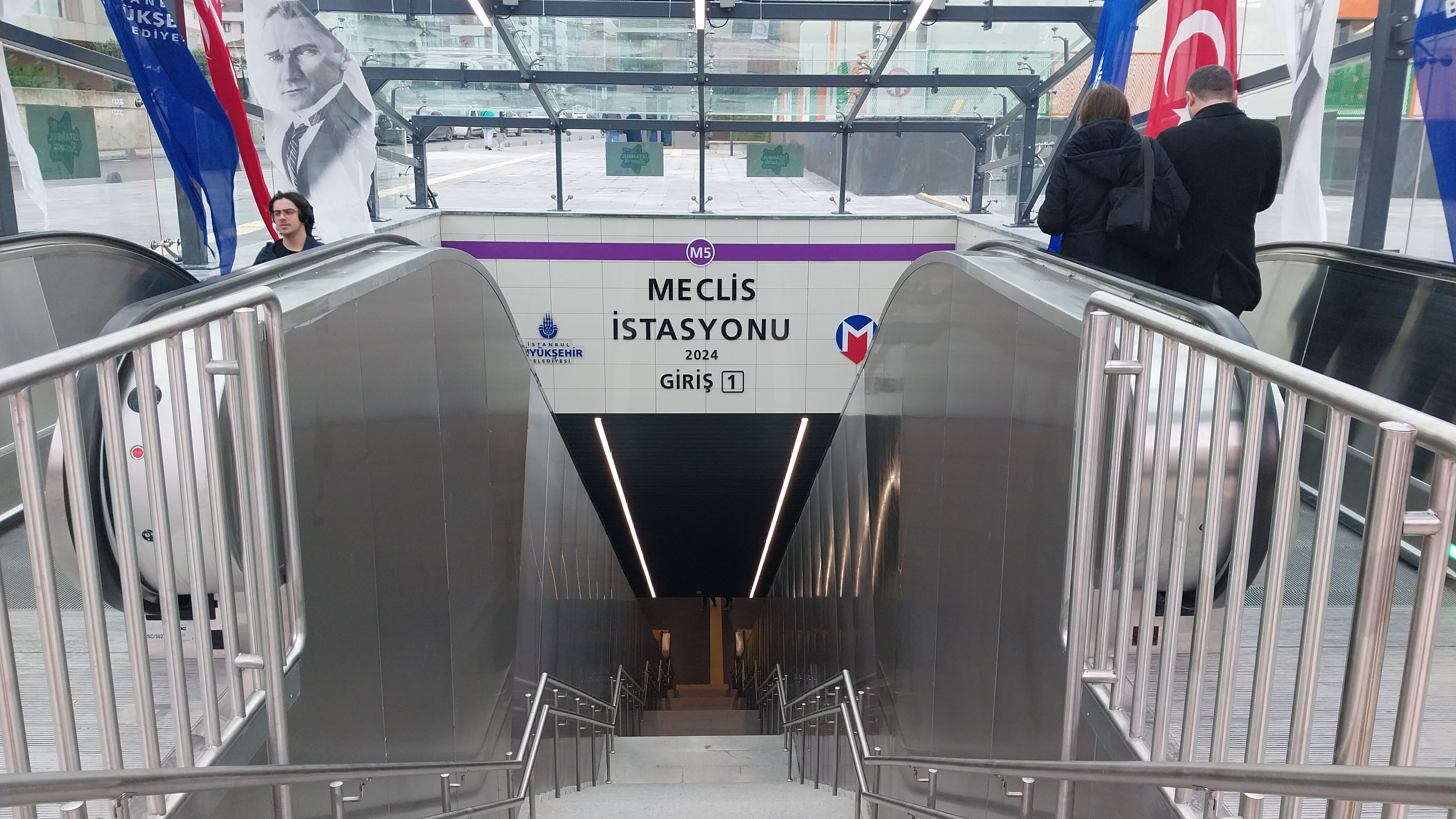
Entrance 1

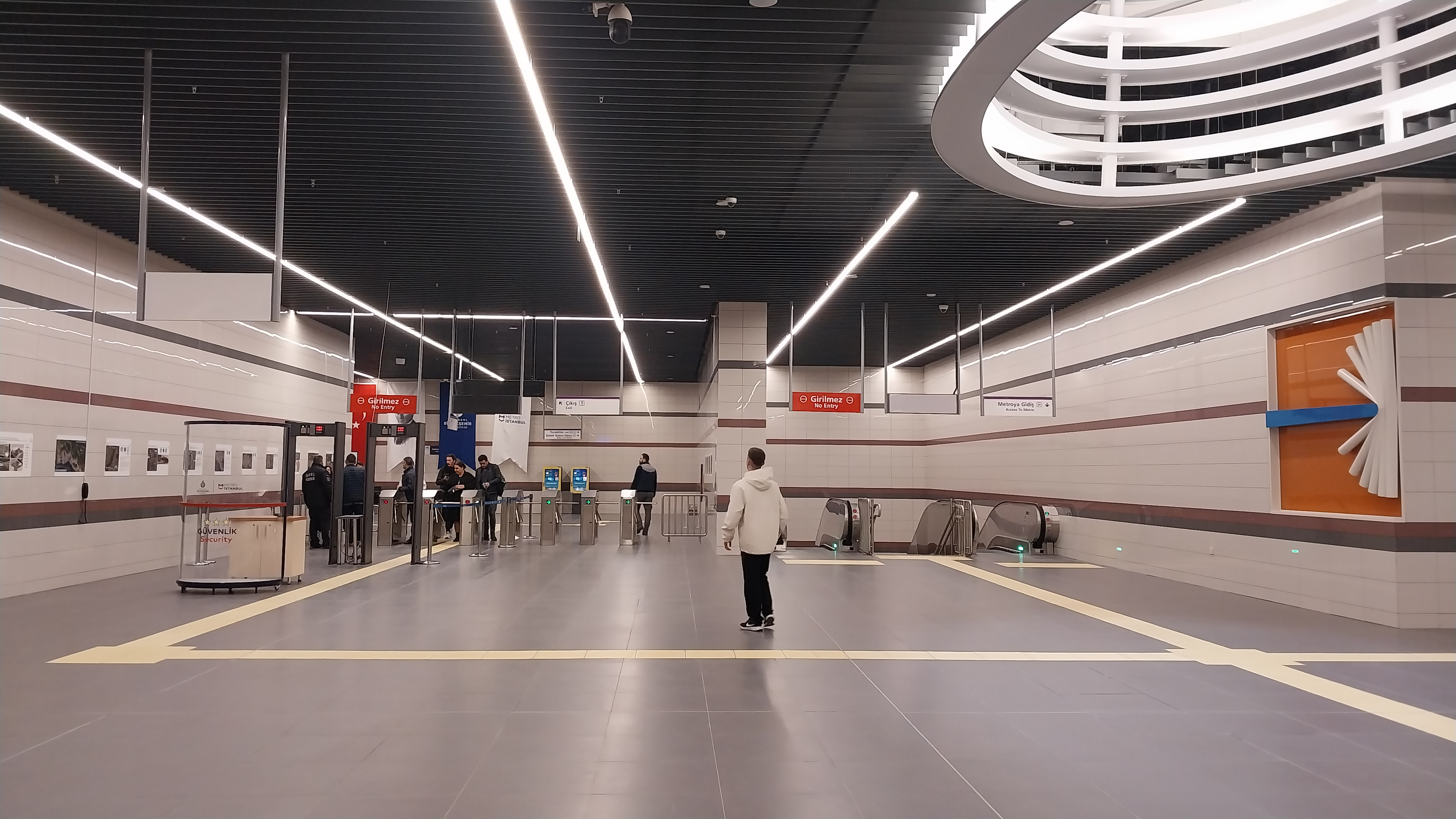
Ticket hall

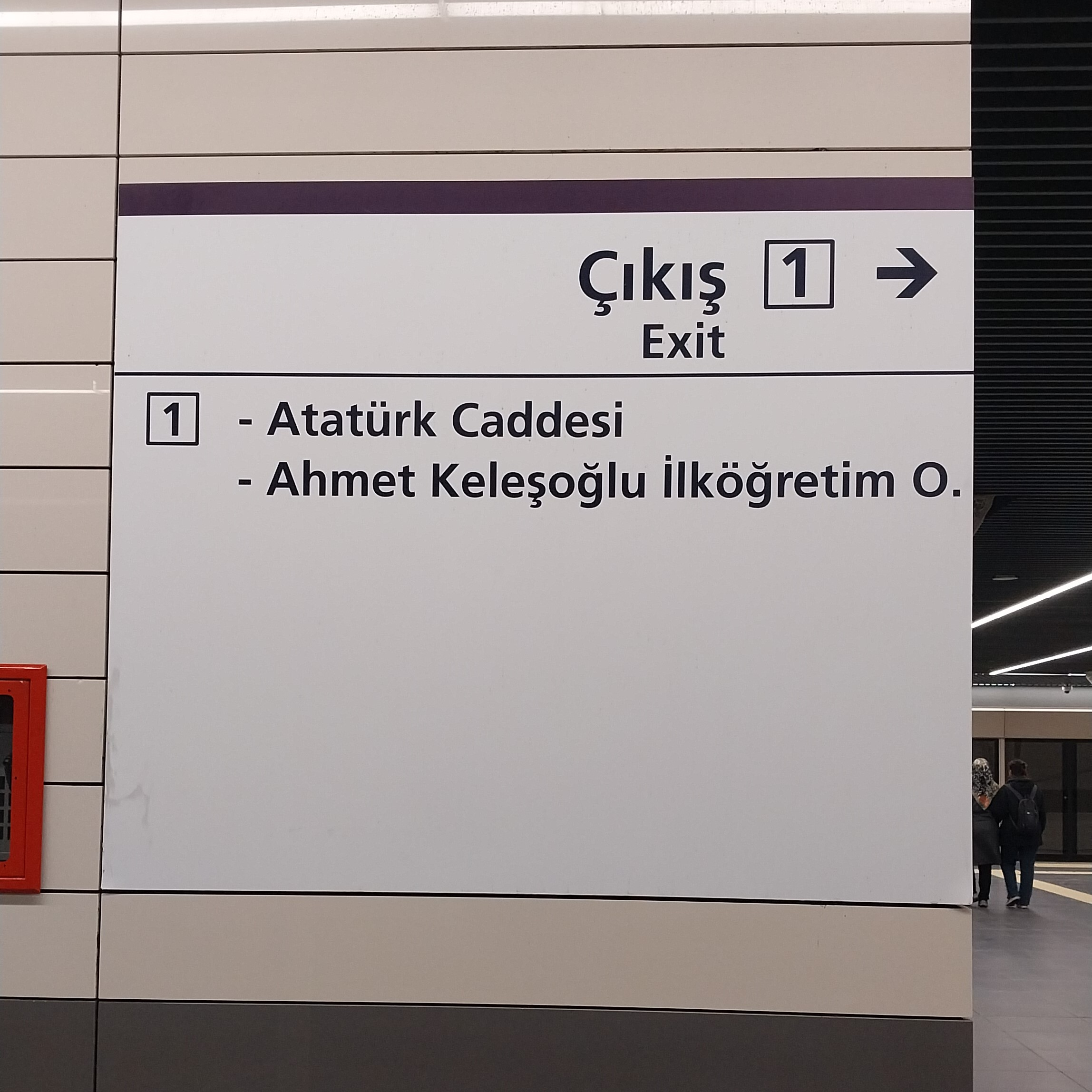
Exit sign

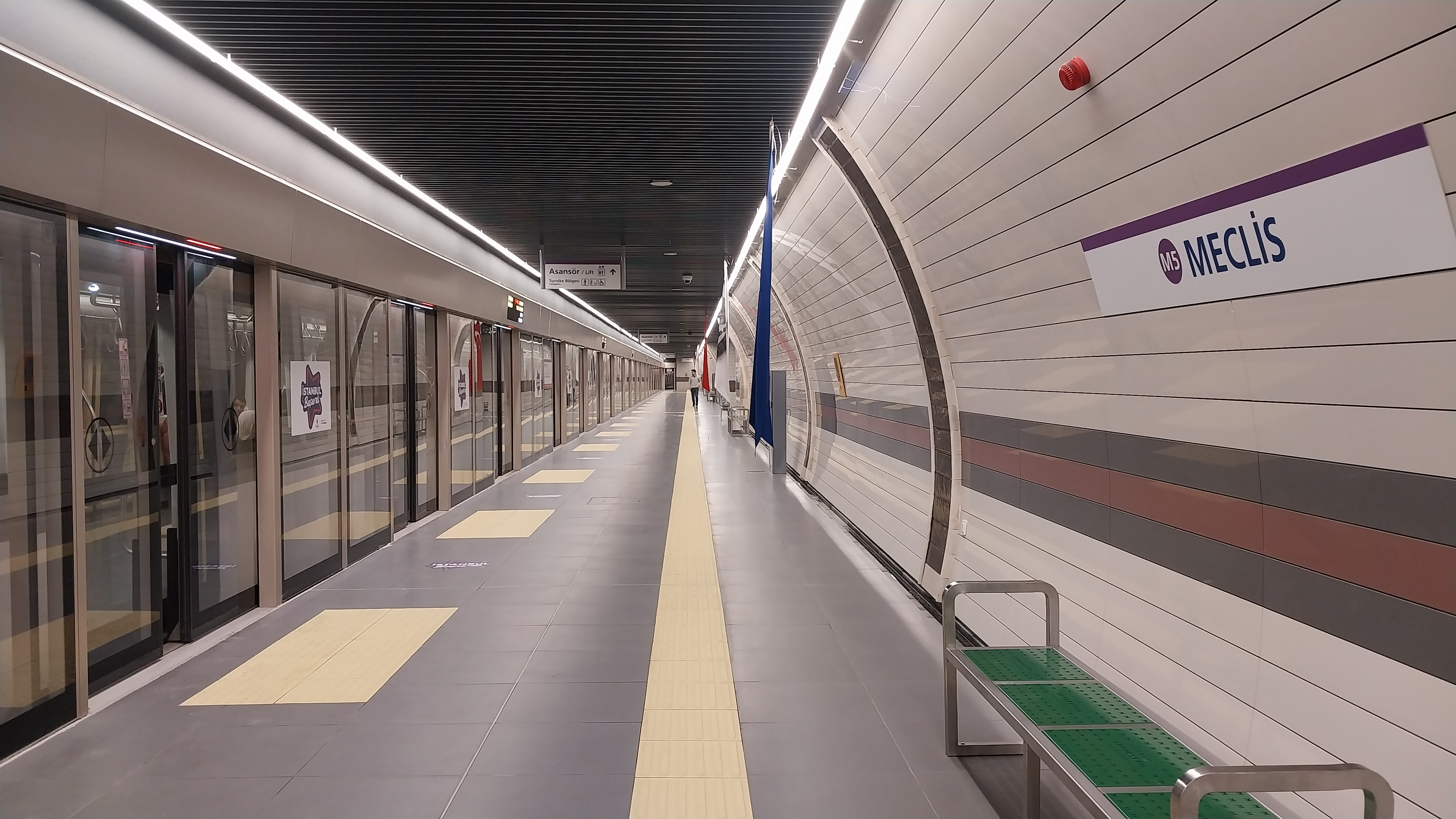
Platform
