= M13 (Istanbul Metro) =

M13 Söğütlüçeşme–Yenidoğan

Overview
- Status: Operational; Emek - Yenidoğan; Projected; Söğütlüçeşme - Emek
- Owner: Istanbul Metropolitan Municipality
- Locale: Istanbul, Turkey
- Termini: Söğütlüçeşme; Yenidoğan
- Stations: 15

Service
- Type: Rapid transit
- System: Istanbul Metro
- Services: 1
- Operator: Metro İstanbul
- Rolling stock: CAF Euros and Hyundai Rotem

History
- Opened: 29 December 2027

Technical
- Line length: 65 km (40 mi)
- Number of tracks: 2
- Track gauge: 1,435 mm (4 ft 8 1/2 in) standard gauge
- Electrification: 1,500 V DC Overhead line

Line M13, officially referred to as the M13 Söğütlüçeşme–Yenidoğan line, is a rapid transit line of the Istanbul Metro system, currently being constructed in the Asian part of Istanbul, Turkey.

Built by the Istanbul Metropolitan Municipality, the line will be 25 km (16 mi) long with 16 stations, and is expected to go into service in 29 December 2027.

The tender of this project was cancelled on 3 January 2018. A plan to build the line was once again started in June 2023, with construction on the section between Emek and Yenidoğan beginning on 10 March 2024.

== Stations ==
No	Station	District	Connections	Type	Notes
1	Söğütlüçeşme	Kadıköy	・・ İETT Bus: 2, 8E, 9K, 10B, 10E, 10G, 14AK, 14B, 14CE, 14ES, 14Y, 14ÇK, 14ŞB, 15SK, 15YK, 15ÇK, 17, 17L, 19ES, 19F, 19K, 19M, 19S, 19Y, 20D, 20K, ER1, ER2, FB1, FB2, GZ1, GZ2	Underground	Kadıköy Municipality・Şükrü Saracoğlu Stadium
2	Şehir Hastanesi	Kadıköy	İETT Bus:	Underground	Dr. Süleyman Yalçın City Hospital
3	Göztepe	Kadıköy	İETT Bus: 3A, 8E, 9K, 10E, 10G, 11T, 13M, 13Y, 14A, 14B, 14BK, 14ES, 15BK, 15ÇK, 15SK, 16A, 16B, 16C, 16F, 16KH, 16M, 16S, 16U, 16Y, 16Z, 17K, 17P, 18A, 18E, 18K, 18M, 18Ü, 18V, 18Y, 19, 19A, 19B, 19E, 19FK, 19H, 19T, 19Z, 20D, 20E, 20K, 20Ü, 21B, 21C, 21G, 21K, 21U, 129T, 130, 130A, 130Ş, 202, 251, 252, 319, 320A, E-10, E-11	Underground	Göztepe Mosque
4	Libadiye	Üsküdar	İETT Bus:	Underground	Emaar Square Mall
5	Gençlik Parkı	Üsküdar	İETT Bus:	Underground	Gençlik Park
6	Finanskent	Ümraniye	・ (Finans Merkezi); İETT Bus: 8K, 8Y, 11M, 13B, 13H, 13M, 13Y, 14BK, 19FS, 20D	Underground	
7	Ataşehir (Note: Not to be confused with Ataşehir on the M12 line.)	Ataşehir	İETT Bus:	Underground	
8	Şerifali	Ümraniye	İETT Bus:	Underground	Turgut Özal Boulevard
9	İMES	Ümraniye	İETT Bus: 14A, 14AK, 14CE, 14S, 14T, 14TM, 14ÇK, 14ŞB, 19D, 19E, 19EK, 19ES, 19S, 19SB, 19V, 320	Underground	İMES・Dudullu Organized Industrial Site
10	Esenkent (Note: Not to be confused with Esenkent on the M7 line.)	Ümraniye	İETT Bus:	Underground	Kadosan Auto Industry Site
↑↑ Under Planning ↑↑
11	Emek	Sancaktepe	İETT Bus:	Underground	Sancaktepe Martyr Prof. Dr. İlhan Varank Hospital
12	Sarıgazi	Sancaktepe	İETT Bus: 11,11SA, 11V, 11ÜS, 14, 14YK, 19A, 19EK,Ü 19S, 19SB, 122H, 122V, 131, 131A, 131B, 131C, 131H, 131K,131Y, 131Ü, 132YM, 522B, 522ST, 622, UM60, UM61, UM73	Underground	Sancaktepe Governorship
13	Aydınlar	Çekmeköy	İETT Bus:	Underground	Sultangazi Avenue・Demokrasi Avenue
14	Cumhuriyet	Çekmeköy	İETT Bus:	Underground	Turgut Özal Avenue
15	Yenidoğan	Sancaktepe	İETT Bus:	Underground	Yenidoğan Anatolian High School
