= Çekmeköy station =

Metro station in Istanbul, Turkey

Çekmeköy
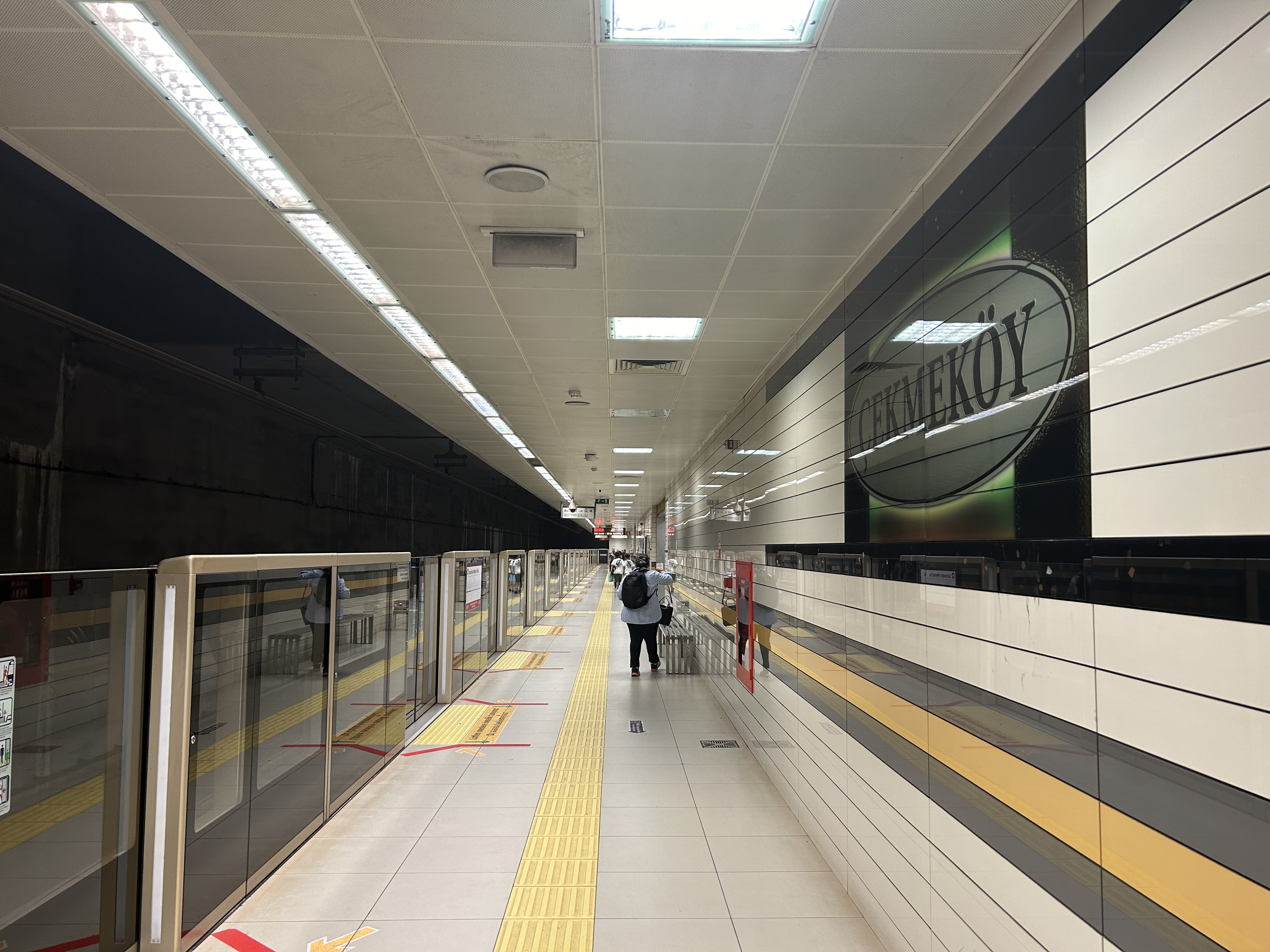
- Platform

General information
- Location: Mehmet Akif Neighborhood, Şile Highway, 34782; Çekmeköy, Istanbul; Turkey
- Coordinates: 41°0′52″N 29°11′21″E
- System: Istanbul Metro rapid transit station
- Owner: Istanbul Metropolitan Municipality
- Operator: Metro Istanbul
- Line: M5
- Platforms: 1 island platform
- Tracks: 2

Construction
- Structure type: Underground
- Parking: No
- Cycle facilities: Yes
- Accessible: Yes

History
- Opened: 21 October 2018 (7 years ago)
- Electrified: 1,500 V DC Overhead line

Services
Preceding station	Istanbul Metro	Following station
Necip Fazıl towards Üsküdar	M5 Line	Meclis towards Sultanbeyli
Location

Çekmeköy is an underground station on the M5 line of the Istanbul Metro in Çekmeköy. The station is located on Şile Highway in the Mehmet Akif neighborhood of Çekmeköy. Connection to IETT city buses is available at street level.

The M5 line operates as fully automatic unattended train operation (UTO). The station consists of an island platform with two tracks. Since the M5 is an ATO line, protective gates on each side of the platform open only when a train is in the station.

Çekmeköy station was opened on 21 October 2018. It was the eastern terminus of the line until the extension to Samandıra Merkez opened on 16 March 2024.

The station has 2 exits. There are 6 elevators and 12 escalators.

== Station layout ==
Z	Enter/Exit↓	
B1	Underpass ↓	
B2	Underpass →	Ticket Hall ↓
B3		Platform

Platform level	Westbound	← toward Üsküdar (Necip Fazıl)
Platform level	Island platform, doors will open on the left
Platform level	Eastbound	toward Sultanbeyli (Meclis) →

== Connections ==
Connection to IETT city buses is available from at street level.

City buses; 9ÇN, 122D, 122H, 131K, 132ÇK, 522, 522B, ÇM44, UM40, UM60, UM61, UM62, UM73

== Operation information ==
The line operates between 06:00 and 00:00 with a train frequency of 4 minutes and 40 seconds during peak hours and 7 minutes at all other times. The line also operates night metro services between 00:00 and 06:00 on Saturdays and Sundays, with trains running every 30 minutes. This provides 66 hours of uninterrupted service between Friday and Sunday. During these hours, fares are charged at double the price. During this time, only Entrance 1 is open at this station.

== M5 line extension to Sultanbeyli ==
Between 2018 and 2024, the last station of the east side of the 20-kilometer M5 metro line is Çekmeköy station. The M5 Çekmeköy - Sancaktepe - Sultanbeyli metro extended the line to a total length of 30.9 kilometres. The first part of this section, from this station to Samandıra Merkez, opened on 16 March 2024, and the remaining section to Sultanbeyli opened on 22 May 2026.

== Gallery ==
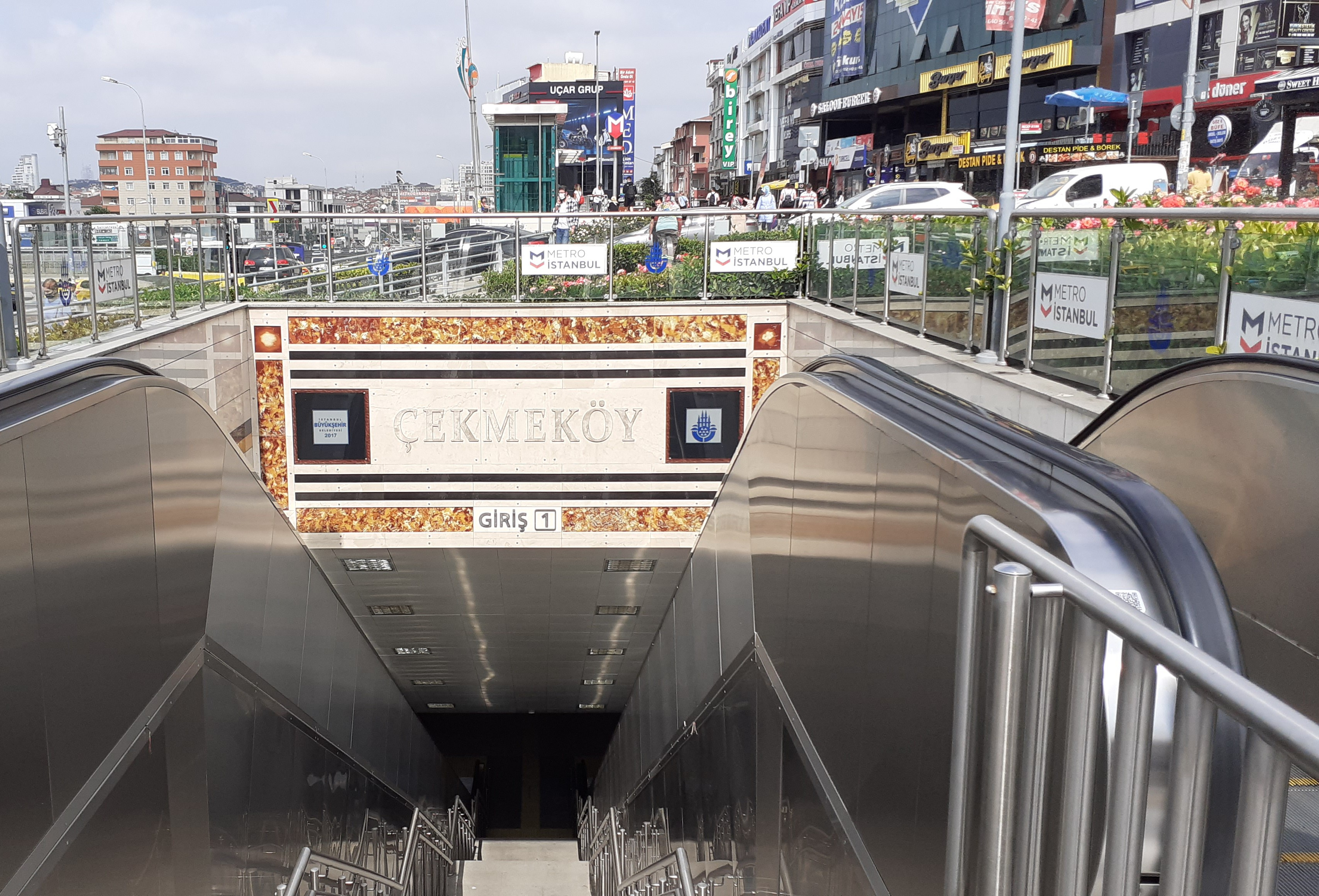
Entrance 1

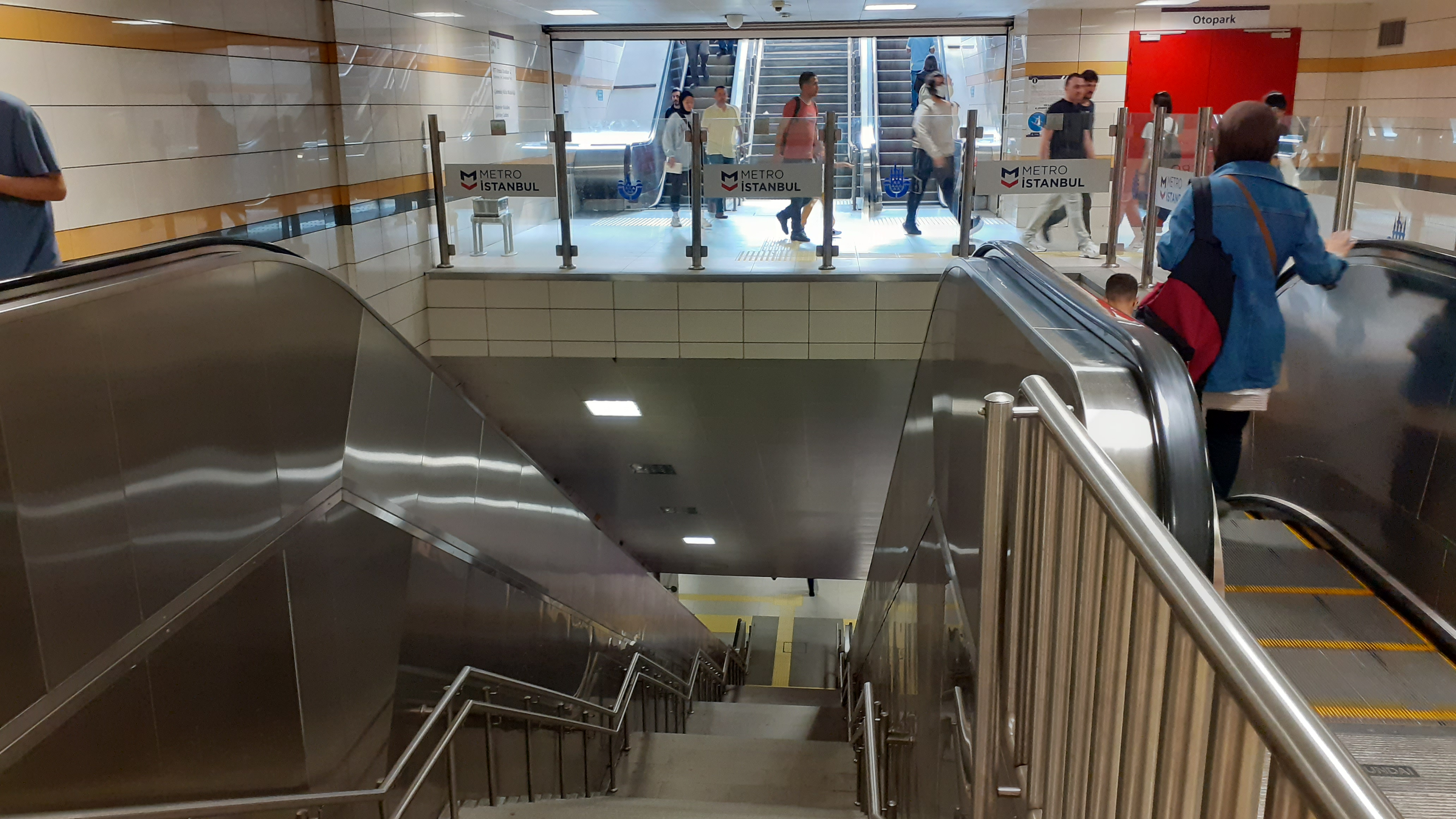
Clearance

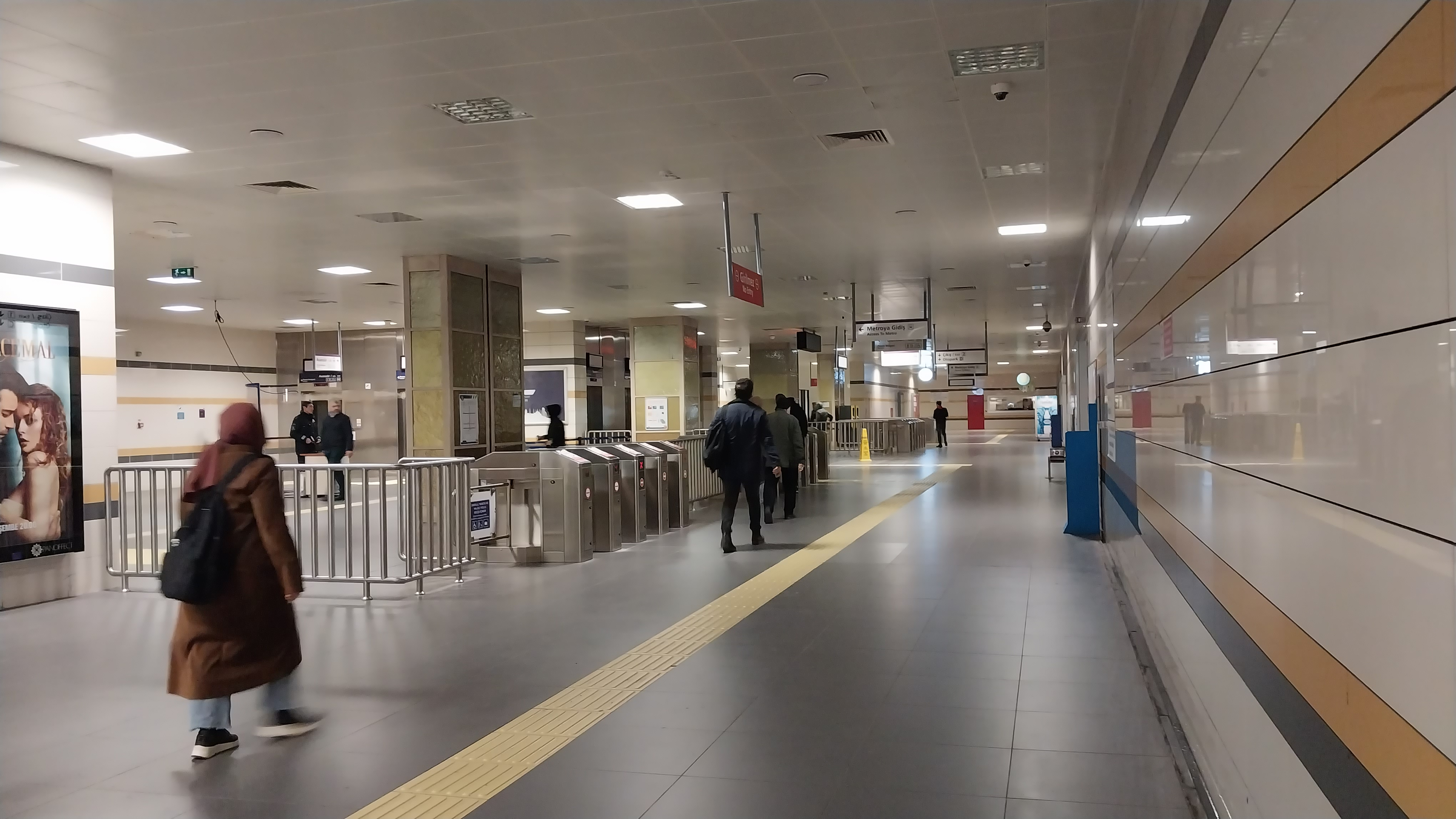
Ticket hall

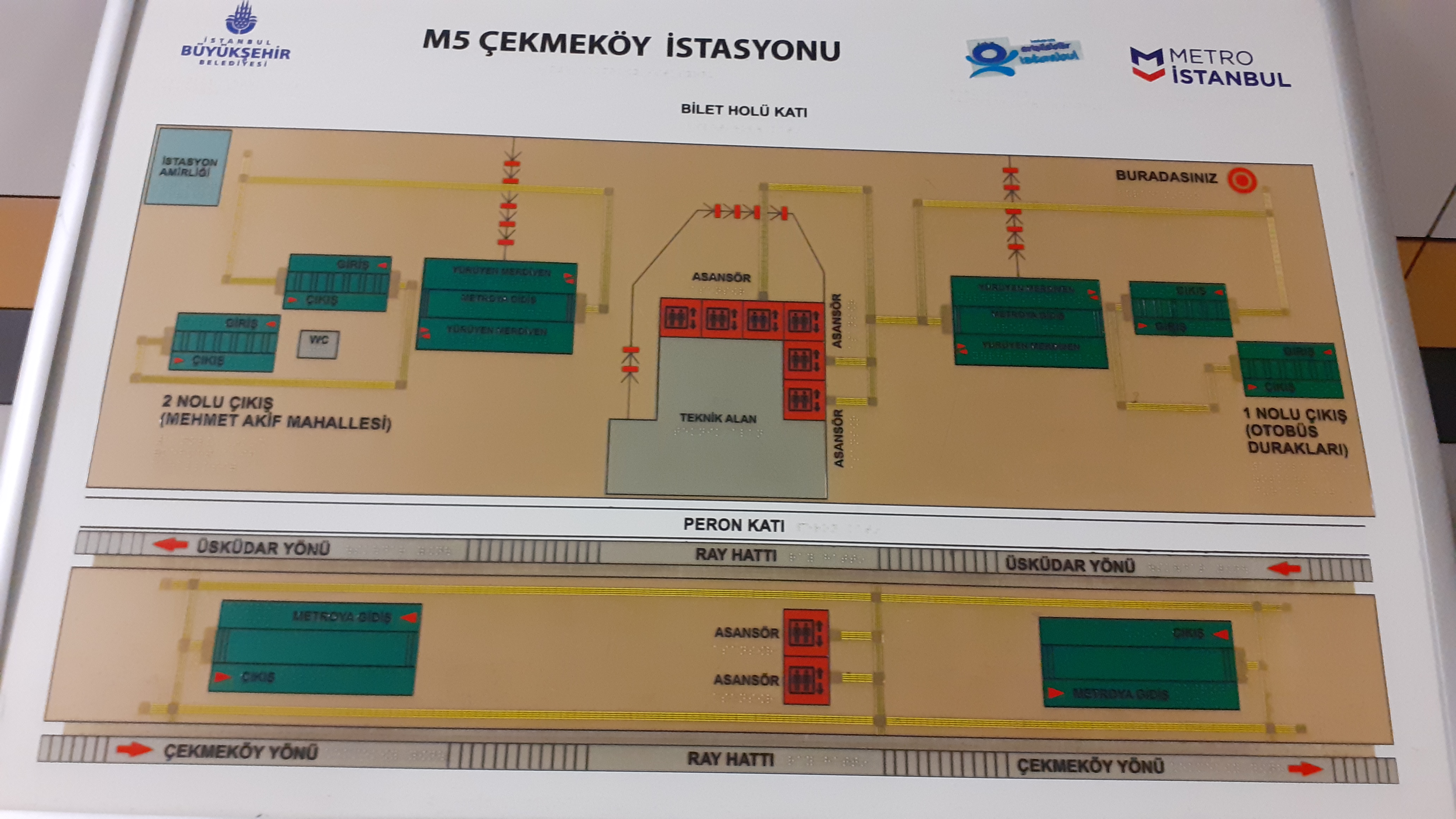
Station diagram

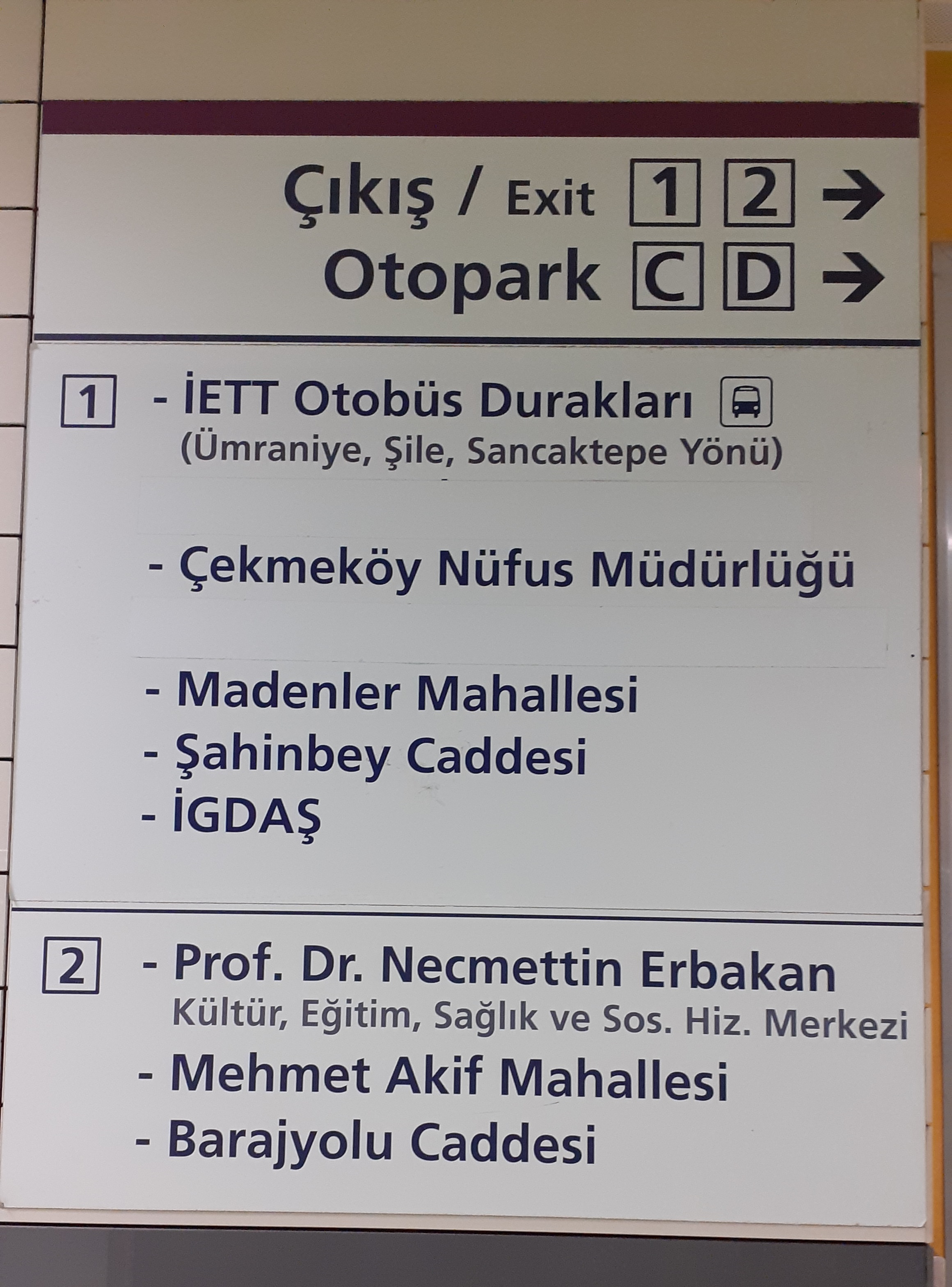
Exit sign

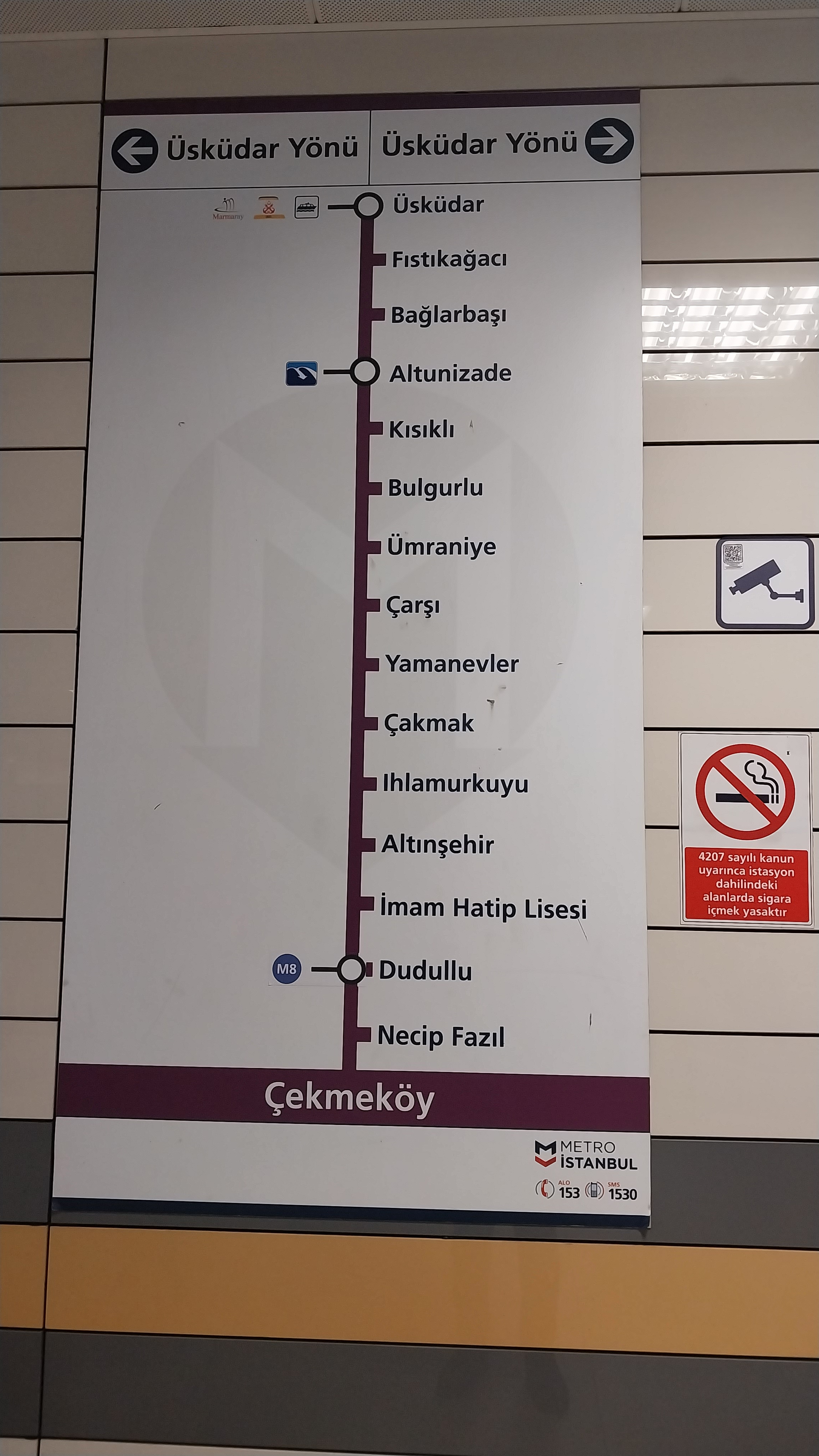
Route map

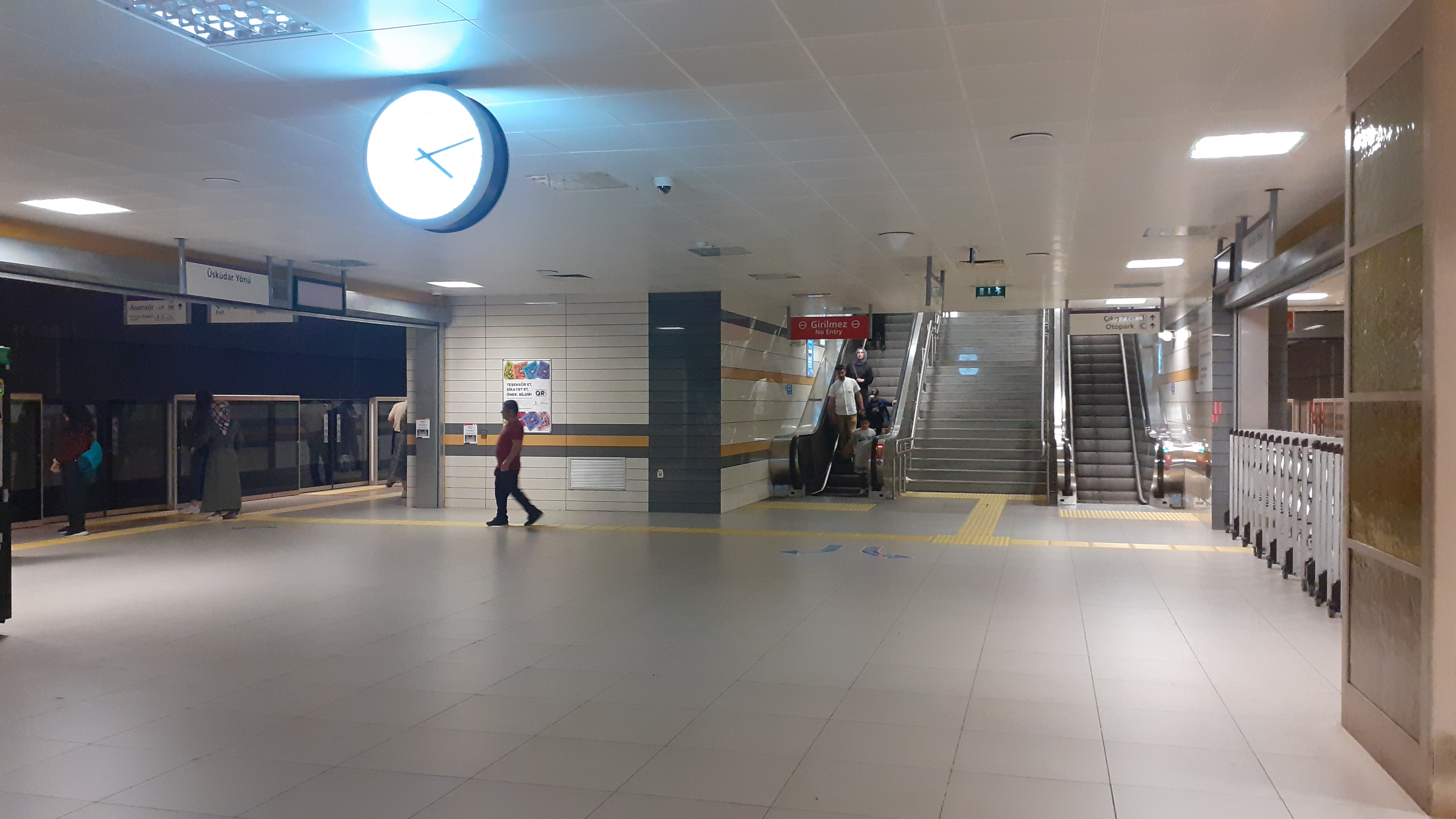
Platform with access stairs

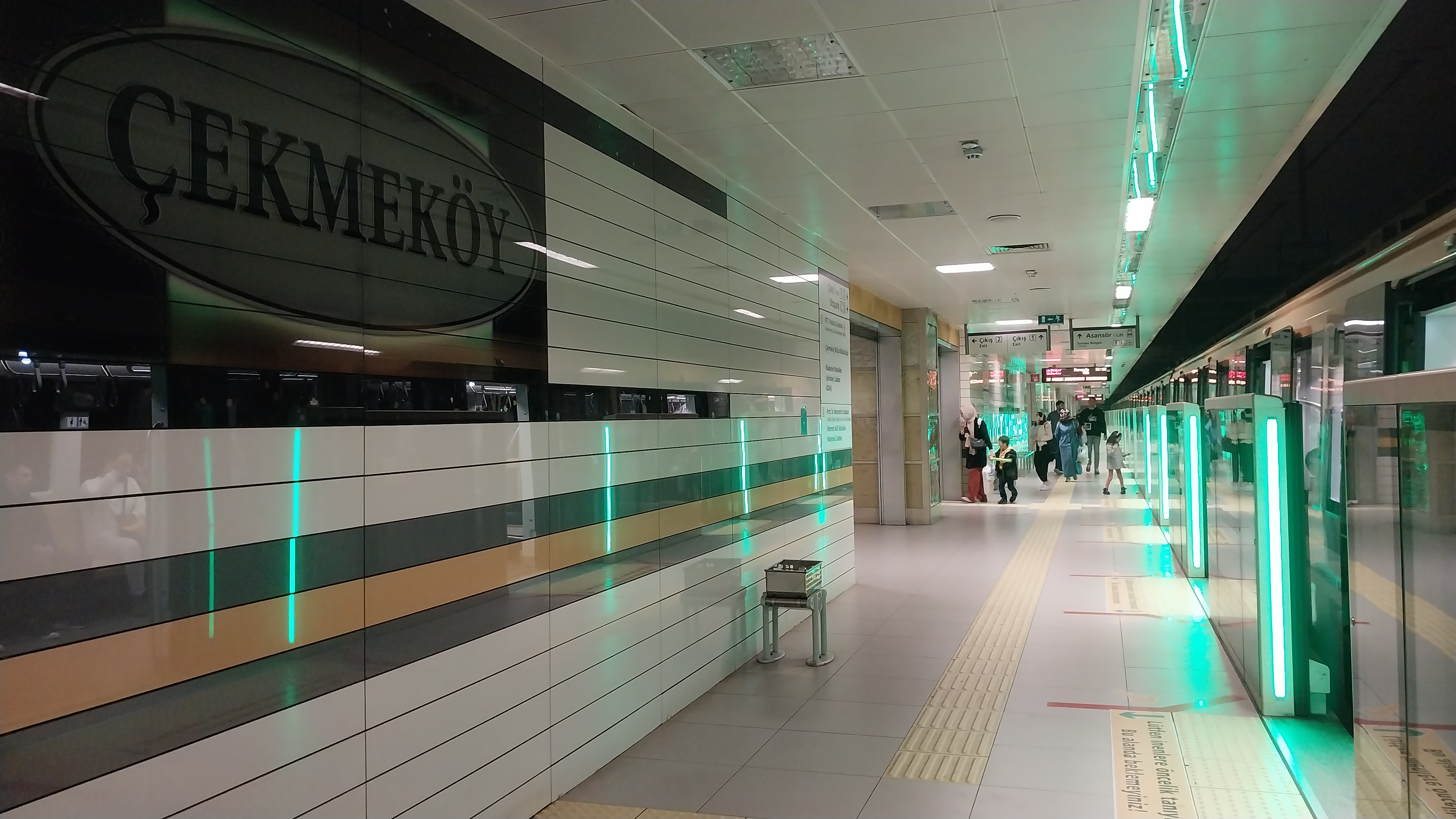
Platform
