= Samandıra Merkez station =

Station of the Istanbul Metro

Samandıra Merkez
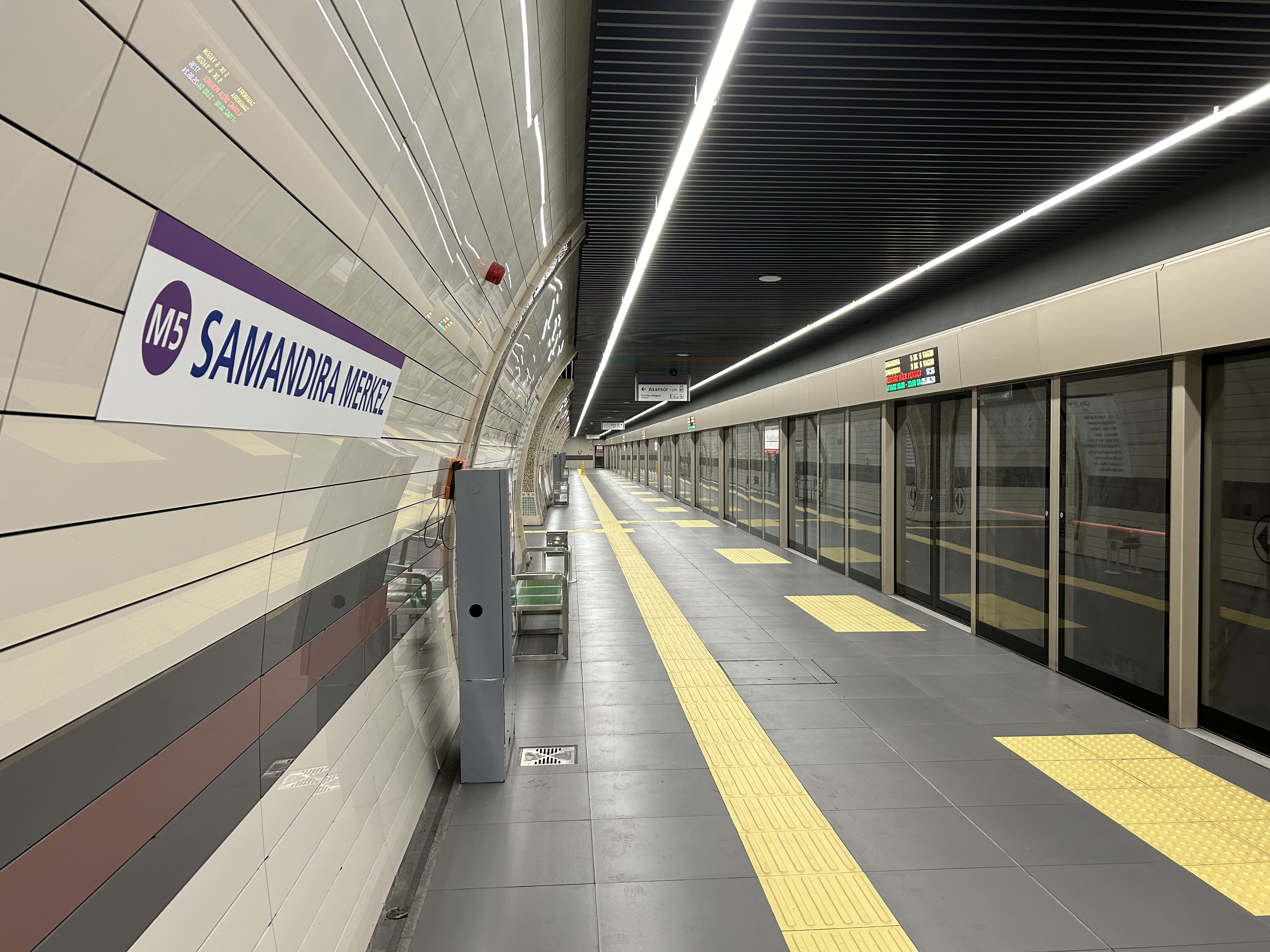
- Platform

General information
- Location: Osmangazi Neighborhood, Osmangazi Street, 34887; Sancaktepe, Istanbul; Turkey
- Coordinates: 40°59′1″N 29°13′53″E
- System: Istanbul Metro rapid transit station
- Owner: Istanbul Metropolitan Municipality
- Operator: Istanbul Metro
- Line: M5
- Platforms: 1 Island platform
- Tracks: 2
- Connections: İETT Bus: Osmangazi Sapağı Otobüs Durağı: 11SA, 11ÜS, 14KS, 14S, 18E, 18F, 18UK, 18V,18Y, 18Ü, 19SB, 122H, 131, 131A, 131B, 131H, 131V, 131Y 131Ü, 132M, 132N, 132S, 132SB, 132YB, 132YM, 132ÇK, 320A, 522ST, KM70, UM60, UM73; Istanbul Minibus: Kartal - Merve Mahallesi, Dudullu - Sultanbeyli, Kartal - Sultanbeyli

Construction
- Structure type: Underground
- Parking: No
- Cycle facilities: Yes
- Accessible: Yes

History
- Opened: 16 March 2024 (2 years ago)
- Electrified: 1,500 V DC Overhead line

Services
Preceding station	Istanbul Metro	Following station
Sancaktepe towards Üsküdar	M5 Line	Veysel Karani towards Sultanbeyli
Location

Samandıra Merkez is an underground station on the M5 line of the Istanbul Metro. It is located under Osmangazi Street in the Osmangazi neighborhood of Sancaktepe. It was opened on 16 March 2024 with the M5 line extension from Çekmeköy to Samandıra Merkez, and served as the eastern terminus of the line until the extension to Sultanbeyli opened on 22 May 2026.

== History ==
TBM-3, which started tunneling from Sancaktepe Station on 12 February 2022, reached this station on 20 June 2022. The TBM then continued tunneling towards Veysel Karani on 1 March 2023.

== Station layout ==
Platform level	Westbound	← toward Üsküdar (Sancaktepe)
Platform level	Island platform, doors will open on the left
Platform level	Eastbound	toward Sultanbeyli (Veysel Karani) →

== Operation information ==
The line operates between 06:00 and 00:00 with a train frequency of 4 minutes and 40 seconds during peak hours and 7 minutes at all other times. The line also operates night metro services between 00:00 and 06:00 on Saturdays and Sundays, with trains running every 30 minutes. This provides 66 hours of uninterrupted service between Friday and Sunday. During these hours, fares are charged at double the price.

== Gallery ==
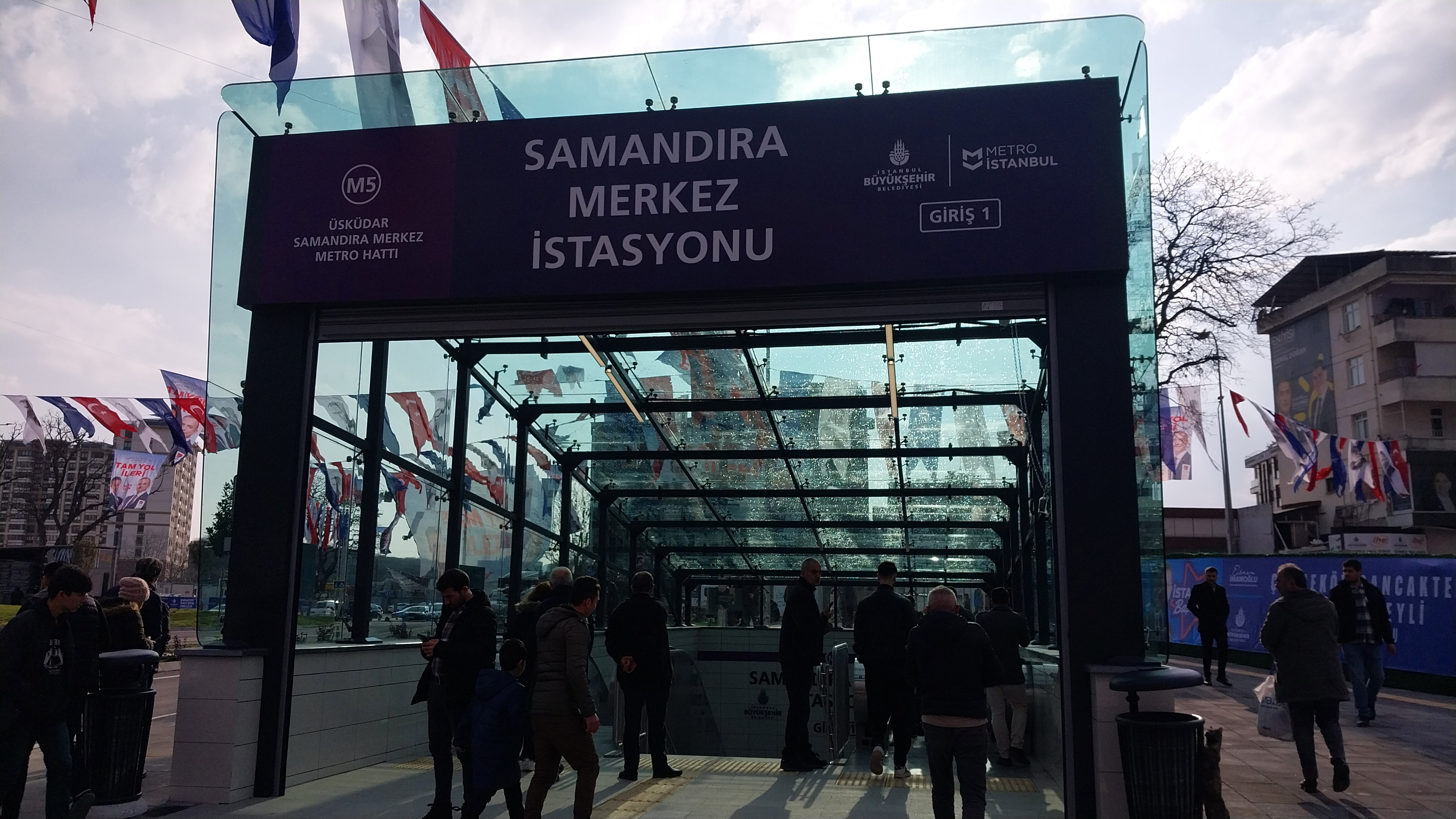
Entrance structure

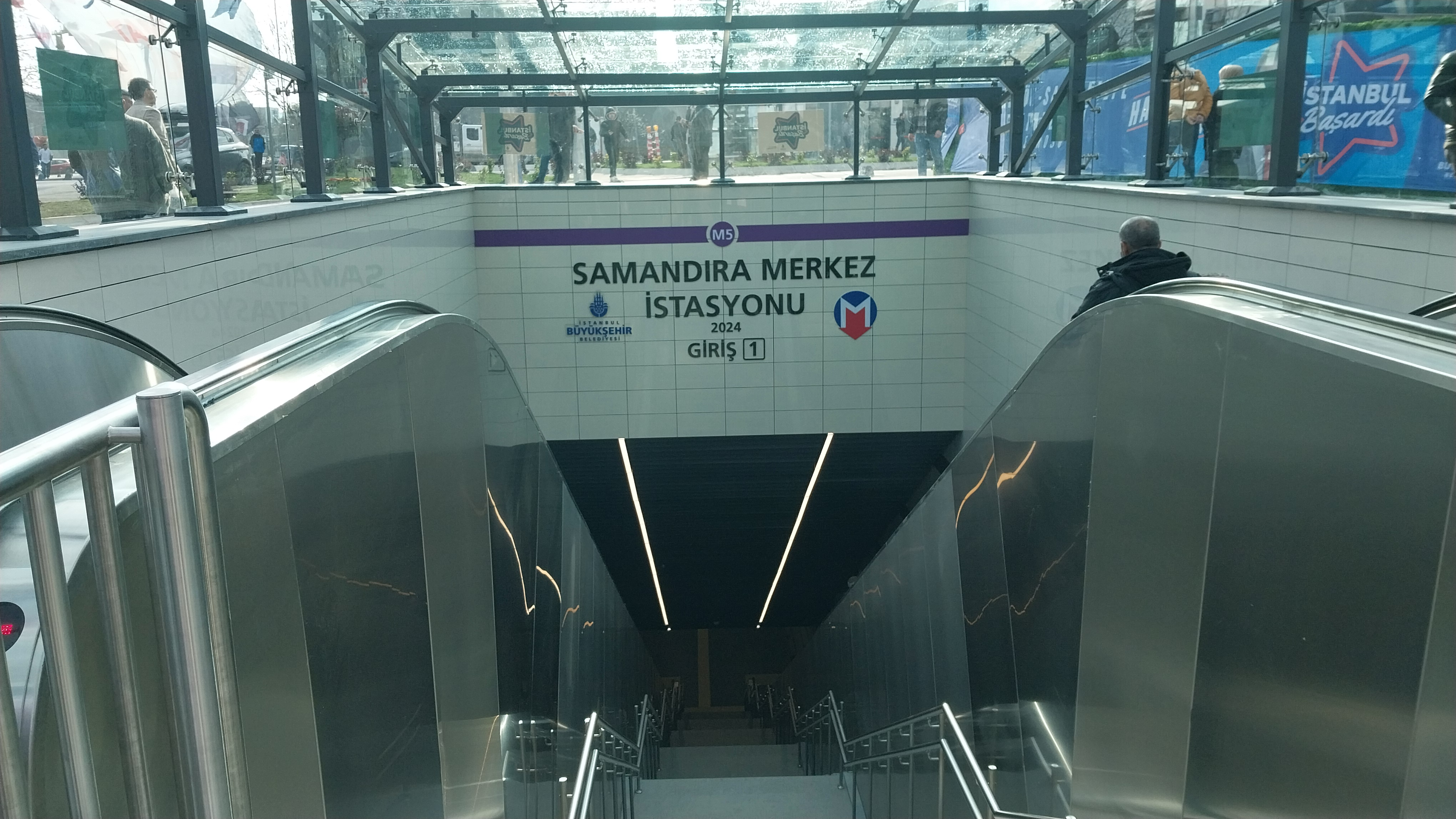
Entrance 1

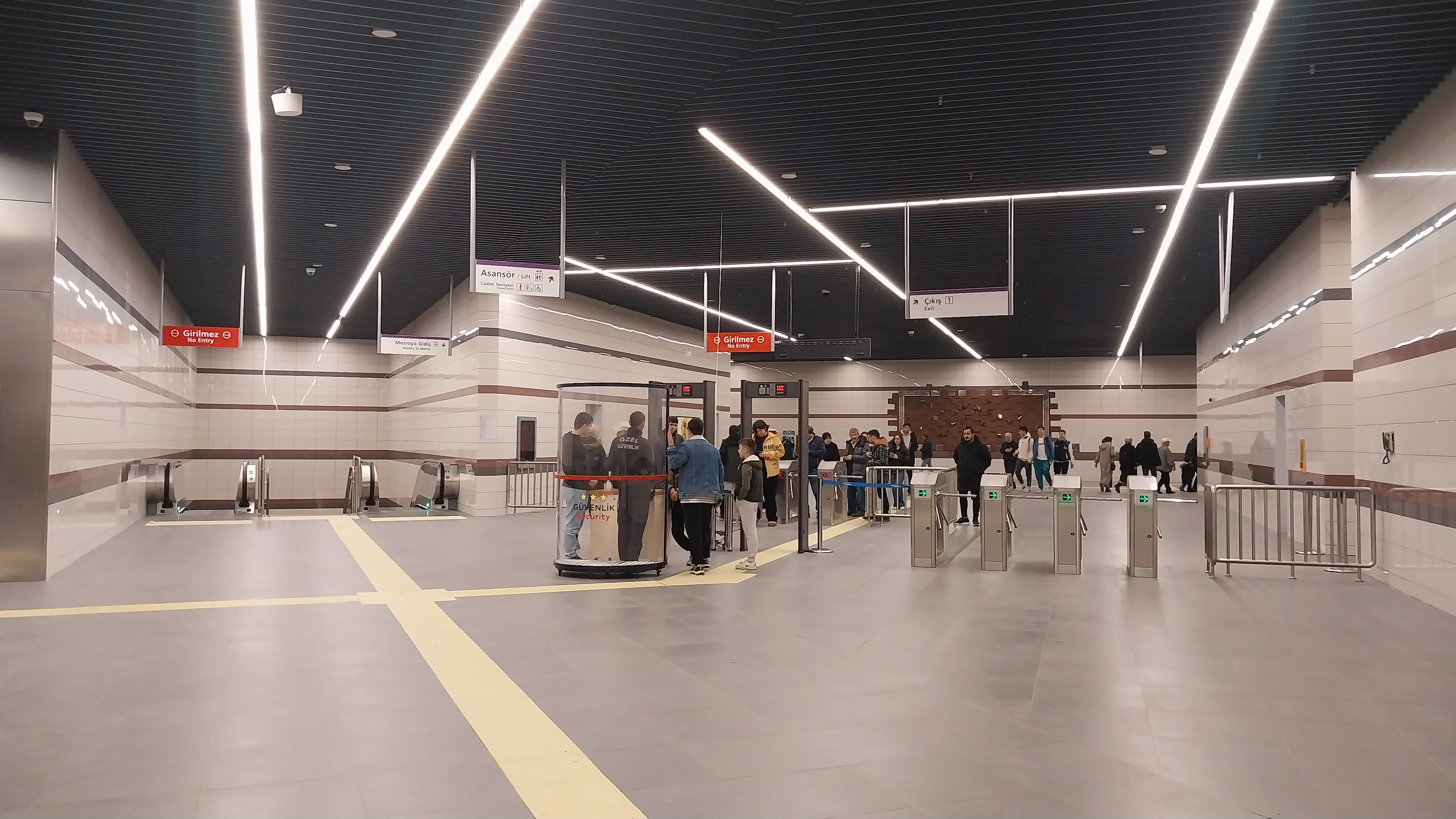
Ticket hall

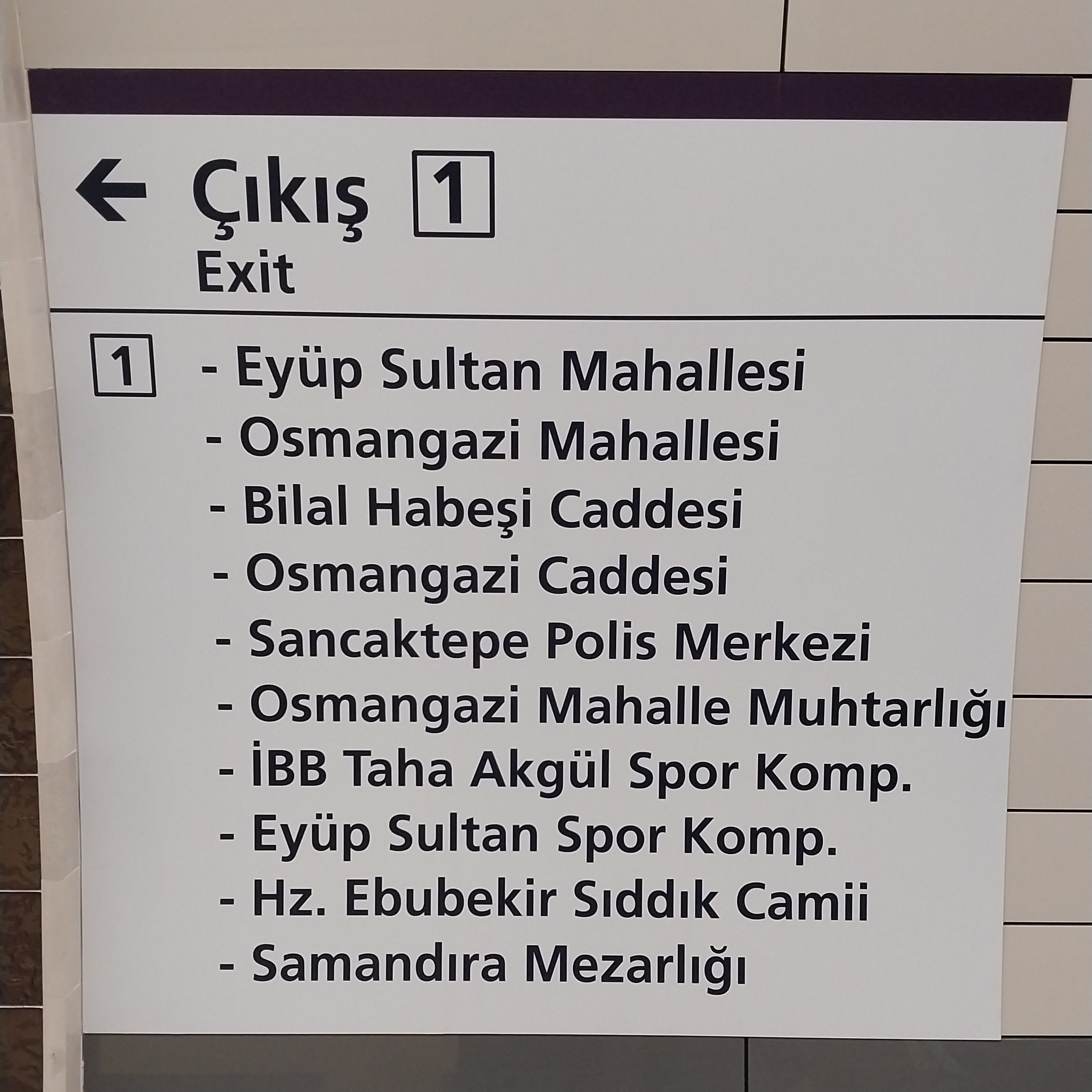
Exit sign

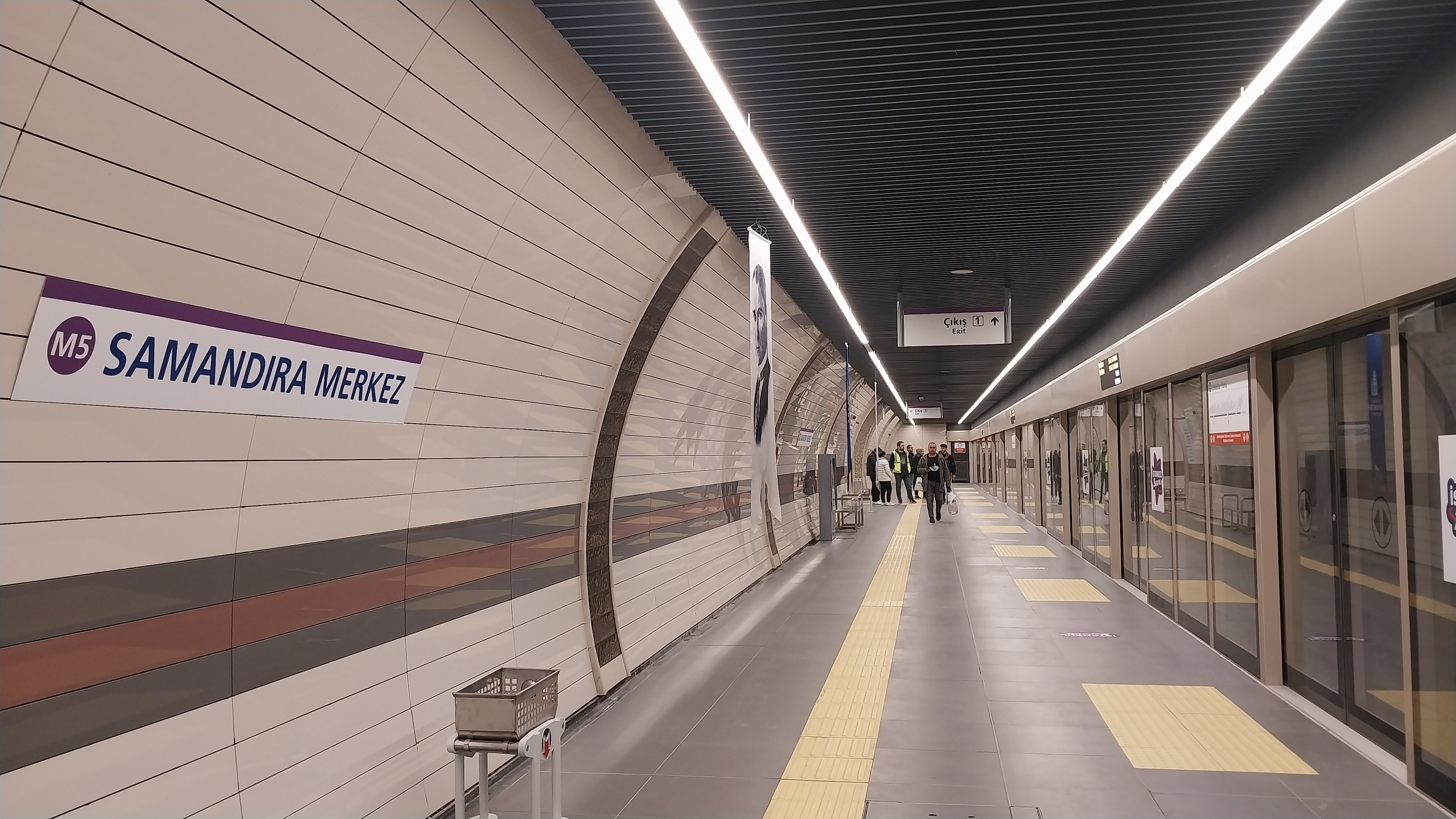
Platform
