= Sancaktepe =

- District and municipality
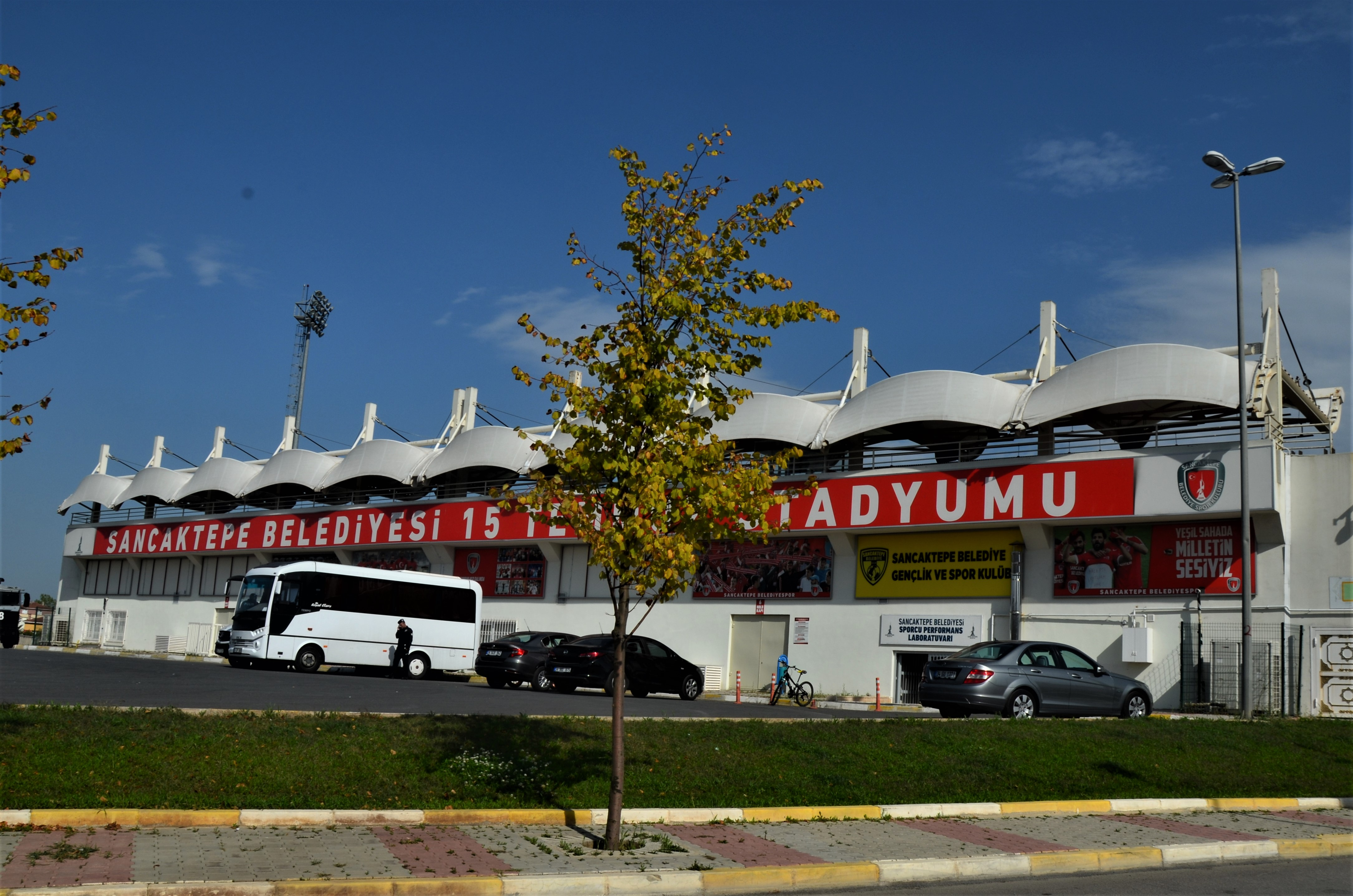
- 15 Temmuz Stadium in Sancaktepe district

- Logo

- Map showing Sancaktepe District in Istanbul Province

- Location within Turkey Location within Istanbul
- Coordinates: 40°59′00″N 29°12′00″E
- Country: Turkey
- Province: Istanbul

Government
  - Mayor: Alper Yeğin (CHP)
- Area: 63 km^{2} (24 sq mi)
- Population (2022): 489,848
  - Density: 7,800/km^{2} (20,000/sq mi)
- Time zone: UTC+3 (TRT)
- Area code: 0216
- Website: www.sancaktepe.bel.tr

Sancaktepe is a municipality and district of Istanbul Province, Turkey. Its area is 63 km^{2}, and its population is 489,848 (2022).

In 2008 the district Sancaktepe was created from parts of the districts Kartal and Ümraniye. The urban part of the new district was established as a municipality. At the 2013 Turkish local government reorganisation, the rural part of the district was integrated into the municipality, the villages becoming neighbourhoods.

== Composition ==
There are 19 neighbourhoods in Sancaktepe District:

- Abdurrahmangazi
- Akpınar
- Atatürk
- Emek
- Eyüp Sultan
- Fatih
- Hilal
- İnönü
- Kemal Türkler
- Meclis
- Merve
- Mevlana
- Osmangazi
- Paşaköy
- Safa
- Sarıgazi
- Veysel Karani
- Yenidoğan
- Yunus Emre

== History ==
Sancaktepe's oldest historic structure is Damatris Summer Palace that was built by I. Tiberius Konstantinos (578–582) and Maurice (582–602) in Byzantine Age. The Ottoman Empire conquered this area completely in 1328.

== Notable buildings and structures ==
- Istanbul Samandıra Army Air Base
- Sancaktepe Prof. Dr. Feriha Öz Emergency Hospital
- Sancaktepe Stadium
