= İmam Hatip Lisesi station =

Metro station in Istanbul, Turkey

İmam Hatip Lisesi

General information
- Location: Adem Yavuz Neighborhood, Alemdağ Street 34773; Ümraniye, Istanbul
- Coordinates: 41.015861°N 29.15°E
- System: Istanbul Metro rapid transit station
- Owner: Istanbul Metropolitan Municipality
- Operator: Metro Istanbul
- Line: M5
- Platforms: 1 island platform
- Tracks: 2

Construction
- Structure type: Underground
- Accessible: Yes

History
- Opened: 21 October 2018 (7 years ago)
- Electrified: 1,500 V DC Overhead line

Services
| Preceding station | Istanbul Metro | Following station |
|---|---|---|
| Altınşehir towards Üsküdar | M5 Line | Dudullu towards Sultanbeyli |
Location

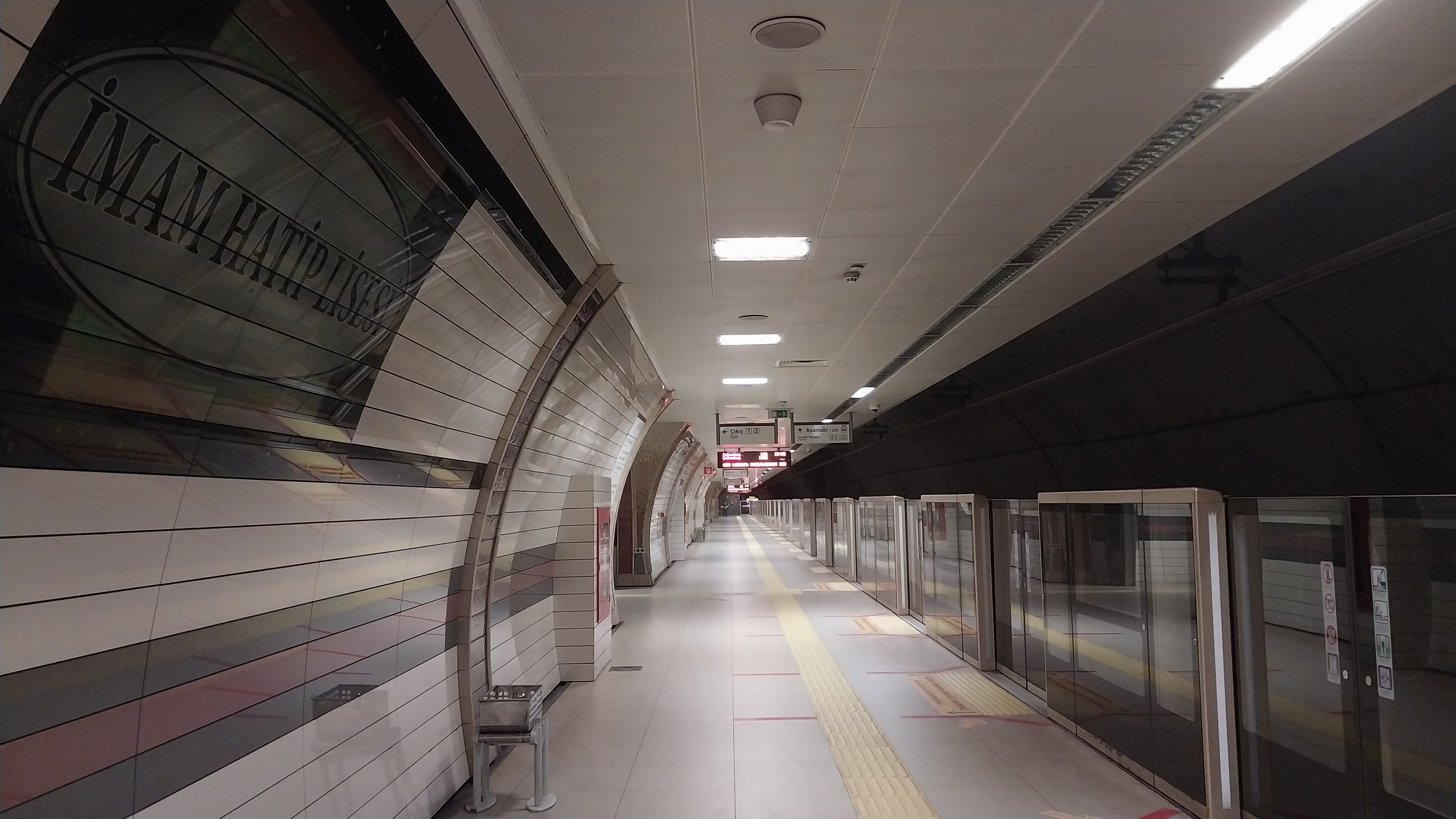
İmam Hatip Lisesi metro platform

İmam Hatip Lisesi is an underground station on the M5 line of the Istanbul Metro in Ümraniye. The station is located on Alemdağ Street in the Adem Yavuz neighborhood of Ümraniye. Connection to IETT city buses is available at street level.

The M5 line operates as fully automatic unattended train operation (UTO). The station consists of an island platform with two tracks. Since the M5 is an ATO line, protective gates on each side of the platform open only when a train is in the station.

İmam Hatip Lisesi station was opened on 21 October 2018.

== Station layout ==
| Platform level | Westbound | ← toward Üsküdar (Altınşehir) |
| Platform level | Island platform, doors will open on the left |
| Platform level | Eastbound | toward Sultanbeyli (Dudullu) → |
