= Çakmak station =

Metro station in Istanbul, Turkey

Çakmak
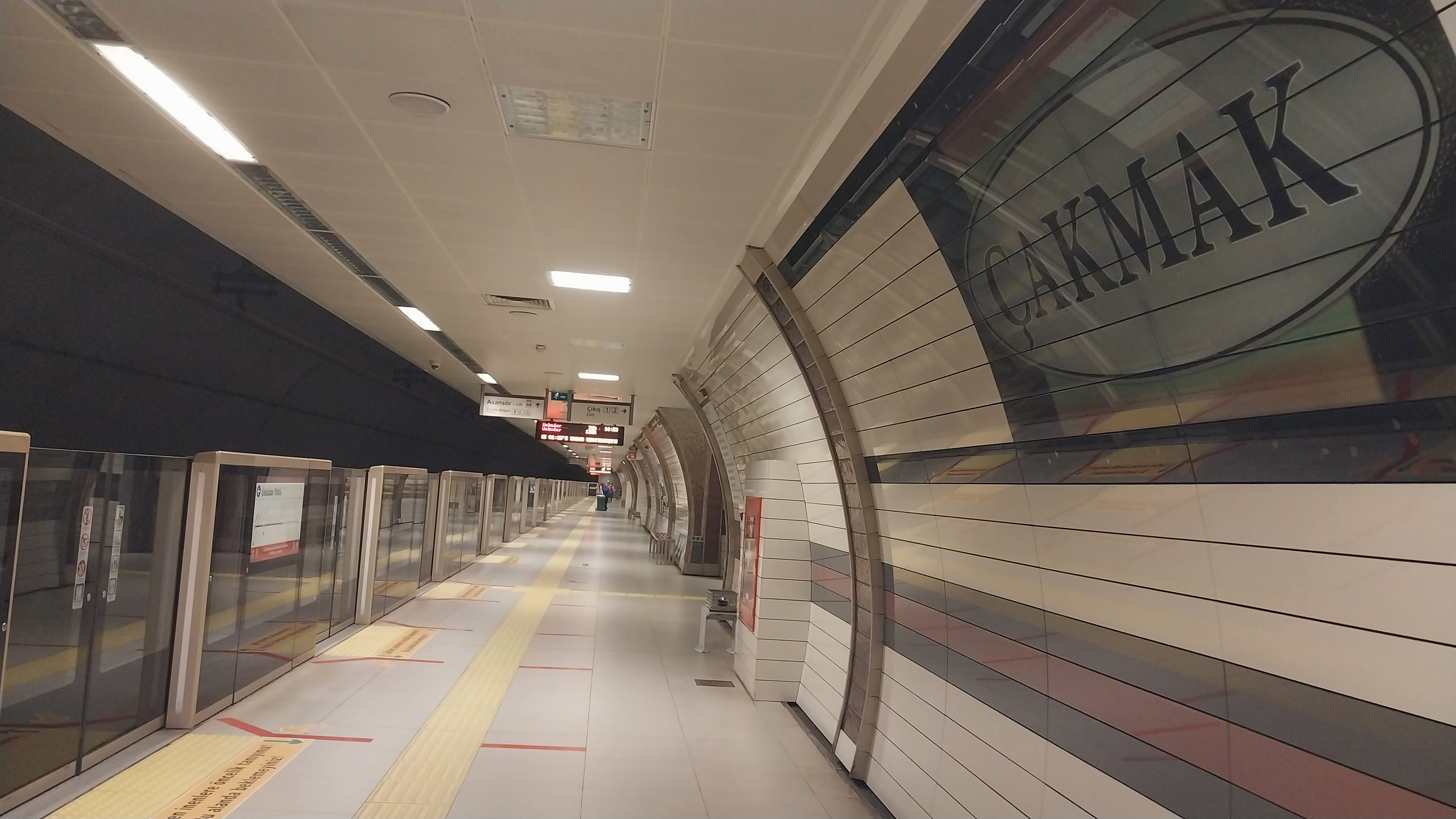

General information
- Location: Alemdağ Street, 34760 Dudullu Osb; Ümraniye, Istanbul
- Coordinates: 41.02098°N 29.12022°E
- System: Istanbul Metro rapid transit station
- Owner: Istanbul Metropolitan Municipality
- Operator: Metro Istanbul
- Line: M5
- Platforms: 1 island platform
- Tracks: 2
- Connections: İETT Bus:8K, 9Ç, 9Ş, 9Ü, 9ÜD, 10, 11H, 11P, 11V, 11ÇB, 13, 13H, 13TD, 14, 14B, 14ES, 14YE, 19D, 20Ü, 131, 131A, 131B, 131C, 131T, 131TD, 131YS, 131Ü, 138, 139, 139A, 320, 522; Istanbul Minibus: Üsküdar-Alemdağ, Ümraniye-Şahinbey, Üsküdar-Çekmeköy

Construction
- Structure type: Underground
- Accessible: Yes

History
- Opened: 21 October 2018 (7 years ago)
- Electrified: 1,500 V DC Overhead line

Services
| Preceding station | Istanbul Metro | Following station |
|---|---|---|
| Yamanevler towards Üsküdar | M5 Line | Ihlamurkuyu towards Sultanbeyli |
Location

Çakmak is an underground station on the M5 line of the Istanbul Metro in Ümraniye. The station is located on Alemdağ Street in the Saray quarter of Ümraniye. Connection to IETT city buses is available at street level.

The M5 line operates as fully automatic unattended train operation (UTO). The station consists of an island platform with two tracks. Since the M5 is an ATO line, protective gates on each side of the platform open only when a train is in the station.

Çakmak station was opened on 21 October 2018.

== Station layout ==
| P Platform level | Westbound | ← toward Üsküdar (Yamanevler) |
| P Platform level | Island platform, doors will open on the left |
| P Platform level | Eastbound | toward Sultanbeyli (Ihlamurkuyu) → |
