= Altunizade station =

Station of the Istanbul Metro

Altunizade
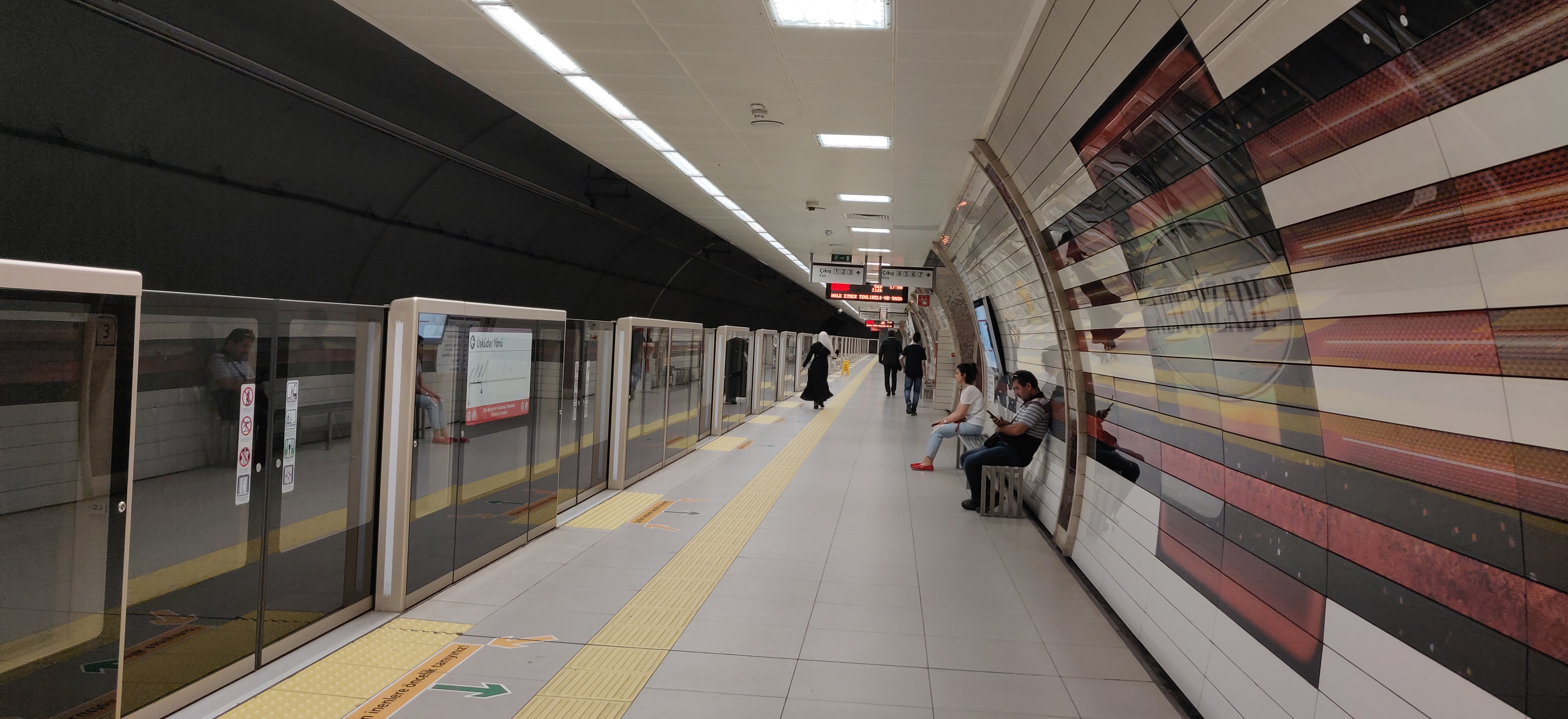

General information
- Location: Altunizade Kav., Hasanpaşa Mah., 34722; Üsküdar, Istanbul
- Coordinates: 41.0216°N 29.0485°E
- System: Istanbul Metro rapid transit station
- Owner: Istanbul Metropolitan Municipality
- Operator: Metro Istanbul
- Lines: M5; M14 (Dec 2026/early 2027)
- Platforms: 1 island platform
- Tracks: 2
- Connections: Metrobus: 34A, 34G, 34Z, 34AS at Altunizade; İETT Bus: 9, 9A, 9Ç, 9Ş, 9T, 9Ü, 9ÜD, 11, 11A, 11BE, 11C, 11D, 11E, 11EK, 11G, 11K, 11L, 11M, 11N, 11P, 11SA, 11ST, 11ÜS, 11V, 11Y, 12ÜS, 13, 13B, 13TD, 14, 14D, 14F, 14FD, 14K, 14M, 14R, 14Y, 14YK, 15F, 125, 129T, 139, 139A, 320, D1, MR9; Istanbul Minibus: Üsküdar-Alemdağ, Üsküdar-Tavukçuyolu Cd.-Alemdağ, Üsküdar-Esatpaşa

Construction
- Structure type: Underground
- Accessible: Yes

History
- Opened: M5: 15 December 2017 (8 years ago); M14: December 2026/early 2027
- Electrified: 1,500 V DC Overhead line

Services
Preceding station	Istanbul Metro	Following station
Bağlarbaşı towards Üsküdar	M5 Line	Kısıklı towards Sultanbeyli
Location

Altunizade is an underground station on the M5 line of the Istanbul Metro in Üsküdar. It is located beneath the Altunizade interchange in the Hasanpaşa, Üsküdar. Connection to the Istanbul Metrobus and IETT city buses is available from at street level.

The station consists of an island platform with two tracks. Since the M5 is an ATO line, protective gates on each side of the platform open only when a train is in the station. Altunizade station was opened on 15 December 2017, together with eight other stations between Üsküdar and Yamanevler.

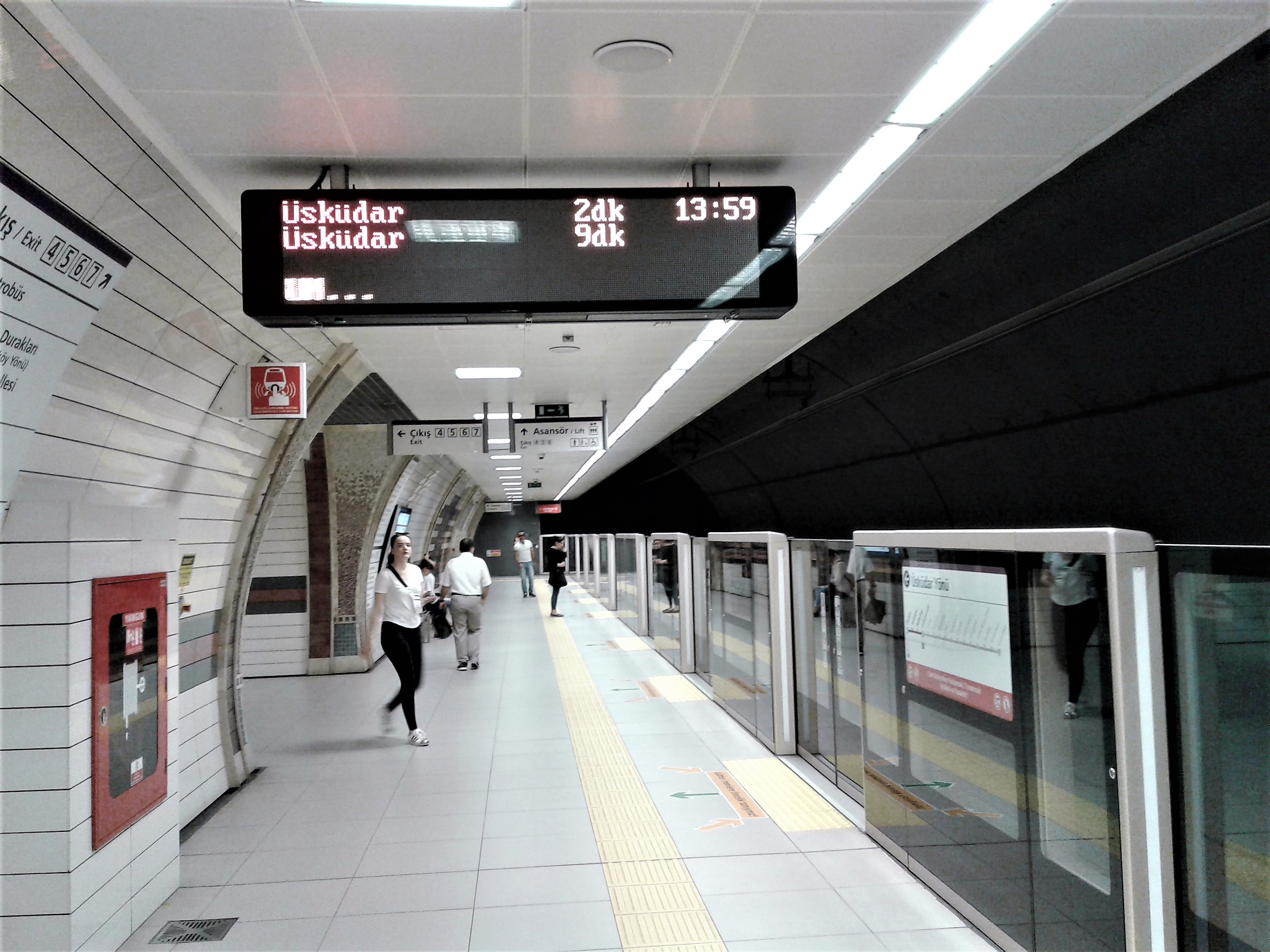
Üsküdar-bound platform of the Istanbul Metro station Altunizade of Metro Line 5.

== Station Layout ==
P Platform level	Westbound	← toward Üsküdar (Bağlarbaşı)
P Platform level	Island platform, doors will open on the left
P Platform level	Eastbound	toward Sultanbeyli (Kısıklı) →
