= Altınşehir station =

Metro station in Istanbul, Turkey

Altınşehir

General information
- Location: Cemil Meriç, Alemdağ Street 34776; Ümraniye, Istanbul
- Coordinates: 41.0164599°N 29.1399199°E
- System: Istanbul Metro rapid transit station
- Owner: Istanbul Metropolitan Municipality
- Operator: Metro Istanbul
- Line: M5
- Platforms: 1 island platform
- Tracks: 2
- Connections: İETT Bus:9Ç, 9Ş, 9Ü, 9ÜD, 11ÇB, 11G, 11P, 11V, 14, 14YE, 15SD, 19D, 131A, 131B, 131C, 131H, 131TD, 131Ü, 320, 522, 522B; Istanbul Minibus: Üsküdar-Alemdağ, Ümraniye-Şahinbey, Üsküdar-Çekmeköy

Construction
- Structure type: Underground
- Accessible: Yes

History
- Opened: 21 October 2018 (7 years ago)
- Electrified: 1,500 V DC Overhead line

Services
Preceding station	Istanbul Metro	Following station
Ihlamurkuyu towards Üsküdar	M5 Line	İmam Hatip Lisesi towards Sultanbeyli
Location

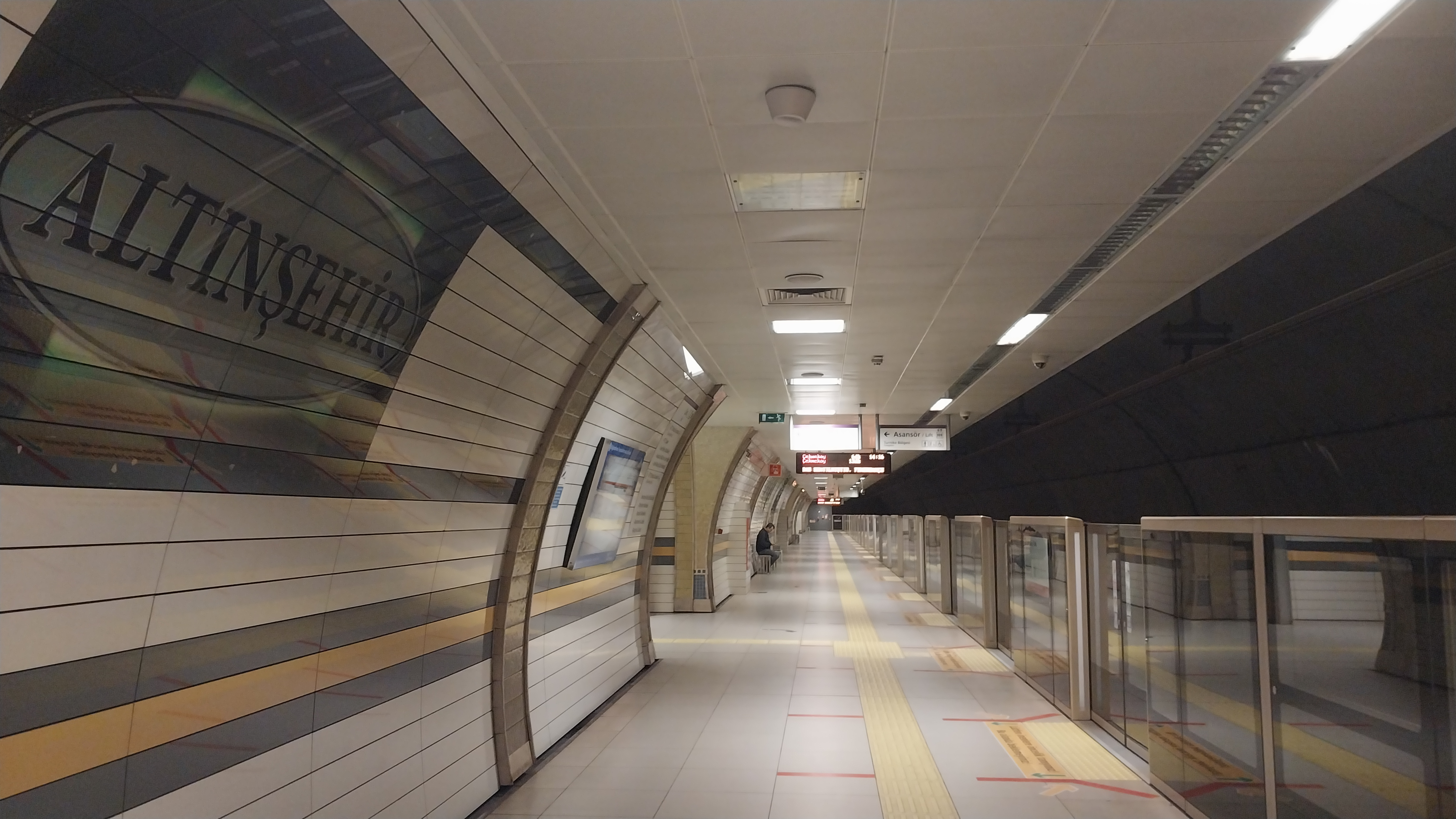
Altınşehir Metro Platform

Altınşehir is an underground station on the M5 line of the Istanbul Metro in Ümraniye. The station is located on Alemdağ Street in the Cemil Meriç neighborhood of Ümraniye. Connection to city buses is available at street level.

The M5 line operates as fully automatic unattended train operation. The station consists of an island platform with two tracks. Since the M5 is an automatic train operation line, protective gates on each side of the platform open only when a train is in the station.

Altınşehir station was opened on 21 October 2018.

== Station layout ==
Platform level	Westbound	← toward Üsküdar (Ihlamurkuyu)
Platform level	Island platform, doors will open on the left
Platform level	Eastbound	toward Sultanbeyli (İmam Hatip Lisesi) →
