= Necip Fazıl station =

Metro station in Istanbul, Turkey

Necip Fazıl
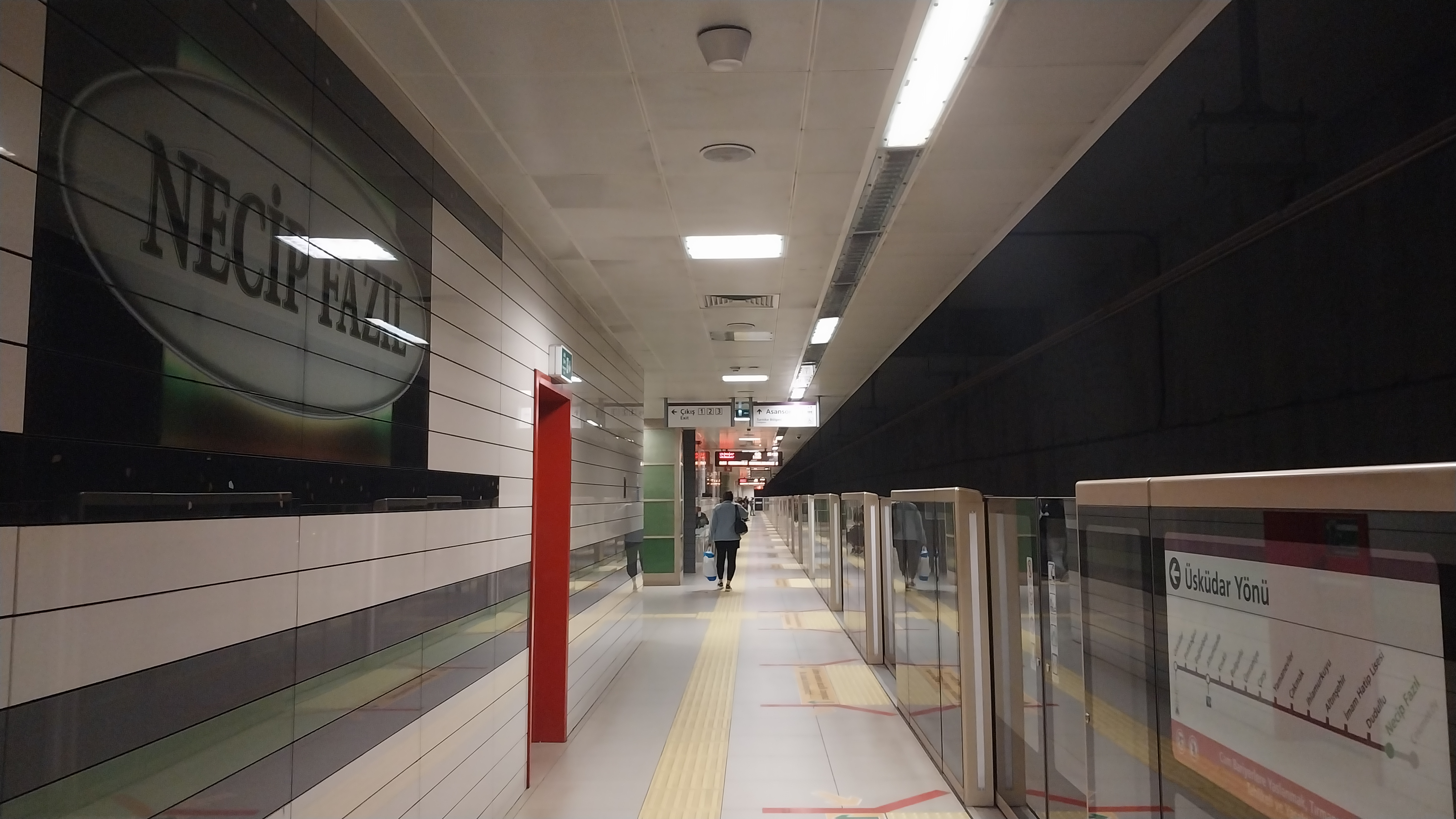
- Platform

General information
- Location: Necip Fazıl Neighborhood, Alemdağ Street 34773; Ümraniye, Istanbul
- Coordinates: 41.01639°N 29.179267°E
- System: Istanbul Metro rapid transit station
- Owner: Istanbul Metropolitan Municipality
- Operator: Metro Istanbul
- Line: M5
- Platforms: 1 island platform
- Tracks: 2
- Connections: İETT Bus: 11G, 11V, 11R, 14, 14A, 14AK, 14CE, 14T, 19S, 19SB, 131, 131A, 131B, 131H, 131T, 131TD, 131Ü, 522, 522B, ÇM41, ÇM43, ÇM44, UM60, UM61, UM62, UM73, UM74; Istanbul Minibus: Üsküdar-Alemdağ, Üsküdar-Tavukçuyolu Cd.-Alemdağ, Viaport-Dudullu, Sultanbeyli-Mecidiye-Dudullu, Sultanbeyli-Dudullu, Dudullu-Taşdelen-Abdurrahmangazi, Dudullu-Abdurrahmangazi, Dudullu-Madenler-Abdurrahmangazi

Construction
- Structure type: Underground
- Parking: No
- Cycle facilities: Yes
- Accessible: Yes

History
- Opened: 21 October 2018 (7 years ago)
- Electrified: 1,500 V DC Overhead line

Services
Preceding station	Istanbul Metro	Following station
Dudullu towards Üsküdar	M5 Line	Çekmeköy towards Sultanbeyli
Location

Necip Fazıl is an underground station on the M5 line of the Istanbul Metro in Ümraniye. The station is located on Alemdağ Street in the Necip Fazıl neighborhood of Ümraniye. Connection to IETT city buses is available at street level.

The M5 line operates as fully automatic unattended train operation (UTO). The station consists of an island platform with two tracks. Since the M5 is an ATO line, protective gates on each side of the platform open only when a train is in the station.

Necip Fazıl station was opened on 21 October 2018.

The station has 3 exits. There are 4 elevators and 12 escalators. Connection to Metrogarden Shopping Center can be provided from the station.

== Station layout ==
Z	Enter/Exit↓	
B1	Underpass →	Ticket Hall ↓ (← Mall)
B2		Platform

Platform level	Westbound	← toward Üsküdar (Dudullu)
Platform level	Island platform, doors will open on the left
Platform level	Eastbound	toward Sultanbeyli (Çekmeköy) →

== Connections ==
Connection to IETT city buses is available from at street level.

City buses; 9ÜD, 11R, 11SA, 11V, 14, 14A, 14AK, 14CE, 14T, 19S, 19SB, 131, 131A, 131B, 131C, 131H, 131T, 131TD, 131Ü, 522, 522B, ÇM41, UM40, UM60, UM61, UM73
