= Çarşı station =

Istanbul Metro station

Çarşı (M5) Çarşı (M12)
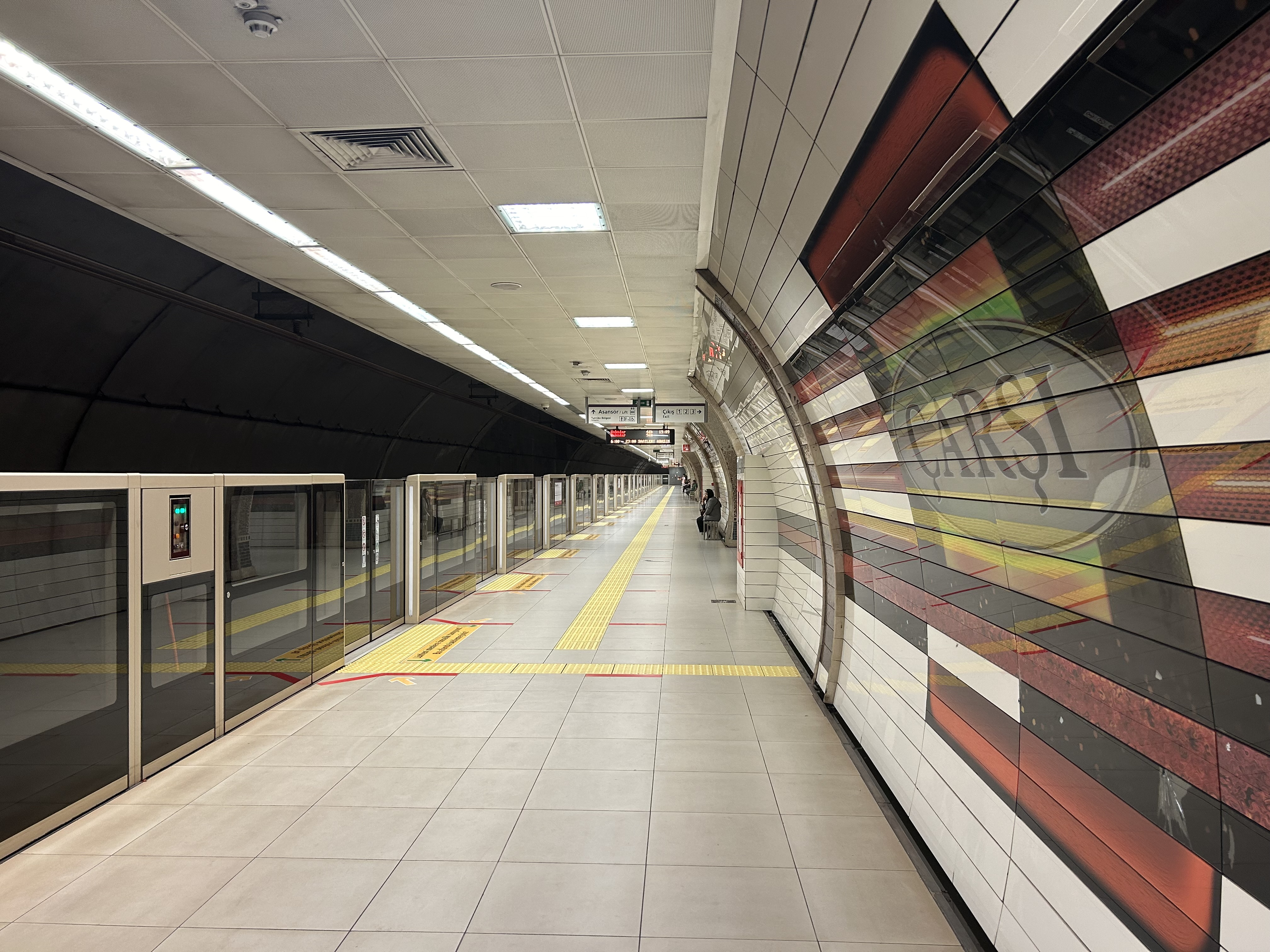

General information
- Location: Alemdağ Cd. & Tunaboyu Sk., Yaman Evler Mah., 34768; Ümraniye, Istanbul
- Coordinates: 41.0259°N 29.0968°E
- System: Istanbul Metro rapid transit station
- Owner: Istanbul Metropolitan Municipality
- Operator: Metro Istanbul
- Lines: M5; M12 (Under construction)
- Platforms: 1 island platform
- Tracks: 2
- Connections: İETT Bus: 9A, 9Ç, 9Ş, 9Ü, 9ÜD, 10, 11D, 11G, 11K, 11P, 11V, 13, 13B, 13H, 13TD, 14, 14B, 14DK, 14E, 14ES, 14K, 14YE, 19D, 20, 131, 131A, 131B, 131C, 131T, 131TD, 131YS, 131Ü, 138, 139, 139A, 320, 522; Istanbul Minibus: Kadıköy-Ümraniye, Ümraniye-Çekmeköy, Ümraniye-Şahinbey, Üsküdar-Alemdağ, Üsküdar-Tavukçuyolu Cd.-Alemdağ

Construction
- Structure type: Underground
- Accessible: Yes

History
- Opened: 15 December 2017 (8 years ago)
- Electrified: 1,500 V DC Overhead line

Services
Preceding station	Istanbul Metro	Following station
Ümraniye towards Üsküdar	M5 Line	Yamanevler towards Sultanbeyli
Future service
Atakent towards 60. Yıl Parkı	M12 Line (under construction)	Hastane towards Kazım Karabekir
Location

Çarşı is a Turkish underground station on the M5 line of the Istanbul Metro in Ümraniye. It is located beneath Alemdağ Avenue and Tunaboyu Street in the Yaman Evler neighborhood of Ümraniye. Connection to IETT city buses is available from at street level.

The station consists of an island platform with two tracks. Since the M5 is an ATO line, protective gates on each side of the platform open only when a train is in the station. Çarşı station was opened on 15 December 2017, together with eight other stations between Üsküdar and Yamanevler.

A second platform for the under construction M12 line is expected to open in December 2026.

== Station Layout ==
Platform level	Westbound	← toward Üsküdar (Ümraniye)
Platform level	Island platform, doors will open on the left
Platform level	Eastbound	toward Sultanbeyli (Yamanevler) →
