= Ihlamurkuyu station =

Metro station in Istanbul, Turkey

Ihlamurkuyu
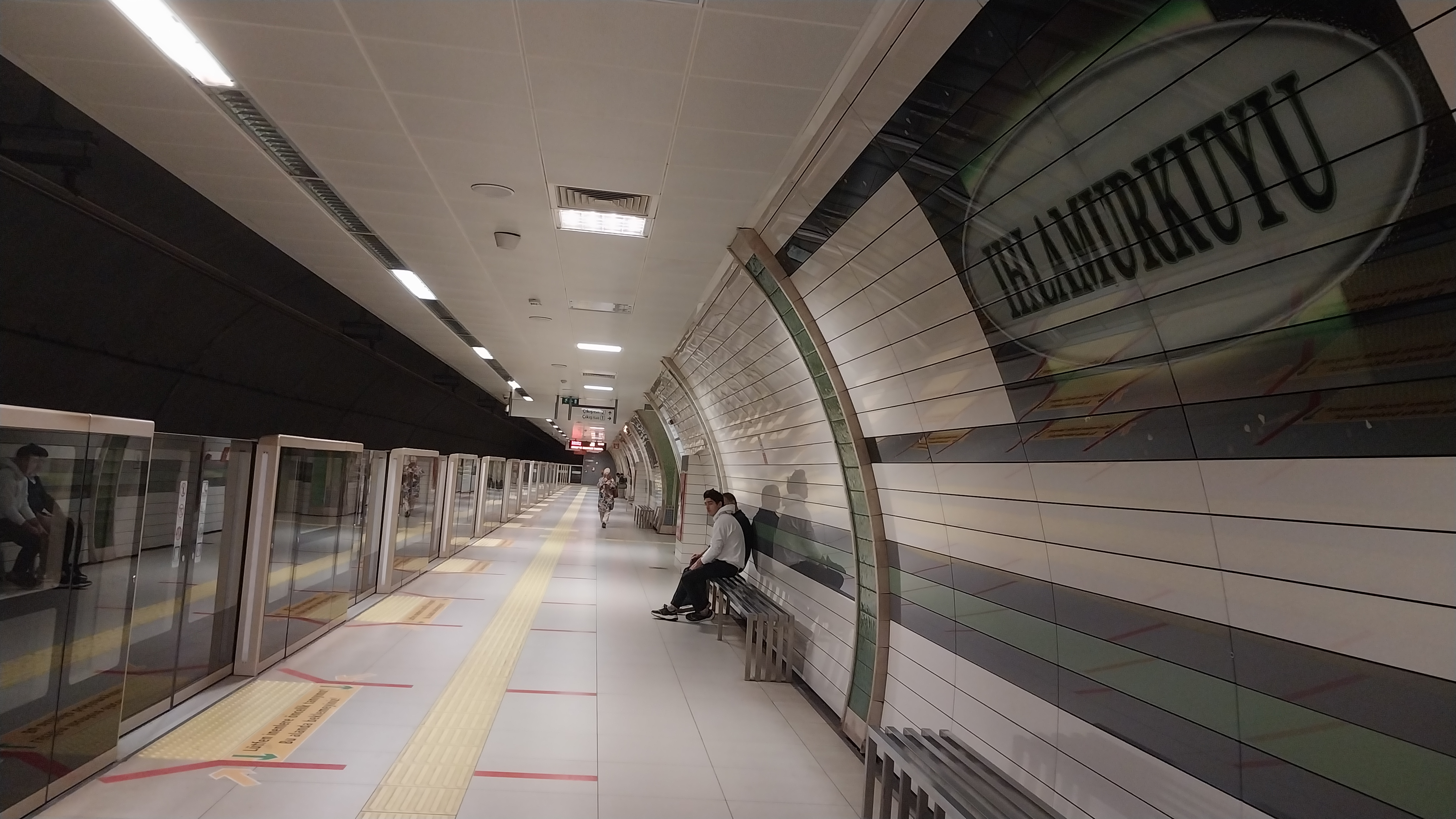
- Train platform in Ihlamurkuyu Metro in 2022

General information
- Location: Ihlamurkuyu, Alemdağ Street 34771; Ümraniye, Istanbul
- Coordinates: 41.01975°N 29.130667°E
- System: Istanbul Metro rapid transit station
- Owner: Istanbul Metropolitan Municipality
- Operator: Metro Istanbul
- Line: M5
- Platforms: 1 island platform
- Tracks: 2
- Connections: İETT Bus:8K, 9, 9Ç, 9Ş, 9Ü, 9ÜD, 11ÇB, 11G, 11H, 11P, 11V, 13TD, 14, 14B, 15SD, 19D, 20Ü, 14YE, 11ÇB, 122C, 131, 131A, 131B, 131C, 131H, 131TD, 131Ü, 139T, 320, 522, 522B, E-3; Istanbul Minibus: Üsküdar-Alemdağ, Ümraniye-Şahinbey, Üsküdar-Çekmeköy

Construction
- Structure type: Underground
- Accessible: Yes

History
- Opened: 21 October 2018 (7 years ago)
- Electrified: 1,500 V DC Overhead line

Services
Preceding station	Istanbul Metro	Following station
Çakmak towards Üsküdar	M5 Line	Altınşehir towards Sultanbeyli
Location

Ihlamurkuyu is an underground station on the M5 line of the Istanbul Metro in Ümraniye. The station is located on Alemdağ Street in the Ihlamurkuyu neighborhood of Ümraniye. Connection to IETT city buses is available at street level.

The M5 line operates as fully automatic unattended train operation (UTO). The station consists of an island platform with two tracks. Since the M5 is an ATO line, protective gates on each side of the platform open only when a train is in the station.

Ihlamurkuyu station was opened on 21 October 2018.

== Station layout ==
P Platform level	Westbound	← toward Üsküdar (Çakmak)
P Platform level	Island platform, doors will open on the left
P Platform level	Eastbound	toward Sultanbeyli (Altınşehir) →
