= Bulgurlu station =

Station of the Istanbul Metro

Bulgurlu
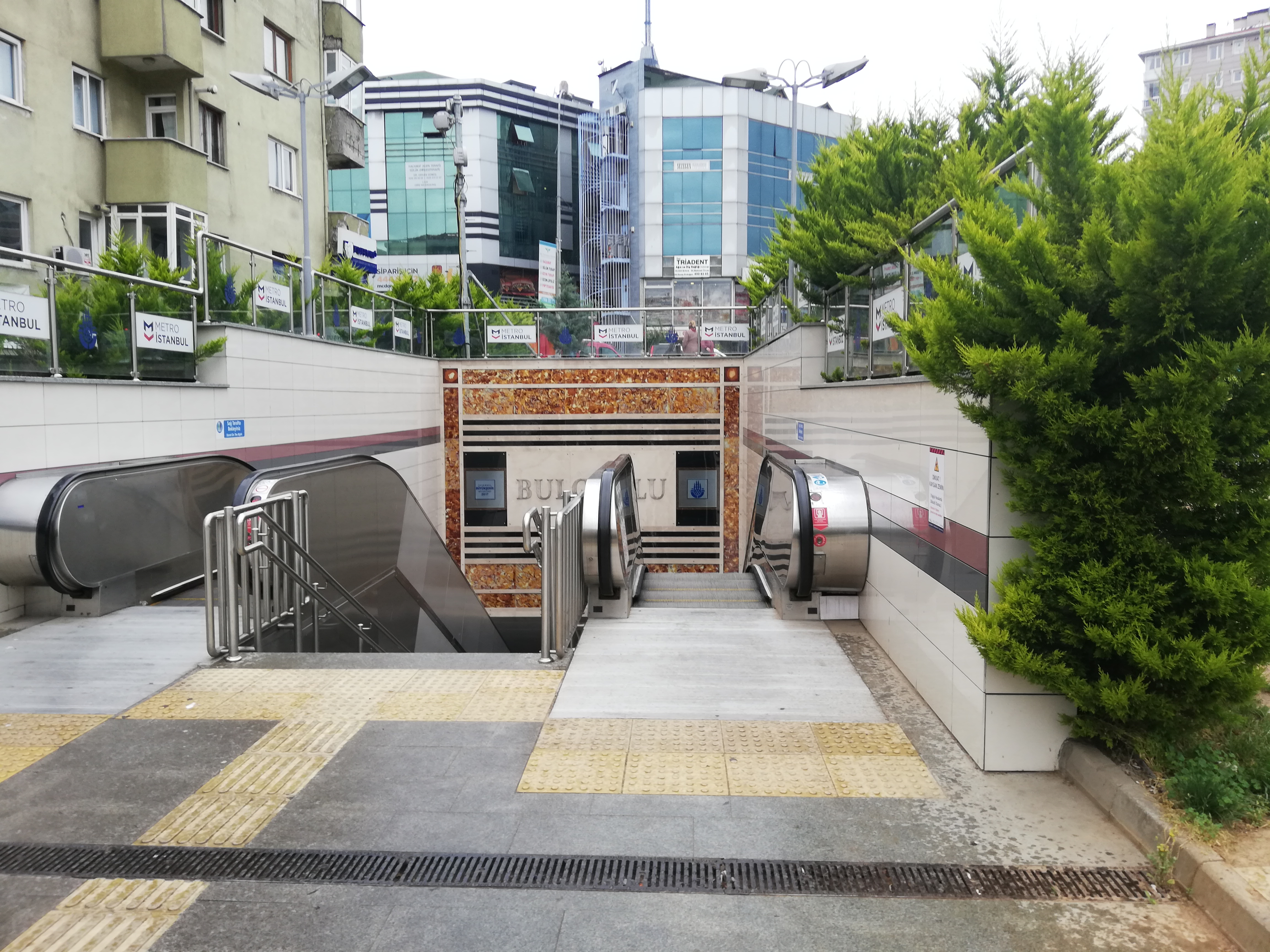

General information
- Location: Bulgurlu Cd. & Gürpınar Cd., Bulgurlu Mah., 34696; Üsküdar, Istanbul
- Coordinates: 41.0246°N 29.0847°E
- System: Istanbul Metro rapid transit station
- Owner: Istanbul Metropolitan Municipality
- Operator: Metro Istanbul
- Line: M5
- Platforms: 1 island platform
- Tracks: 2
- Connections: İETT Bus: 6, 8E, 9K, 11E, 11EK, 11L, 11M, 11N, 14B, 14DK, 14E, 14ES, 15BK, 15ÇK, 15SK, 15YK; Istanbul Minibus: Kadıköy-Bulgurlu, Kadıköy-Ümraniye, Üsküdar-Esatpaşa

Construction
- Structure type: Underground
- Accessible: Yes

History
- Opened: 15 December 2017 (8 years ago)
- Electrified: 1,500 V DC Overhead line

Services
Preceding station	Istanbul Metro	Following station
Kısıklı towards Üsküdar	M5 Line	Ümraniye towards Sultanbeyli
Location

Bulgurlu is an underground station on the M5 line of the Istanbul Metro in east Üsküdar. It is located beneath Alemdağ and Gürpınar Avenues in the Bulgurlu neighborhood of Üsküdar. Connection to IETT city buses is available from at street level, one block south.

The station consists of an island platform with two tracks. Since the M5 is an ATO line, protective gates on each side of the platform open only when a train is in the station. Bulgurlu station was opened on 15 December 2017, together with eight other stations between Üsküdar and Yamanevler.

== Station Layout ==
P Platform level	Westbound	← toward Üsküdar (Kısıklı)
P Platform level	Island platform, doors will open on the left
P Platform level	Eastbound	toward Sultanbeyli (Ümraniye) →
