= Bağlarbaşı station =

Station of the Istanbul Metro

Bağlarbaşı
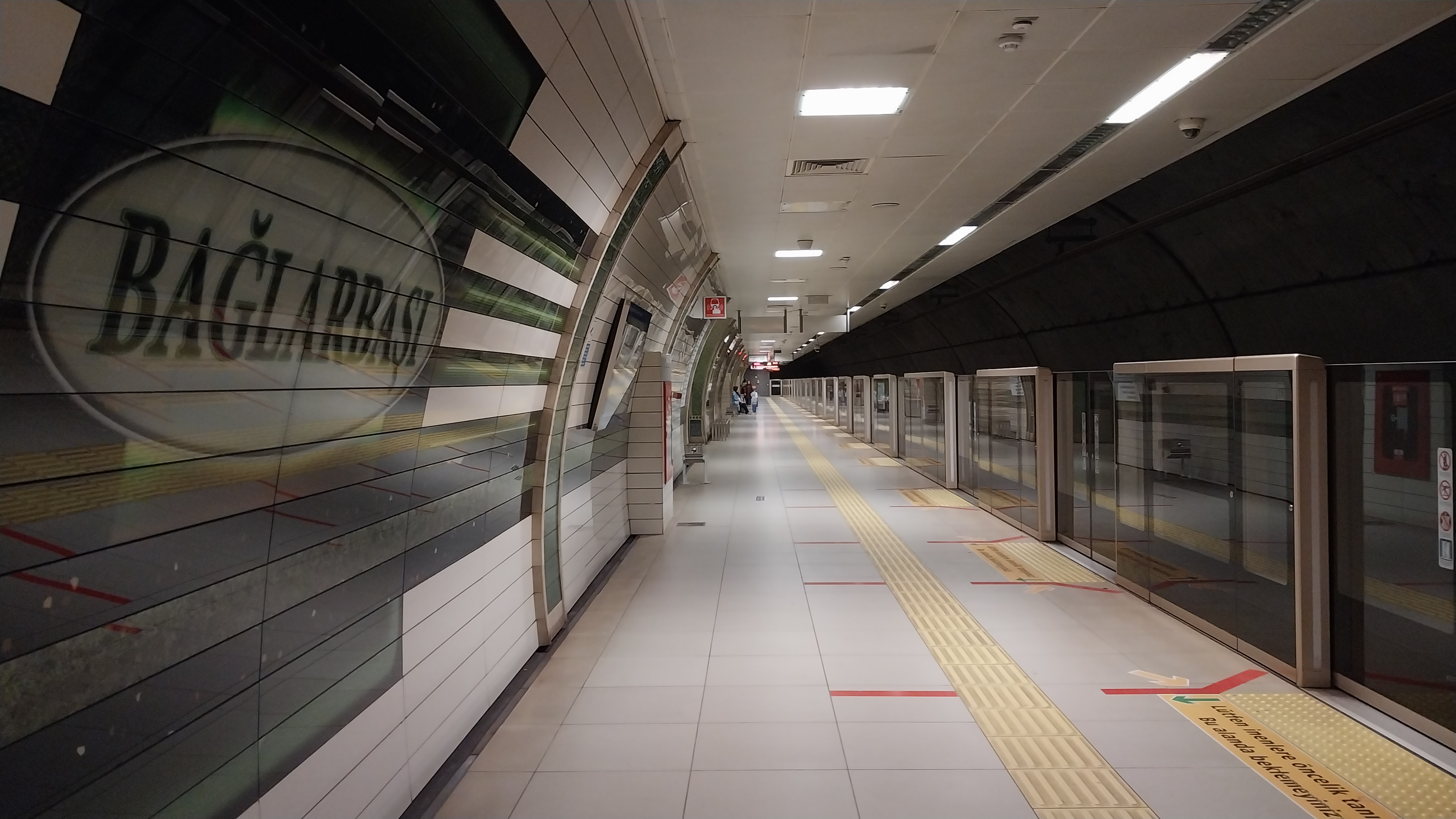

General information
- Location: Nuhkuyusuyu Cd., Altunizade Mah., 34662; Üsküdar, Istanbul
- Coordinates: 41.0213°N 29.0355°E
- System: Istanbul Metro rapid transit station
- Owner: Istanbul Metropolitan Municipality
- Operator: Metro Istanbul
- Line: M5
- Platforms: 1 island platform
- Tracks: 2
- Connections: İETT Bus: 2, 3, 9, 9A, 9Ç, 9Ş, 9Ü, 9ÜD, 11A, 11BE, 11C, 11D, 11E, 11EK, 11ES, 11G, 11K, 11L, 11M, 11N, 11P, 11ST, 11Ü, 11ÜS, 11Y, 12A, 12ÜS, 13, 13AB, 13B, 13TD, 14, 14D, 14F, 14K, 14M, 14R, 14Y, 14YK, 15F, 125, 129T, 139, 139A, 320, 500A, D1, MR9; Istanbul Minibus: Kadıköy-Bağlarbaşı, Kadıköy-Çekmeköy, Üsküdar-Nuh Kuyusu

Construction
- Structure type: Underground
- Accessible: Yes

History
- Opened: 15 December 2017 (8 years ago)
- Electrified: 1,500 V DC Overhead line

Services
Preceding station	Istanbul Metro	Following station
Fıstıkağacı towards Üsküdar	M5 Line	Altunizade towards Sultanbeyli
Location

Bağlarbaşı is an underground station on the M5 line of the Istanbul Metro in Üsküdar. It is located beneath Nuhsuyukuyu Avenue in Altunizade, Üsküdar. Connection to IETT city buses is available from at street level.

The station consists of an island platform with two tracks. Since the M5 is an ATO line, protective gates on each side of the platform open only when a train is in the station. Bağlarbaşı station was opened on 15 December 2017, together with eight other stations between Üsküdar and Yamanevler.

== Station layout ==
P Platform level	Westbound	← toward Üsküdar (Fıstıkağacı)
P Platform level	Island platform, doors will open on the left
P Platform level	Eastbound	toward Sultanbeyli (Altunizade) →
