= Kısıklı station =

Istanbul Metro station beneath Kısıklı Avenue

Kısıklı
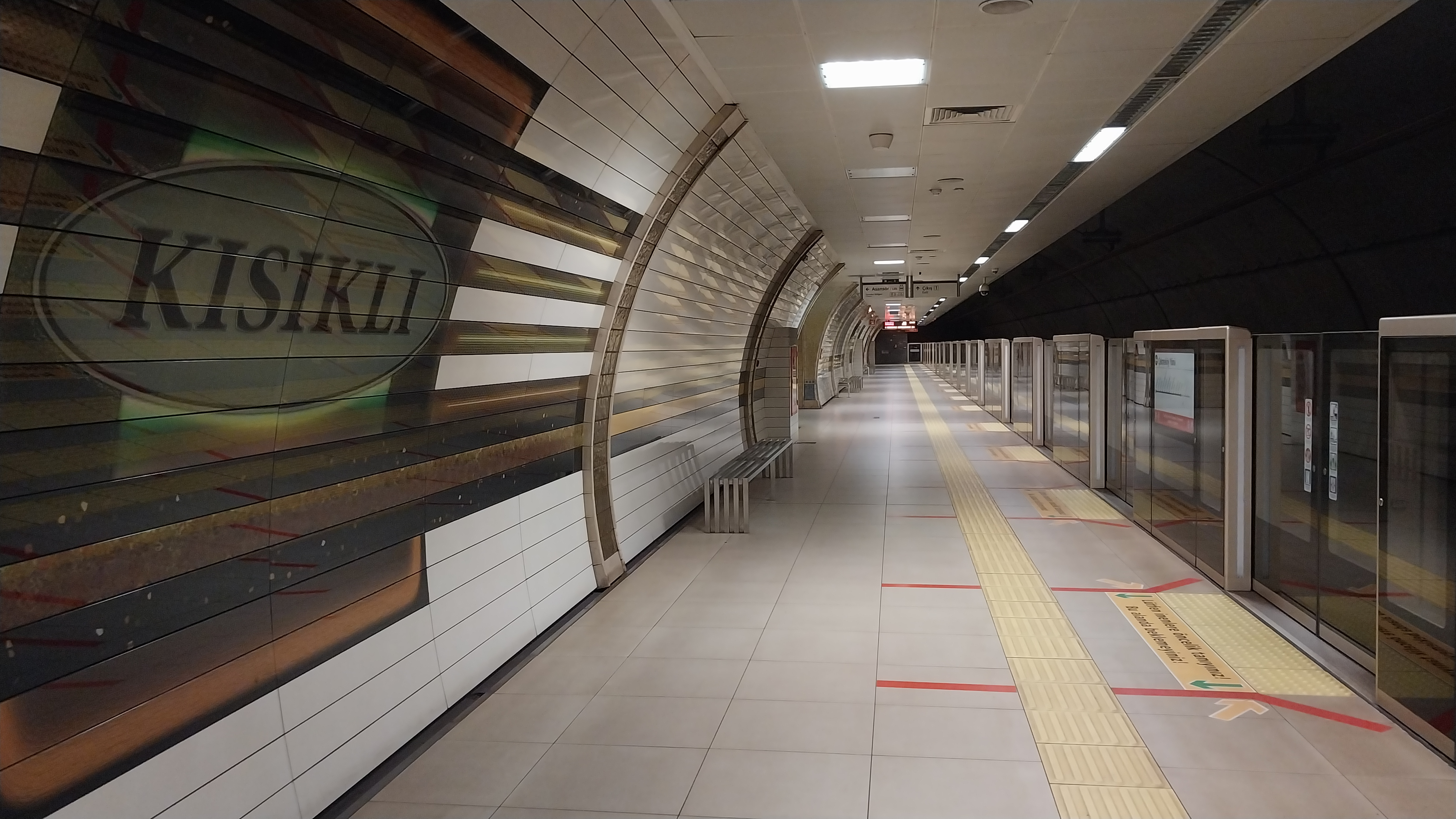

General information
- Location: Kısıklı Cd., Küçük Çamlıca Mah., 34696; Üsküdar, Istanbul
- Coordinates: 41.0219°N 29.0624°E
- System: Istanbul Metro rapid transit station
- Owner: Istanbul Metropolitan Municipality
- Operator: Metro Istanbul
- Line: M5
- Platforms: 1 island platform
- Tracks: 2
- Connections: İETT Bus: 9, 9A, 9Ç, 9Ş, 9T, 9Ü, 9ÜD, 11, 11A, 11D, 11E, 11EK, 11G, 11K, 11L, 11M, 11N, 11P, 11SA, 11ST, 11ÜS, 11V, 11Y, 12ÜS, 13, 13AB, 13B, 13TD, 14, 14D, 14F, 14FD, 14K, 14R, 14Y, 14YK, 129T, 320, 522, D1, MR9, TB2; Istanbul Minibus: Üsküdar-Alemdağ, Üsküdar-Tavukçuyolu Cd.-Alemdağ, Üsküdar-Esatpaşa

Construction
- Structure type: Underground
- Accessible: Yes

History
- Opened: 15 December 2017 (8 years ago)
- Electrified: 1,500 V DC Overhead line

Services
Preceding station	Istanbul Metro	Following station
Altunizade towards Üsküdar	M5 Line	Bulgurlu towards Sultanbeyli
Location

Kısıklı is an underground station on the M5 line of the Istanbul Metro in east Üsküdar. It is located beneath Kısıklı Avenue in the Küçük Çamlıca neighborhood of Üsküdar, on the southern foot of the Büyük Çamlıca Hill. Connection to IETT city buses is available from at street level.

The station consists of an island platform with two tracks. Since the M5 is an ATO line, protective gates on each side of the platform open only when a train is in the station. Kısıklı station was opened on 15 December 2017, together with eight other stations between Üsküdar and Yamanevler.

== Station Layout ==
P Platform level	Westbound	← toward Üsküdar (Altunizade)
P Platform level	Island platform, doors will open on the left
P Platform level	Eastbound	toward Sultanbeyli (Bulgurlu) →
