= Yamanevler station =

Station of the Istanbul Metro

Yamanevler
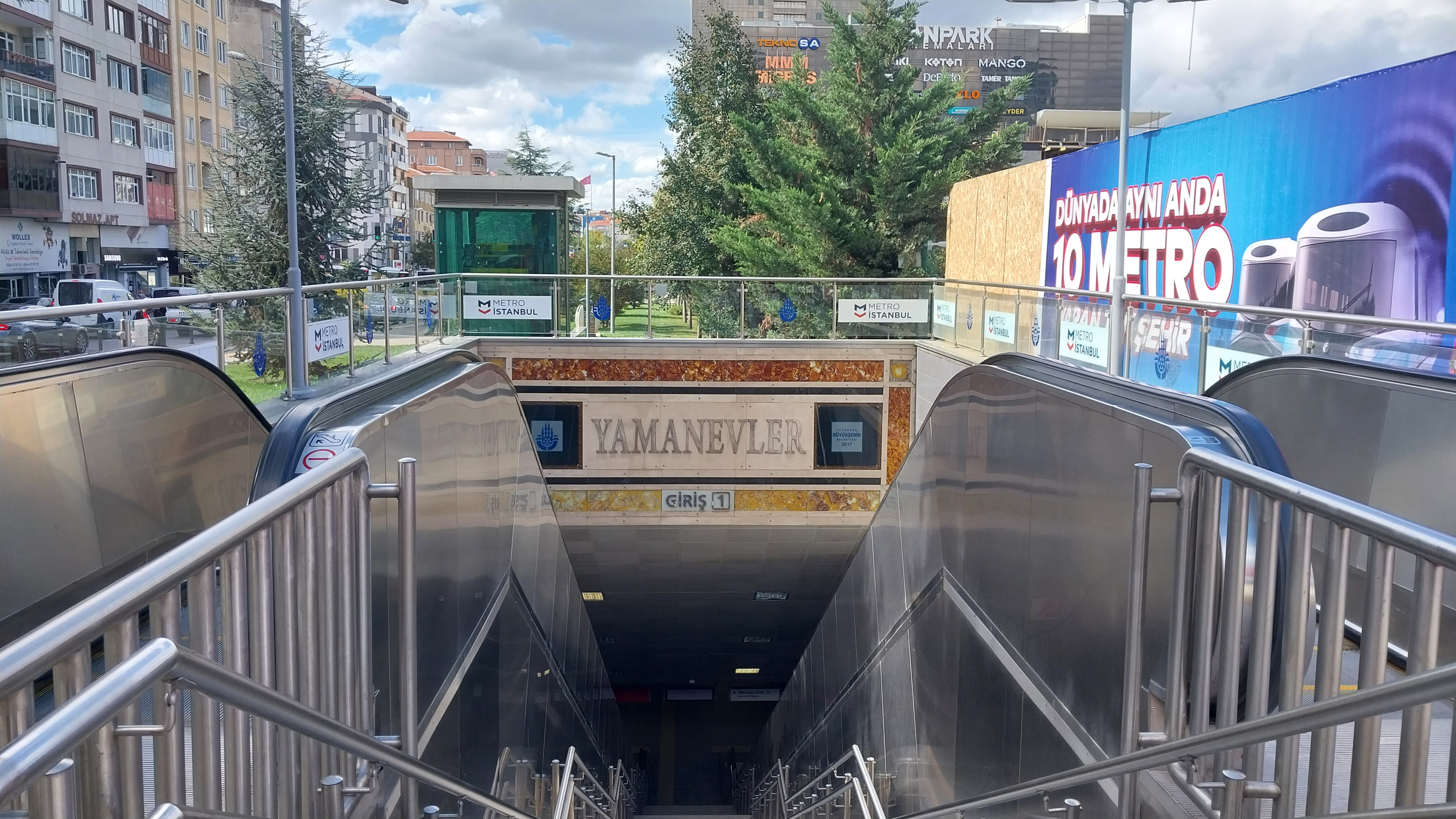
- Yamanevier Entrance

General information
- Location: Alemdağ Cd., Atakent Mah., 34760; Ümraniye, Istanbul
- Coordinates: 41.0246°N 29.1054°E
- System: Istanbul Metro rapid transit station
- Owner: Istanbul Metropolitan Municipality
- Operator: Istanbul Metro
- Line: M5
- Platforms: 1 island platform
- Tracks: 2
- Connections: İETT Bus: 9A, 9Ç, 9Ş, 9Ü, 9ÜD, 10, 11G, 11H, 11P, 11V, 11ÇB, 13, 13B, 13H, 13TD, 14, 14B, 14E, 14ES, 14YE, 19D, 131, 131A, 131B, 131C, 131TD, 131YS, 131Ü, 138, 320, 522; Istanbul Minibus: Kadıköy-Ümraniye, Çakmak-Kazım Karabekir, Ümraniye-Çekmeköy, Ümraniye-Şahinbey, Üsküdar-Alemdağ, Üsküdar-Tavukçuyolu Cd.-Alemdağ

Construction
- Structure type: Underground
- Accessible: Yes

History
- Opened: 15 December 2017 (8 years ago)
- Electrified: 1,500 V DC Overhead line

Services
Preceding station	Istanbul Metro	Following station
Çarşı towards Üsküdar	M5 Line	Çakmak towards Sultanbeyli
Location

Yamanevler is an underground station of the M5 line of the Istanbul Metro in Üsküdar. It is located beneath Alemdağ Avenue in the Atatkent neighborhood of Ümraniye. Connection to IETT city buses is available from at street level. From its opening in December 2017 until October 2018, Yamanevler station was the eastern terminus of the M5 until the line was extended further to Çekmeköy.

The station consists of an island platform with two tracks. Since the M5 is an ATO line, protective gates on each side of the platform open only when a train is in the station. Yamanevler station was opened on 15 December 2017, together with eight other stations from Üsküdar.

== Station layout ==
P Platform level	Westbound	← toward Üsküdar (Çarşı)
P Platform level	Island platform, doors will open on the left
P Platform level	Westbound	toward Sultanbeyli (Çakmak) →
