= Fıstıkağacı station =

Station of the Istanbul Metro

Fıstıkağacı
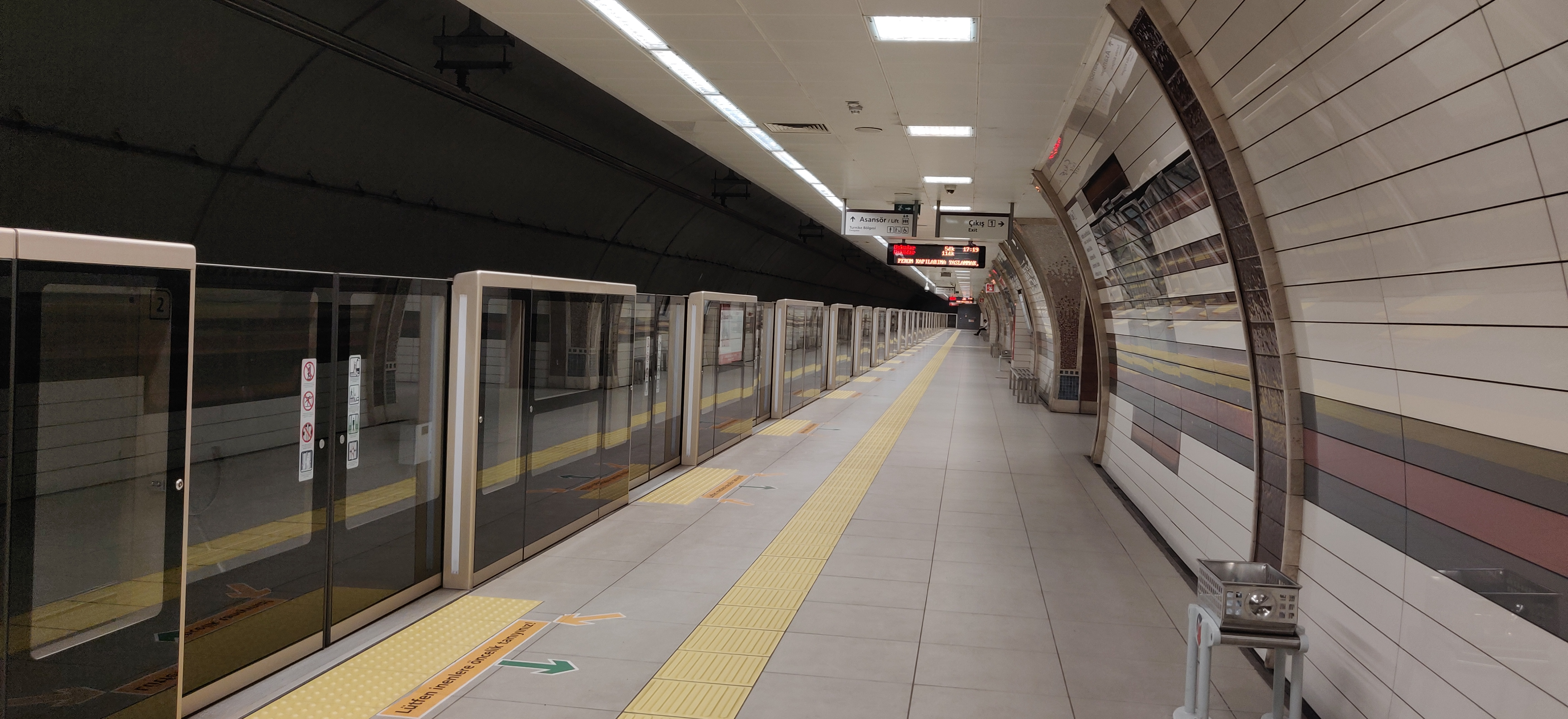

General information
- Location: Cumhuriyet Cd. 49, İcadiye Mah., 34674; Üsküdar, Istanbul
- Coordinates: 41.0281°N 29.0286°E
- System: Istanbul Metro rapid transit station
- Owner: Istanbul Metropolitan Municipality
- Operator: Metro Istanbul
- Line: M5
- Platforms: 1 island platform
- Tracks: 2
- Connections: İETT Bus: 2, 9, 9Ç, 9Ş, 9Ü, 9ÜD, 11A, 11BE, 11C, 11D, 11E, 11EK, 11ES, 11G, 11K, 11L, 11M, 11N, 11ST, 11T, 11Ü, 11Ü, 11ÜS, 11Y, 12A, 12ÜS, 139, 139A, 320, D1; Istanbul Minibus: Üsküdar-Alemdağ, Üsküdar-Esatpaşa, Üsküdar-Tavukçuyolu Cd.-Alemdağ

Construction
- Structure type: Underground
- Accessible: Yes

History
- Opened: 15 December 2017 (8 years ago)
- Electrified: 1,500 V DC Overhead line

Services
Preceding station	Istanbul Metro	Following station
Üsküdar Terminus	M5 Line	Bağlarbaşı towards Sultanbeyli
Location

Fıstıkağacı is an underground station on the M5 line of the Istanbul Metro in Üsküdar. It is located beneath Cumhuriyet Avenue in İcadiye, Üsküdar. Connection to IETT city buses is available from at street level.

The station consists of an island platform with two tracks. Since the M5 is an ATO line, protective gates on each side of the platform open only when a train is in the station. Fıstıkağacı station was opened on 15 December 2017, together with eight other stations between Üsküdar and Yamanevler.

== Station Layout ==
P Platform level	Westbound	← toward Üsküdar (terminus)
P Platform level	Island platform, doors will open on the left
P Platform level	Eastbound	toward Sultanbeyli (Bağlarbaşı) →
