= M14 (Istanbul Metro) =

Istanbul Metro line under construction

M14 Altunizade – Ümraniye Spor Köyü

Overview
- Status: Under construction Altunizade - Bosna Bulvarı; Projected; Bosna Bulvarı - Ümraniye Spor Köyü
- Owner: Ministry of Transport and Infrastructure
- Line number: M14
- Locale: Istanbul, Turkey
- Termini: Altunizade; Ümraniye Spor Köyü
- Stations: 8 (4 under construction)
- Website: M14

Service
- Type: Rapid transit
- System: Istanbul Metro
- Operator(s): Ministry of Transport and Infrastructure
- Depot(s): Altunizade, Ümraniye Spor Köyü

History
- Planned opening: 2027

Technical
- Line length: 4.5 km (2.8 mi) (Phase 1)

The M14, officially referred to as the M14 Altunizade – Ümraniye Spor Köyü metro line is a rapid transit line project on the Anatolian side of Istanbul, with Altunizade as the first station and Ümraniye Spor Köyü (Ümraniye Sports Village) as the last station.

On 28 December 2023, Minister of Transport and Infrastructure Abdulkadir Uraloğlu announced that the 4.5 km first phase of the project between Altunizade and Bosna Bulvarı would be completed by 2027.

== History ==
When the project first came out, it was stated that the metro line would be built as a mini metro line between Kısıklı and Çamlıca Mosque, just like the M6 Levent - Boğaziçi University - Hisarüstü metro line. Though later on it was announced that the project got cancelled. After the Istanbul Metropolitan Municipality announced that this project was canceled, the Ministry of Transport and Infrastructure revised the project to be a standard metro line and undertook the construction of the project.

The line was previously planned to interchange with Line M12 at Kâzım Karabekir station. On 8 December 2023, Kâzım Karabekir station was canceled, 5 stations were added to the line and it was extended to Küçüksu. On 6 April 2024, the extension project was revised again and the Kazım Karabekir extension was re-added to the line. According to the new project, the line will fork from Yavuztürk station, of which one branch will first go to Bahçelievler (later Küçüksu) and the other branch will go to Kazım Karabekir. The construction of the project was undertaken by the Ministry of Transport and Infrastructure with the decision of the Presidency. On 21 March 2025, Minister of Transport Abdülkadir Uraloğlu announced that the Kazım Karabekir branch would be extended to Ümraniye Sports Village. The Küçüksu extension was cancelled in March 2026 because the Ümraniye-Beykoz Line, designed by the Istanbul Metropolitan Municipality, was announced.

The construction tender for the Kazım Karabekir - Ümraniye Sports Village section of the line was signed with the joint venture of Çelikler Contracting-Fernas Construction-Güryapı Restoration for 30,051,545,070 Turkish Lira.

== Stations ==
| No | Station | District | Transfer | Type | Notes |
|---|---|---|---|---|---|
| 1 | Altunizade | Üsküdar | ・ İETT Bus: 9, 9A, 9Ç, 9Ş, 9T, 9Ü, 9ÜD, 11, 11A, 11BE, 11C, 11D, 11E, 11EK, 11G, 11K, 11L, 11M, 11N, 11P, 11SA, 11ST, 11ÜS, 11V, 11Y, 12ÜS, 13, 13B, 13TD, 14, 14D, 14F, 14FD, 14K, 14M, 14R, 14Y, 14YK, 15F, 125, 129T, 139, 139A, 320, D1, MR9 | Underground | İZÜ Altunizade Campus |
| 2 | Ferah Mahallesi | Üsküdar | İETT Bus: | Underground | Çamlıca Tower・Small Çamlıca Hill |
| 3 | Çamlıca Camii | Üsküdar | İETT Bus: | Underground | Big Çamlıca Hill・Big Çamlıca Mosque |
| 4 | Bosna Bulvarı | Üsküdar | İETT Bus: | Underground | Mehmet Akif Ersoy Street |
↓↓ Planned ↓↓
| 5 | Yavuztürk Mahallesi | Üsküdar | İETT Bus: | Underground | Karadeniz Street |
| 6 | Kâzım Karabekir | Ümraniye | İETT Bus: | Underground | Adem Yavuz Street |
| 7 | Topağacı Mahallesi | Ümraniye | İETT Bus: | Underground | Beytullah Eroğlu Sports Complex・Kazım Karabekir Park |
| 8 | Ümraniye Spor Köyü | Ümraniye | İETT Bus: | Underground | Ümraniye Municipality City Stadium・Hekimbaşı Sports and Social Facilities |
