= M5 (Istanbul Metro) =

Rapid transit line of the Istanbul Metro system

M5 Üsküdar–Sultanbeyli
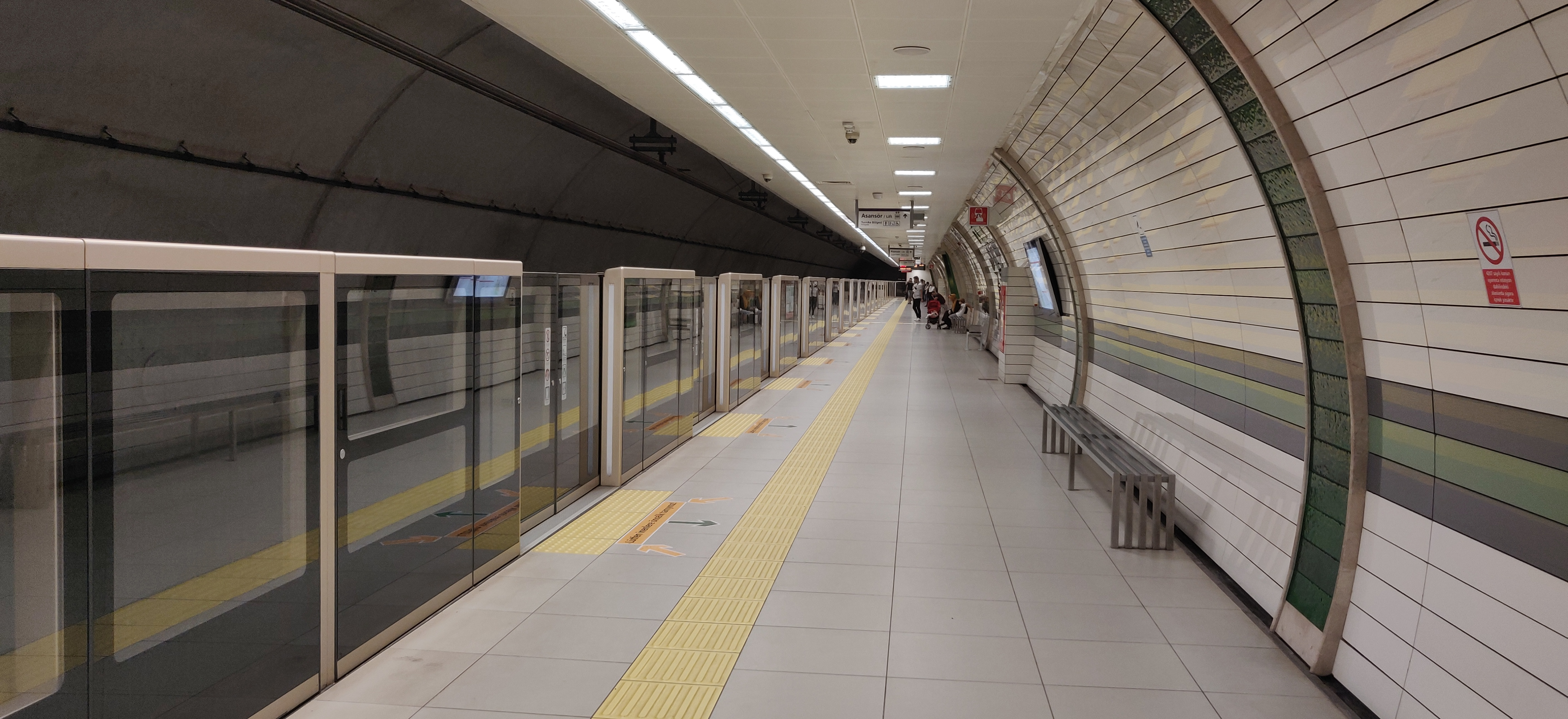
- Ümraniye Station

Overview
- Status: Operational; Üsküdar - Sultanbeyli; Projected; Sultanbeyli - Kurtköy YHT/ViaPort
- Owner: Istanbul Metropolitan Municipality
- Locale: Istanbul, Turkey
- Termini: Üsküdar; Sultanbeyli
- Stations: 24

Service
- Type: Rapid Transit
- System: Istanbul Metro
- Services: 1
- Route number: M5
- Operator: Metro Istanbul A.Ş.
- Depot: Behiç Erkin Depot
- Rolling stock: 126 Mitsubishi-CAF 140 Hyundai Rotem; 6 carriages per trainset

History
- Opened: 15 December 2017 (8 years ago)
- Last extension: 22 May 2026 (4 months ago)

Technical
- Line length: 30.9 km (19.2 mi)
- Number of tracks: 2
- Track gauge: 1,435 mm (4 ft 8 1/2 in) standard gauge
- Electrification: 750 V DC Overhead line
- Operating speed: 90 km/h (56 mph)

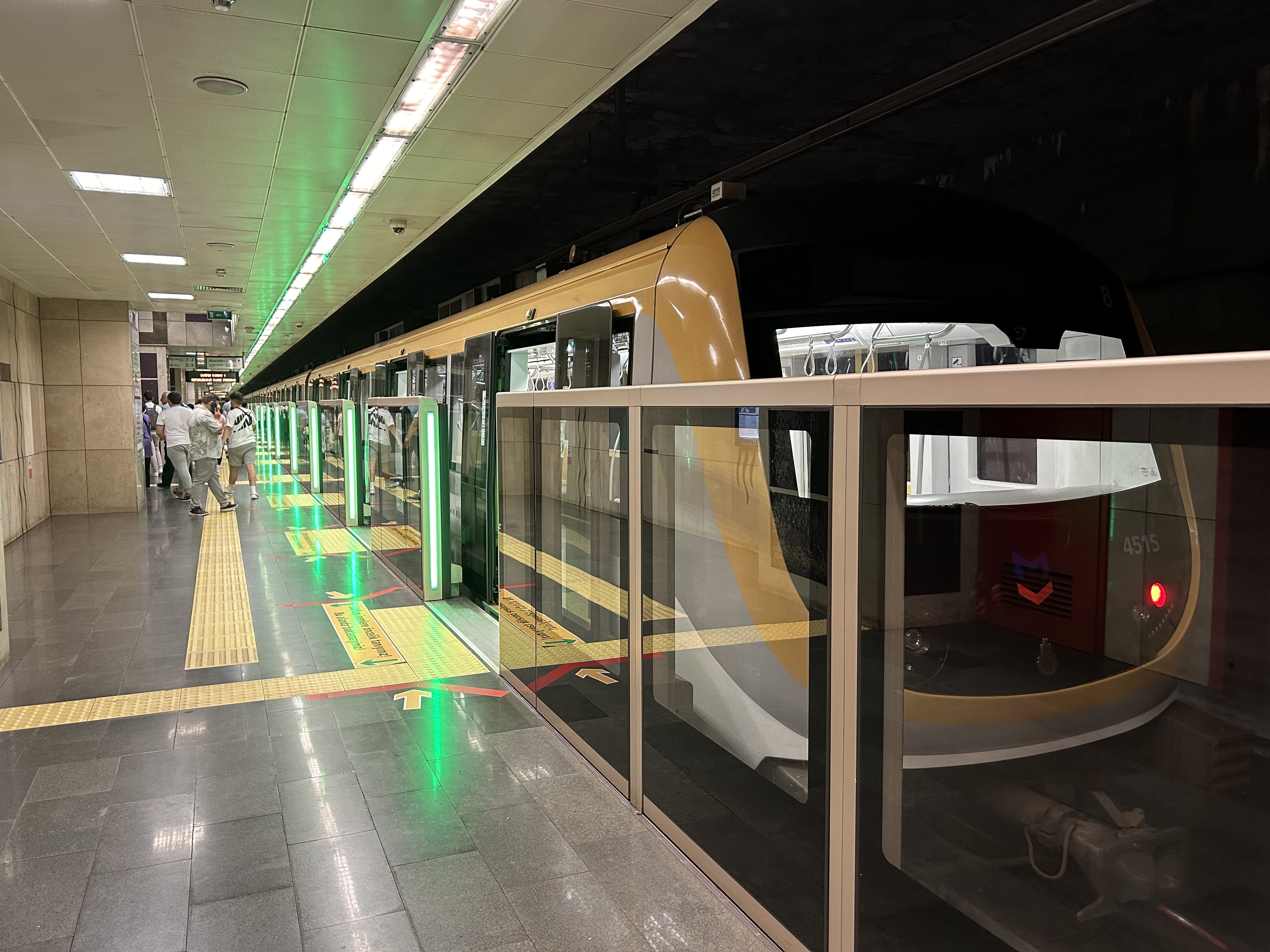
A CAF-Mitsubishi train set at Üsküdar station, 2024

Line M5, officially referred to as the M5 Üsküdar–Sultanbeyli line (Turkish: M5 Üsküdar–Sultanbeyli metro hattı), is a rapid transit line of the Istanbul Metro system. It is colored deep purple on the maps and route signs. The M5 is the second rapid transit line on the Asian side of Istanbul, the other in service since August 2012, the M4. Furthermore, it is the first driverless rapid transit line in Turkey.

== History ==
The contract for the construction of the line's first phase was awarded in October 2011 to the Doğuş Construction Group. Construction of the 20-kilometre-long (12 mi) line in the west–east direction with 16 stations between Üsküdar and Çekmeköy, and its connection line to the depot with a length of 3 km (1.9 mi), began on 20 March 2012. Projected to cost about €564 million, the line was expected to open in May 2015; however, the expected opening day was then revised to 20 September 2016, until it became clear that it would not open then. In June 2014, 21 six-car driverless trainsets, manufactured by a consortium of CAF and Mitsubishi, were ordered to operate on the line, the first of which was delivered on 21 November 2016. According to news in Turkish TV in November 2016, half of the M5 line (Üsküdar - Ümraniye) would open in January 2017, with driverless trains, and then in early 2017 the new opening date was stated to be 22 March providing there are no further delays. But in April 2017 the opening date had been postponed further to 30 August 2017. Later it was postponed further, first to 14 September 2017 and then to 29 October 2017. The first stage of the line, running from Üsküdar to Yamanevler, finally opened on 15 December 2017. The second stage, from Yamanevler to Çekmeköy, opened on 21 October 2018. The third stage of the line, and the first phase of the extension to Sultanbeyli, opened on 16 March 2024 from Çekmeköy to Samandıra Merkez (excluding Sancaktepe Şehir Hastanesi station). The fourth and final stage of the line, from Samandıra Merkez to Sultanbeyli, including Sancaktepe Şehir Hastanesi station, opened on 22 May 2026.

Earlier plans to extend the line to Sabiha Gökçen International Airport in the future have been cancelled, with the M4 extension now open to this airport.

=== Opening timeline ===
Stage	Segment	Commencement	Length	Station(s)
1	Üsküdar – Yamanevler	15 December 2017	9.9 km (6.15 mi)	9
2	Yamanevler – Çekmeköy	21 October 2018	10.1 km (6.28 mi)	7
3	Çekmeköy – Samandıra Merkez	16 March 2024	6.5 km (4.04 mi)	4
4	Sancaktepe Şehir Hastanesi	22 May 2026	–	1
4	Samandıra Merkez – Sultanbeyli	22 May 2026	4.4 km (2.73 mi)	3

== Stations ==
The M5 has a total of 24 stations. All stations have protective barriers with automatic doors, opening only when the train is stopped at the platform.

M5 route diagram

M5 Üsküdar-Sultanbeyli
Station	District	Opened	Connections
Üsküdar	Üsküdar	15 December 2017	TCDD Taşımacılık: Marmaray; Şehir Hatları; Turyol; Dentur; İETT Bus: 2, 5, 6, 9A, 11BE, 11C, 11D, 11E, 11ES, 11L, 11M, 11P, 11ST, 11T, 11Ü, 11ÜS, 11Y, 12, 12A, 12C, 13M, 15, 15B, 15C, 15E, 15H, 15K, 15KÇ, 15M, 15N, 15P, 15R, 15S, 15T, 15Y, 15ŞN, 15Z, 16A, 16F, 16M, 16, 18, 18Ü, 18Y, 139, 139A, 320A
Fıstıkağacı	Üsküdar	15 December 2017	İETT Bus: 2, 9, 9Ç, 9Ş, 9Ü, 9ÜD, 11A, 11BE, 11C, 11D, 11E, 11EK, 11ES, 11G, 11K, 11L, 11M, 11N, 11ST, 11T, 11Ü, 11Ü, 11ÜS, 11Y, 12A, 12ÜS, 139, 139A, 320, D1
Bağlarbaşı	Üsküdar	15 December 2017	İETT Bus: 2, 3, 9, 9A, 9Ç, 9Ş, 9Ü, 9ÜD, 11A, 11BE, 11C, 11D, 11E, 11EK, 11ES, 11G, 11K, 11L, 11M, 11N, 11P, 11ST, 11Ü, 11ÜS, 11Y, 12A, 12ÜS, 13, 13AB, 13B, 13TD, 14, 14D, 14F, 14K, 14M, 14R, 14Y, 14YK, 15F, 125, 129T, 139, 139A, 320, 500A, D1, MR9
Altunizade	Üsküdar	15 December 2017	Istanbul Metro: (under construction) Metrobus: 34G, 34AS, 34A, 34Z; İETT Bus: 9, 9A, 9Ç, 9Ş, 9T, 9Ü, 9ÜD, 11, 11A, 11BE, 11C, 11D, 11E, 11EK, 11G, 11K, 11L, 11M, 11N, 11P, 11SA, 11ST, 11ÜS, 11V, 11Y, 12ÜS, 13, 13B, 13TD, 14, 14D, 14F, 14FD, 14K, 14M, 14R, 14Y, 14YK, 15F, 125, 129T, 139, 139A, 320, D1, MR9
Kısıklı	Üsküdar	15 December 2017	İETT Bus: 9, 9A, 9Ç, 9Ş, 9T, 9Ü, 9ÜD, 11, 11A, 11D, 11E, 11EK, 11G, 11K, 11L, 11M, 11N, 11P, 11SA, 11ST, 11ÜS, 11V, 11Y, 12ÜS, 13, 13AB, 13B, 13TD, 14, 14D, 14F, 14FD, 14K, 14R, 14Y, 14YK, 129T, 320, 522, D1, MR9, TB2
Bulgurlu	Üsküdar	15 December 2017	İETT Bus: 6, 8E, 9K, 11E, 11EK, 11L, 11M, 11N, 14B, 14DK, 14E, 14ES, 15BK, 15ÇK, 15SK, 15YK
Ümraniye	Ümraniye	15 December 2017	İETT Bus: 9A, 9Ç, 9Ş, 9Ü, 9ÜD, 10, 11D, 11G, 11K, 11P, 11V, 13, 13B, 13H, 13TD, 14, 14B, 14DK, 14E, 14ES, 14K, 14YE, 19D, 20, 131, 131A, 131C, 131T, 131TD, 131Ü, 131YS, 138, 139, 139A, 320, 522, D1
Çarşı	Ümraniye	15 December 2017	Istanbul Metro: (under construction); İETT Bus: 9A, 9Ç, 9Ş, 9Ü, 9ÜD, 10, 11D, 11G, 11K, 11P, 11V, 13, 13B, 13H, 13TD, 14, 14B, 14DK, 14E, 14ES, 14K, 14YE, 19D, 20, 131, 131A, 131B, 131C, 131T, 131TD, 131YS, 131Ü, 138, 139, 139A, 320, 522
Yamanevler	Ümraniye	15 December 2017	İETT Bus: 9A, 9Ç, 9Ş, 9Ü, 9ÜD, 10, 11G, 11H, 11P, 11V, 11ÇB, 13, 13B, 13H, 13TD, 14, 14B, 14E, 14ES, 14YE, 19D, 131, 131A, 131B, 131C, 131TD, 131YS, 131Ü, 138, 320, 522
Çakmak	Ümraniye	21 October 2018	İETT Bus: 8K, 9Ç, 9Ş, 9Ü, 9ÜD, 10, 11H, 11P, 11V, 11ÇB, 13, 13H, 13TD, 14, 14B, 14ES, 14YE, 19D, 20Ü, 131, 131A, 131B, 131C, 131T, 131TD, 131YS, 131Ü, 138, 139, 139A, 320, 522
Ihlamurkuyu	Ümraniye	21 October 2018	İETT Bus: 8K, 9, 9Ç, 9Ş, 9Ü, 9ÜD, 11ÇB, 11G, 11H, 11P, 11V, 13TD, 14, 14B, 15SD, 19D, 20Ü, 14YE, 11ÇB, 122C, 131, 131A, 131B, 131C, 131H, 131TD, 131Ü, 139T, 320, 522, 522B, E-3
Altınşehir	Ümraniye	21 October 2018	İETT Bus: 9Ç, 9Ş, 9Ü, 9ÜD, 11ÇB, 11G, 11P, 11V, 14, 14YE, 15SD, 19D, 131A, 131B, 131C, 131H, 131TD, 131Ü, 320, 522, 522B
İmam Hatip Lisesi	Ümraniye	21 October 2018	İETT Bus: 11V, 11ÇB, 11ÜS, 14, 14TM, 15SD, 19D, 131, 131A, 131B, 131C, 131H, 131TD, 131Ü, 522, 522B
Dudullu	Ümraniye	21 October 2018	Istanbul Metro: İETT Bus: 11V, 11ÇB, 11ÜS, 14, 14TM, 15SD, 19D, 131, 131A, 131B, 131C, 131H, 131TD, 131Ü, 522, 522B
Necip Fazıl	Ümraniye	21 October 2018	İETT Bus: 11V, 14, 14A, 14AK, 14CE, 14T, 19S, 19SB, 131, 131A, 131B, 131H, 131T, 131TD, 131Ü, 522, 522B, ÇM41
Çekmeköy	Çekmeköy	21 October 2018	İETT Bus: 9ÇN, 9H, 9K, 11, 11A, 11G, 11R, 11SA, 11ÜS, 11V, 14, 14A, 14AK, 14T, 14YK, 19S, 19SB, 122V, 131, 131A, 131B, 131C, 131H, 131T, 131TD, 131Ü, 131Y, 132YM, 138, 138B, 139, 139A, 139D, 139S, 139T, 522N, 522ST, ÇM42, MR9
Meclis	Sancaktepe	16 March 2024	İETT Bus: 14S, 19A, 19E, 19EK, 19V, 20D, 131K, 131YS, ÇM42, ÇM43, ÇM44
Sarıgazi	Sancaktepe	16 March 2024	İETT Bus: 11,11SA, 11V, 11ÜS, 14, 14YK, 19A, 19EK,Ü 19S, 19SB, 122H, 122V, 131, 131A, 131B, 131C, 131H, 131K,131Y, 131Ü, 132YM, 522B, 522ST, 622, UM60, UM61, UM73
Sancaktepe Şehir Hastanesi	Sancaktepe	22 May 2026	İETT Bus: 11ÜS, 14S, 19SB, 19V, 122H, 122V, 131, 131A, 131C, 131H, 131Ü, 132S, 132YB, 132ÇK, 522ST, UM73, ÇM44
Sancaktepe	Sancaktepe	16 March 2024	İETT Bus: 11SA, 18E, 131B, 131Y, 132YM, UM60
Samandıra Merkez	Sancaktepe	16 March 2024	İETT Bus: 11SA, 11ÜS, 14KS, 14S, 18E, 18F, 18UK, 18V,18Y, 18Ü, 19SB, 122H, 131, 131A, 131B, 131C, 131H, 131V, 131Y 131Ü, 132M, 132N, 132S, 132SB, 132YB, 132YM, 132ÇK, 320A, 522ST, KM70, UM60, UM73
Veysel Karani	Sancaktepe	22 May 2026	İETT Bus: 132C
Hasanpaşa	Sultanbeyli	22 May 2026	İETT Bus: 11ÜS, 122H, 131SB, 132C, 132M, 132P, 132SB, 132Z, 14KS, 14S, 18A, 18D, 18K, 18M, 18Ü, 18UK, 18YS, 522ST, SM1, SM4, SM6, UM73
Sultanbeyli	Sultanbeyli	22 May 2026	İETT Bus: 11ÜS, 122H, 131SB, 132C, 132P, 132YS, 14KS, 14S, 18A, 18D, 18K, 18Ü, 18UK, 522ST, KM72, SM1, SM4, UM73

== See also ==
- Public transport in Istanbul
- Istanbul Metro
- Istanbul modern tramways
- Istanbul nostalgic tramways
- Marmaray
