= Üsküdar metro station =

Station of the Istanbul Metro

Üsküdar
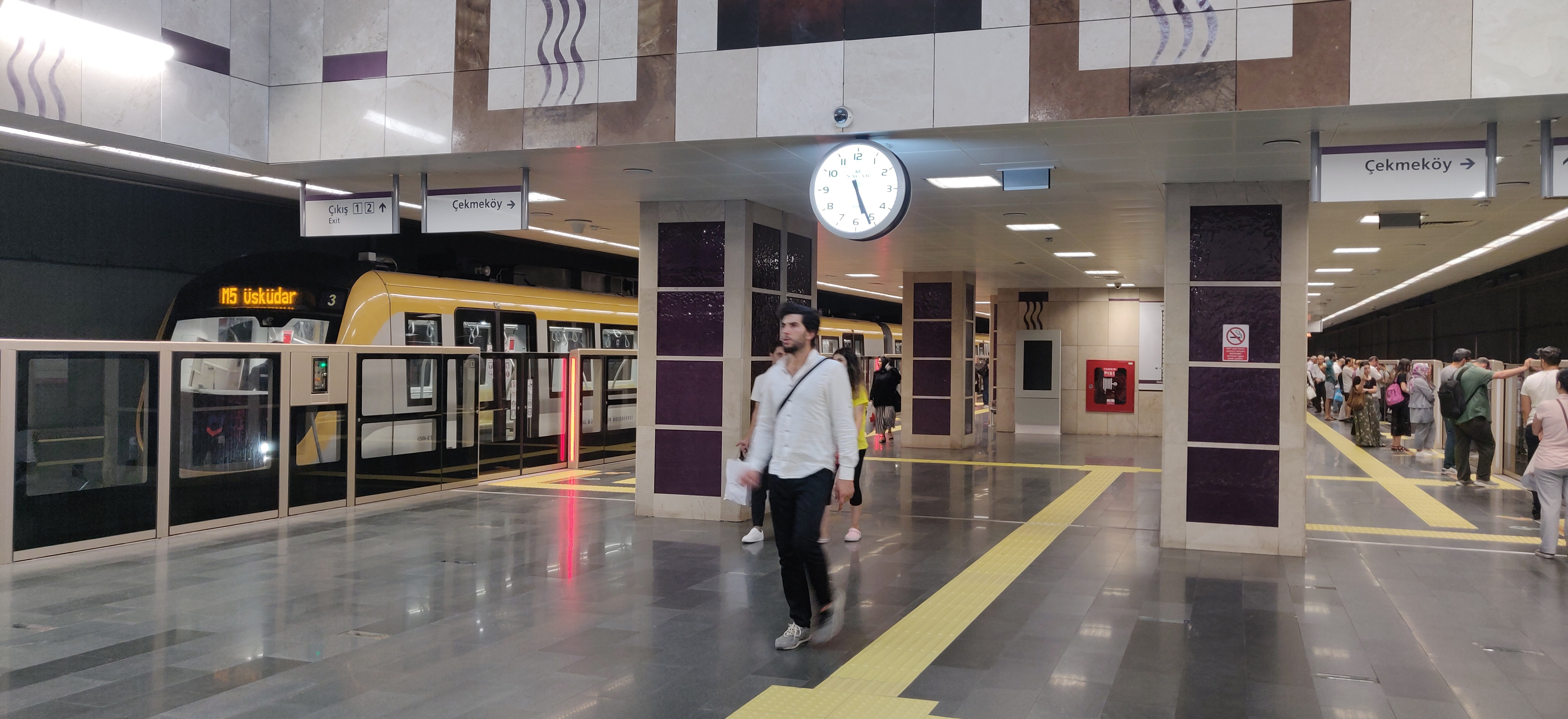

General information
- Location: Üsküdar Meydanı, Mimar Sinan Mah., 34672; Üsküdar, Istanbul
- Coordinates: 41.0253°N 29.0133°E
- System: Istanbul Metro rapid transit station
- Owner: Istanbul Metropolitan Municipality
- Operator: Istanbul Metro
- Line: M5
- Platforms: 1 island platform
- Tracks: 2
- Connections: TCDD Taşımacılık: Marmaray at Üsküdar; Şehir Hatları at Üsküdar Terminal; Turyol at Üsküdar Pier; Dentur at Üsküdar Terminal; İETT Bus: 15, 15B, 15C, 15E, 15H, 15K, 15KÇ, 15M, 15N, 15P, 15R, 15S, 15T, 15Y, 15ŞN, 15Z; Istanbul Minibus: Üsküdar-Acıbadem

Construction
- Structure type: Underground
- Accessible: Yes

History
- Opened: 15 December 2017 (8 years ago)
- Electrified: 1,500 V DC Overhead line

Services
Preceding station	Istanbul Metro	Following station
Terminus	M5 Line	Fıstıkağacı towards Sultanbeyli
Location

Üsküdar is an underground station and the western terminus of the M5 line of the Istanbul Metro in Üsküdar. It is located beneath Üsküdar Square, near the Bosporus in the Mimar Sinan neighborhood. Connection to trans-Bosporus Marmaray commuter rail service is available from Üsküdar station as well as IETT city buses and municipal ferries from Üsküdar pier.

The station consists of an island platform with two tracks. Since the M5 is an ATO line, protective gates on each side of the platform open only when a train is in the station. Üsküdar station was opened on 15 December 2017, together with eight other stations to Yamanevler.

== Station layout ==
P Platform level	Westbound	← termination platform
P Platform level	Island platform, doors will open on the left
P Platform level	Eastbound	toward Sultanbeyli (Fıstıkağacı) →
