= Metro Istanbul =

Istanbul's rail operator

Metro İstanbul

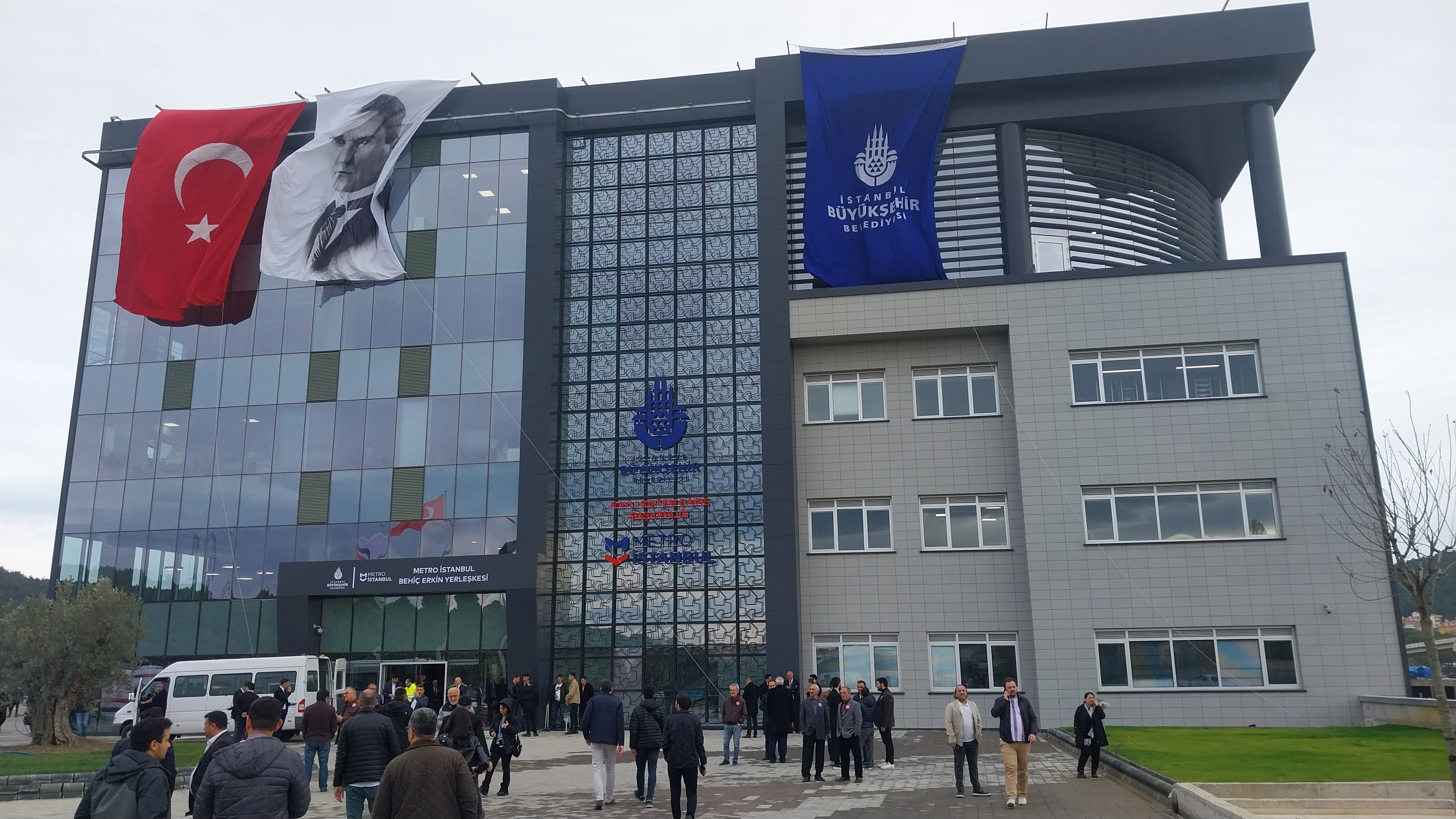
- Behiç Erkin Complex in Ümraniye
- Type: Anonim Şirket
- Industry: Public transport
- Founded: 1988; 38 years ago
- Headquarters: Esenler, Istanbul, Turkey
- Area served: Istanbul province
- Key people: Özgür Soy (CEO)
- Revenue: $255 million (2023)
- Owner: Istanbul Metropolitan Municipality
- Website: metro.istanbul

Metro İstanbul is a public rail transport operator headquartered in Istanbul, Turkey.

Established in 1988, the company is responsible for operating most of Istanbul's rail systems, including the Istanbul Metro, Istanbul Tram, funiculars and aerial tramways.

== History ==
The company was founded under the name of İstanbul Ulaşım A.Ş. on 16 August 1988, while Istanbul's first modern public urban rail line was under construction (Aksaray-Kocatepe section of the M1 line). Almost 28 years later, on 20 May 2016, the company was renamed as Metro İstanbul.

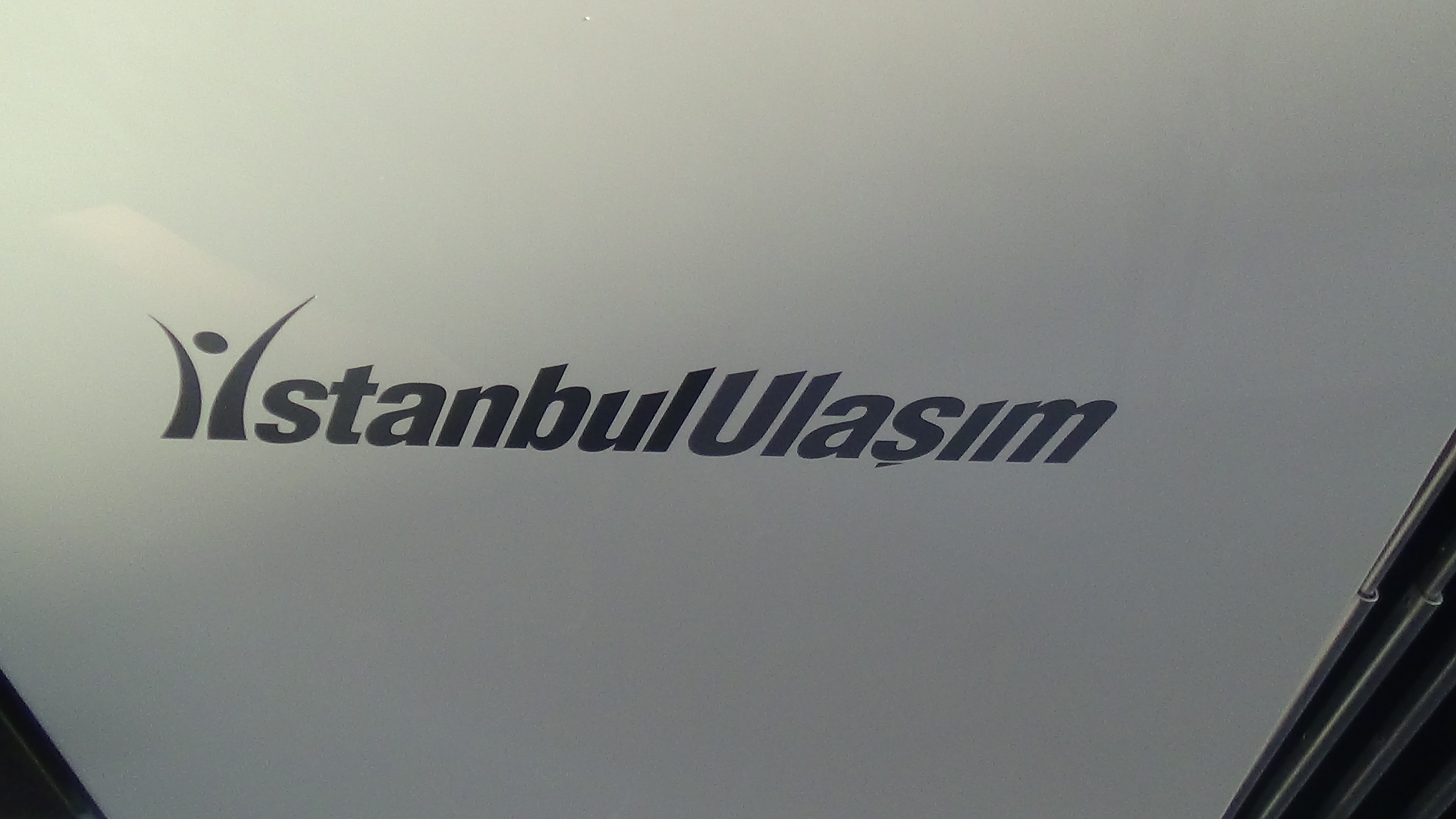
Old logo of the company

== Lines in operation ==
Metro lines:

- Yenikapı - Atatürk Airport
- Yenikapı - Halkalı-Üniversite
- Yenikapı - Hacıosman
- Sanayi Mahallesi - Seyrantepe
- Bakırköy Sahil - Kayaşehir Merkez
- Kadıköy - Sabiha Gökçen Airport - İçmeler
- Üsküdar - Sultanbeyli
- Levent - Boğaziçi Üniversitesi/Hisarüstü
- Kabataş - Hastane
- Bostancı - Parseller
- Ataköy - Olimpiyat
- M10 (Istanbul Metro)|Pendik Merkez - Sabiha Gökçen Airport
- M12 (Istanbul Metro) 60. Yıl Parkı - Kazım Karabekir
- M13 (Istanbul Metro) Emek - Yenidoğan

Tram lines:

- Kabataş - Bağcılar
- Kadıköy - Moda (Ring) Heritage Tramway
- Topkapı - Arnavutköy
- Eminönü - Alibeyköy Cep Otogarı
- Bayrampaşa Meydan - Eminönü

Funicular lines:

- Taksim - Kabataş
- Boğaziçi Üni./Hisarüstü–Aşiyan

Gondola lines:

- Maçka - Taşkışla
- Eyüp - Piyer Loti
