= Haznedar station =

Station of the Istanbul Metro

Haznedar
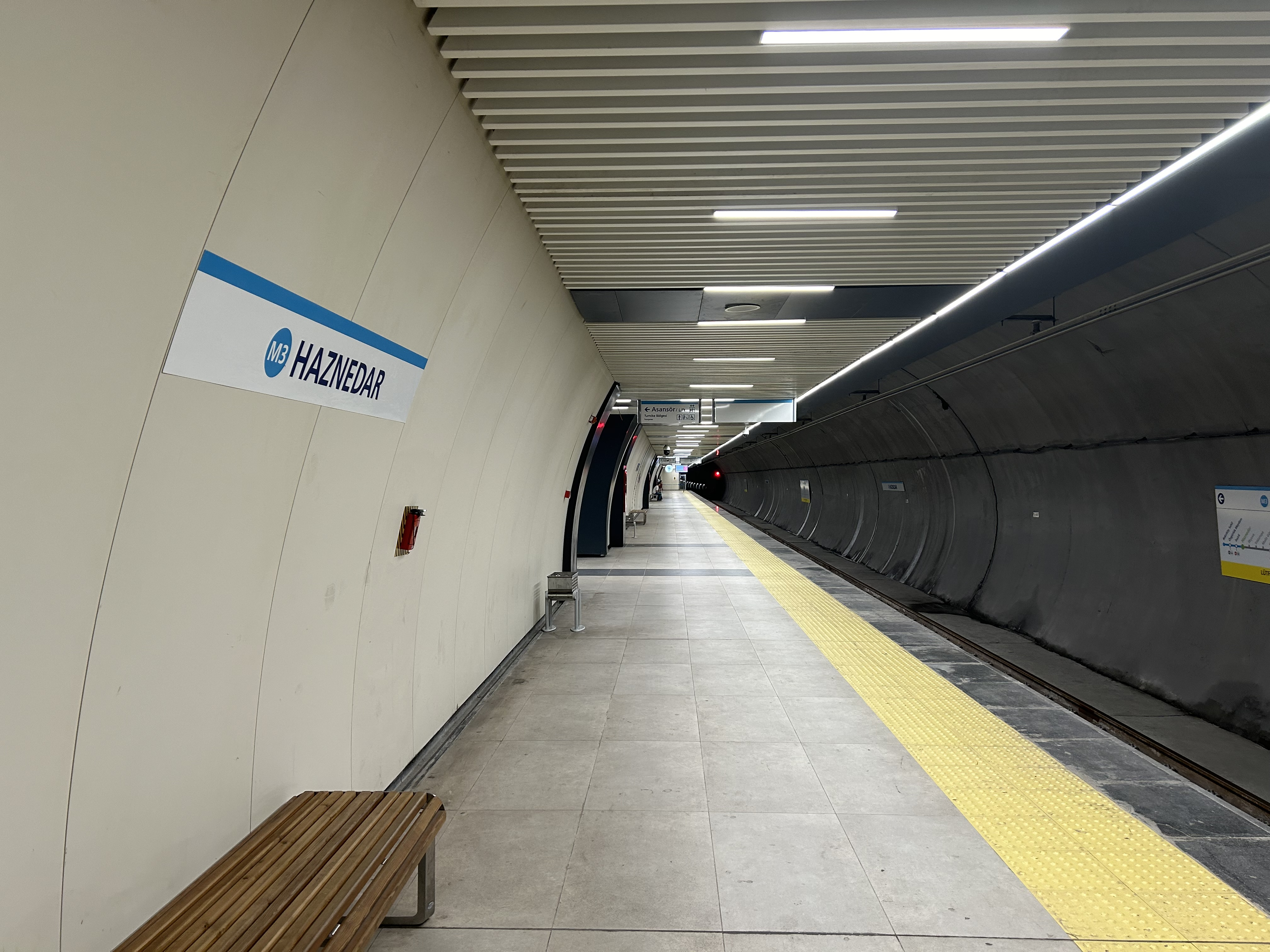
- Platform

General information
- Location: Bahçelievler Neighborhood, İzzettin Çalışlar Street, 34180; Bahçelievler, Istanbul; Turkey
- Coordinates: 41°0′17″N 28°52′18″E
- System: Istanbul Metro rapid transit station
- Owner: Istanbul Metropolitan Municipality
- Line: M3
- Platforms: 1 Island platform
- Tracks: 2
- Connections: İETT Bus: 36CY, 92, 97T, 98D, 98G, 98Y, MK97; Istanbul Minibus: Kocasinan Mahallesi – Bakırköy, Bakırköy – Kemalpaşa, Şirinevler – Bakırköy, Atışalanı – Bakırköy, Bakırköy – Otogar, Evren Mahallesi – Bakırköy, Bakırköy – Soğanlı, Bakırköy – Yenibosna Metro, Bakırköy – Yenimahalle Metro, Bakırköy Metro – Barbaros Mahallesi, Bakırköy Metro – İstoç

Construction
- Structure type: Underground
- Parking: No
- Cycle facilities: Yes
- Accessible: Yes

History
- Opened: 10 March 2024 (2 years ago)
- Electrified: 1,500 V DC Overhead line

Services
| Preceding station | Istanbul Metro | Following station |
|---|---|---|
| İlkyuva towards Kayaşehir Merkez | M3 Line | İncirli towards Bakırköy Sahil |
Location

Haznedar is an underground station on the M3 line of the Istanbul Metro. It is located under İzzettin Çalışlar Street in the Bahçelievler neighborhood of Bahçelievler. It was opened on 10 March 2024, with the opening of the M3 extension from Kirazlı to Bakırköy Sahil.

== Layout ==
| Northbound | ← toward Kayaşehir Merkez (İlkyuva) |
Island platform, doors will open on the left
| Southbound | toward Bakırköy Sahil (İncirli) → |

== Operation information ==
The line operates between 06:00 and 00:00 and train frequency is 7 minutes at peak hours and 10 minutes at all other times. The line has no night service.

== Gallery ==
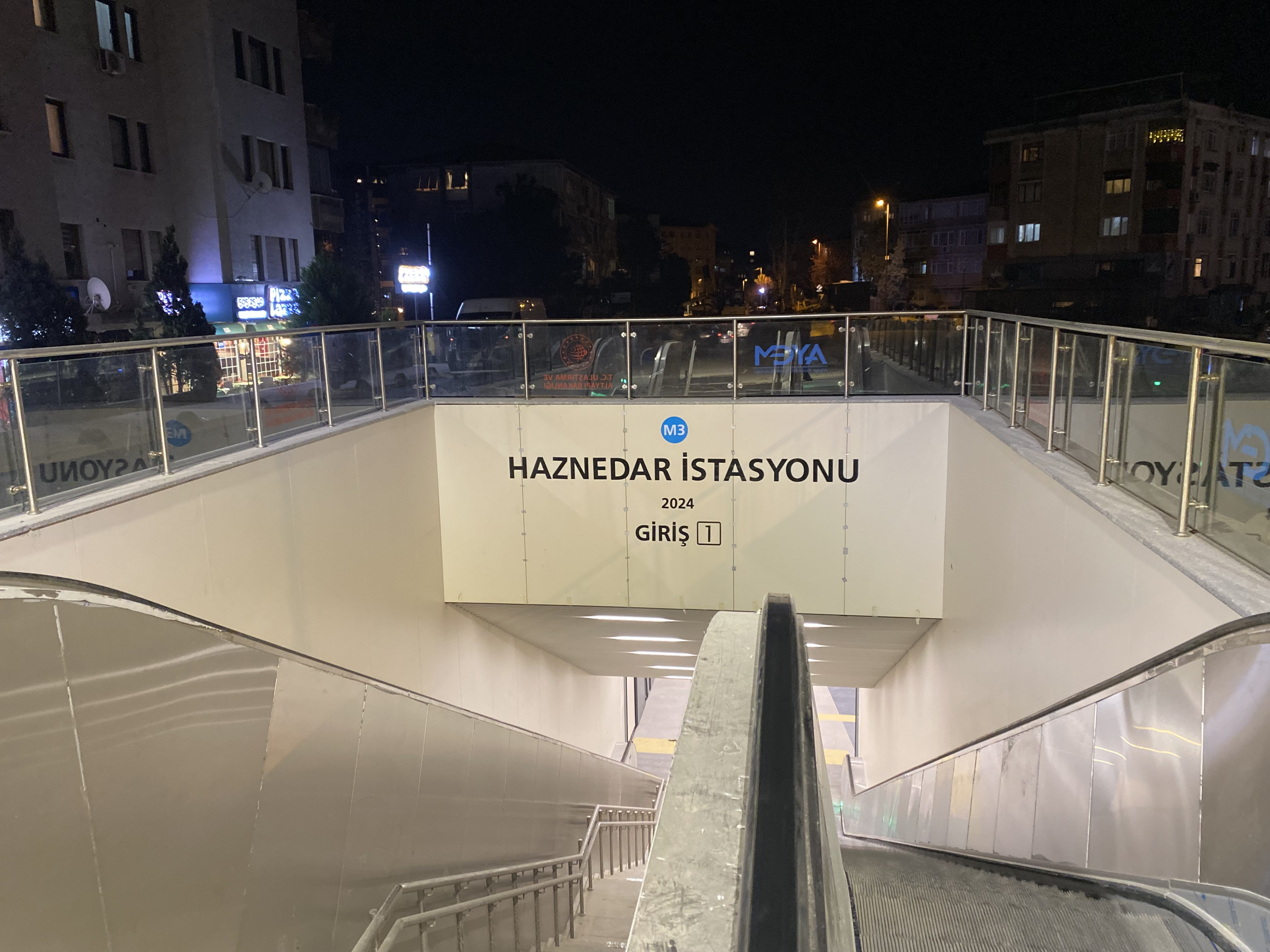
Entrance 1

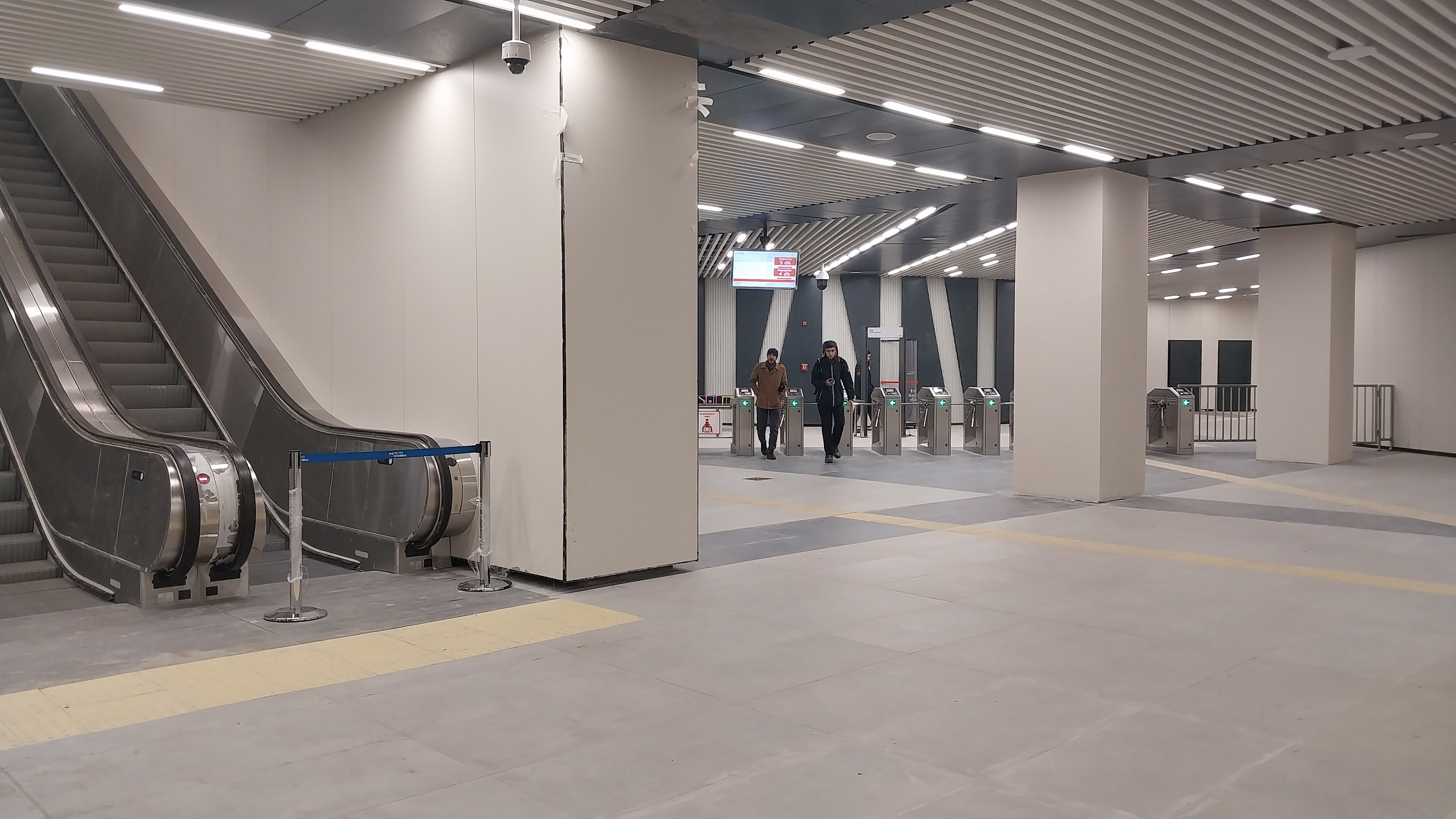
Ticket hall

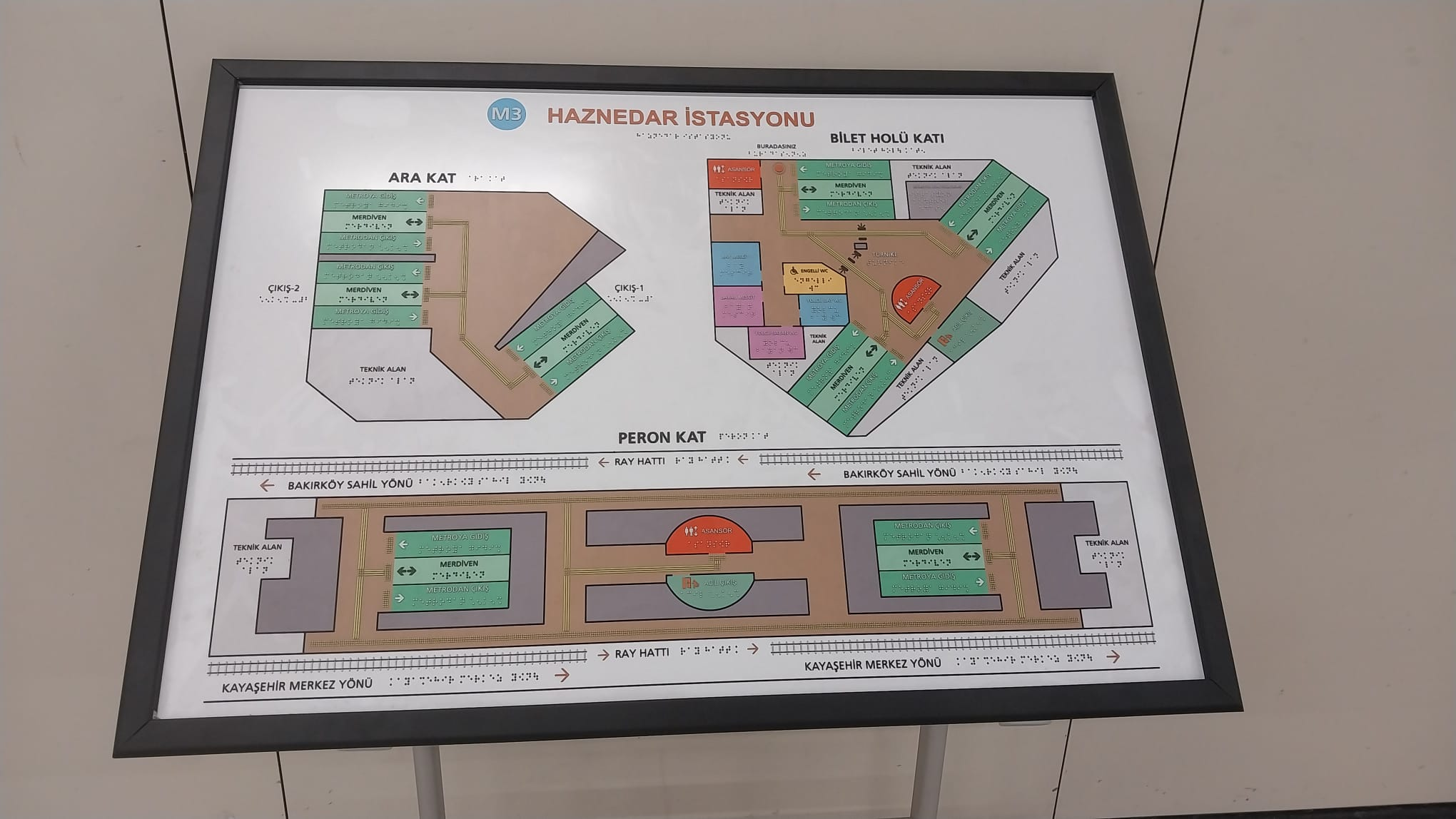
Station diagram

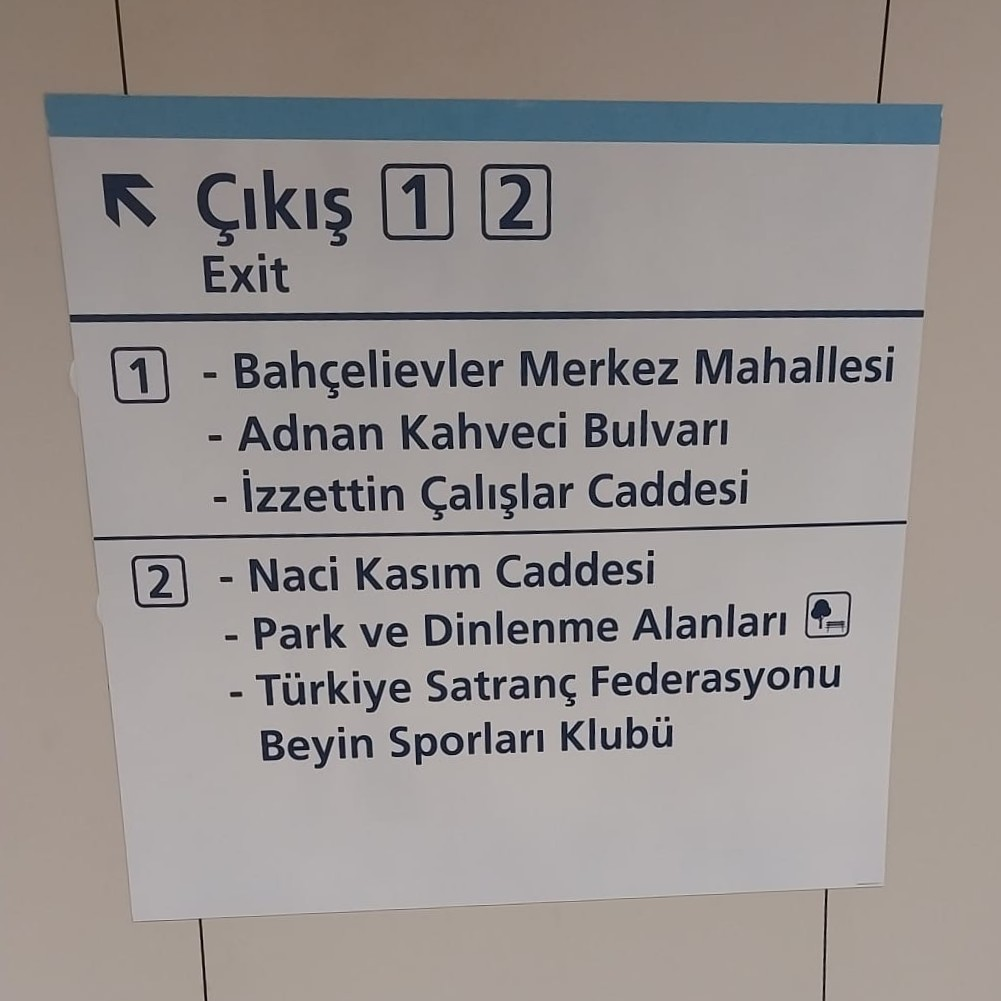
Exit list

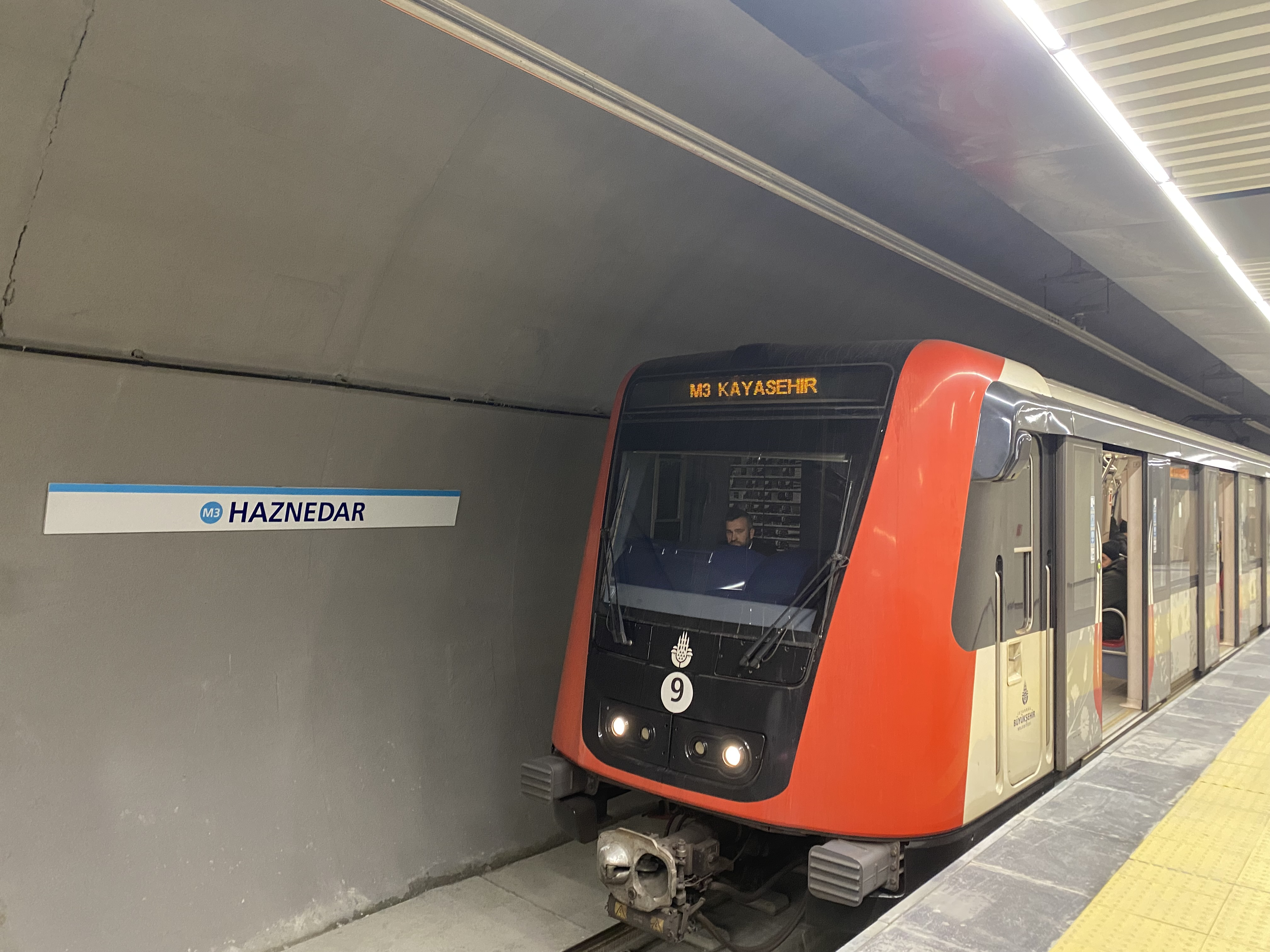
Train at the platform

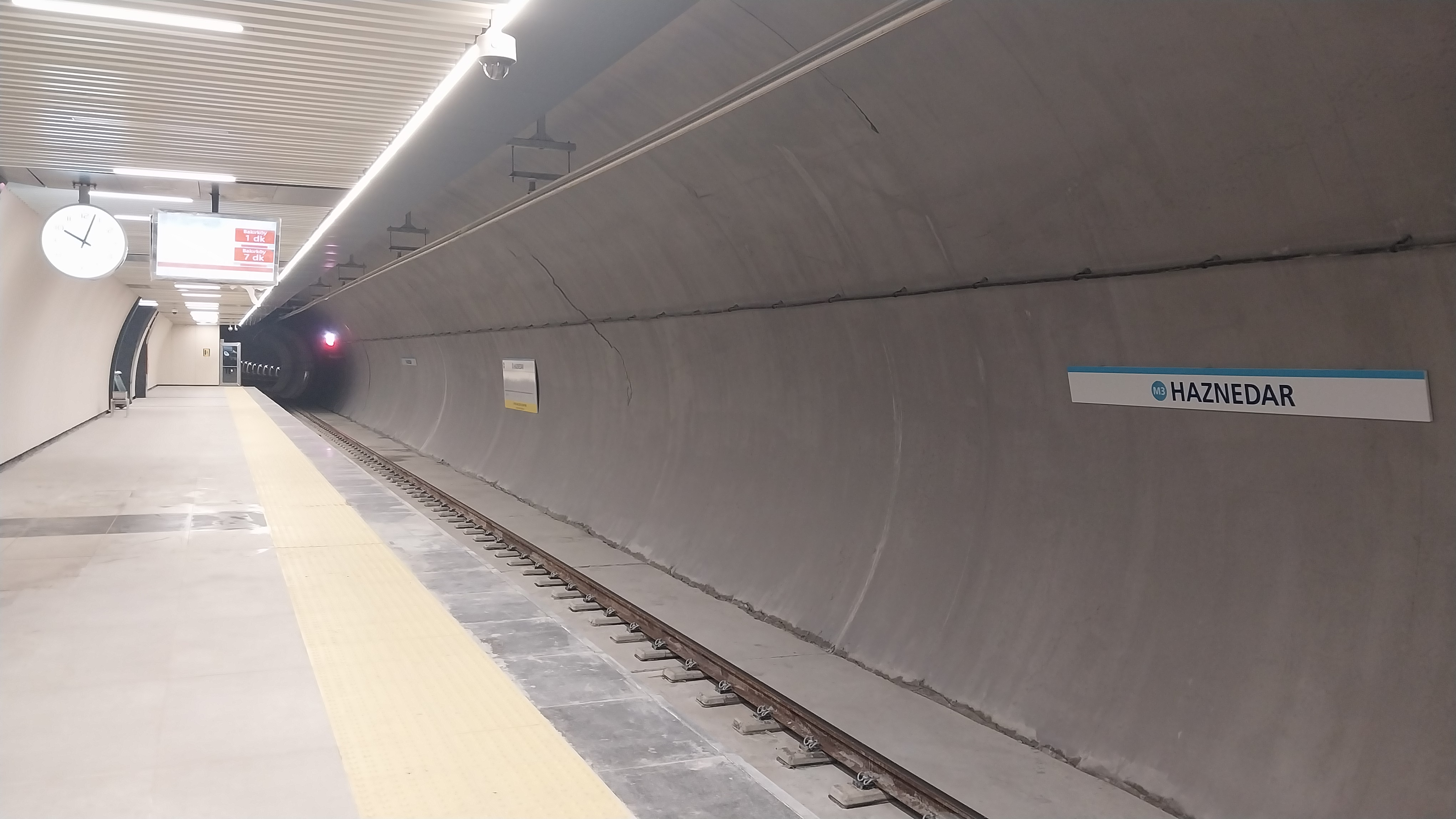
Platform
