= İlkyuva station =

Station of the Istanbul Metro

İlkyuva
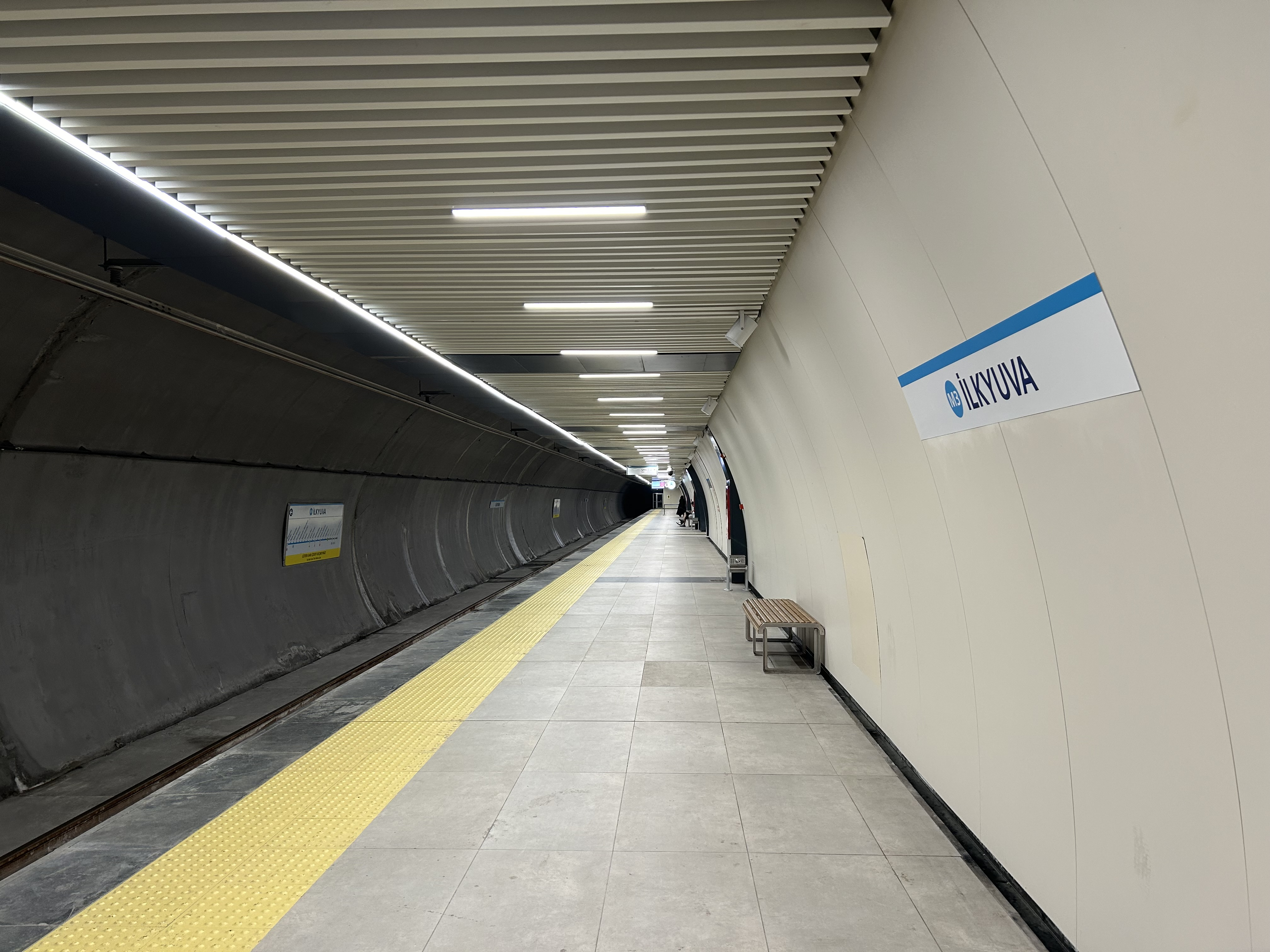
- Platform

General information
- Location: Bahçelievler Neighborhood, Bağcılar Street, 34180; Bahçelievler, Istanbul; Turkey
- Coordinates: 41°0′44″N 28°51′54″E
- System: Istanbul Metro rapid transit station
- Owner: Istanbul Metropolitan Municipality
- Line: M3
- Platforms: 1 Island platform
- Tracks: 2
- Connections: İETT Bus: 36CY, 92, 98D, 98Y; Istanbul Minibus: Kocasinan Mahallesi – Bakırköy, Bakırköy – Kemalpaşa, Evren Mahallesi – Bakırköy, Bakırköy – Yenibosna Metro, Bakırköy – Yenimahalle Metro, Bakırköy Metro – Barbaros Mahallesi, Bakırköy Metro – İstoç

Construction
- Structure type: Underground
- Parking: No
- Cycle facilities: Yes
- Accessible: Yes

History
- Opened: 10 March 2024 (2 years ago)
- Electrified: 1,500 V DC Overhead line

Services
Preceding station	Istanbul Metro	Following station
Yıldıztepe towards Kayaşehir Merkez	M3 Line	Haznedar towards Bakırköy Sahil
Location

İlkyuva is an underground station on the M3 line of the Istanbul Metro. It is located under Bağcılar Street in the Bahçelievler neighborhood of Bahçelievler. It was opened on 10 March 2024, with the opening of the M3 extension from Kirazlı to Bakırköy Sahil.

== Layout ==
Northbound	← toward Kayaşehir Merkez (Yıldıztepe)
Island platform, doors will open on the left
Southbound	toward Bakırköy Sahil (Haznedar) →

== Operation information ==
The line operates between 06:00 and 00:00 and train frequency is 7 minutes at peak hours and 10 minutes at all other times. The line has no night service.

== Gallery ==
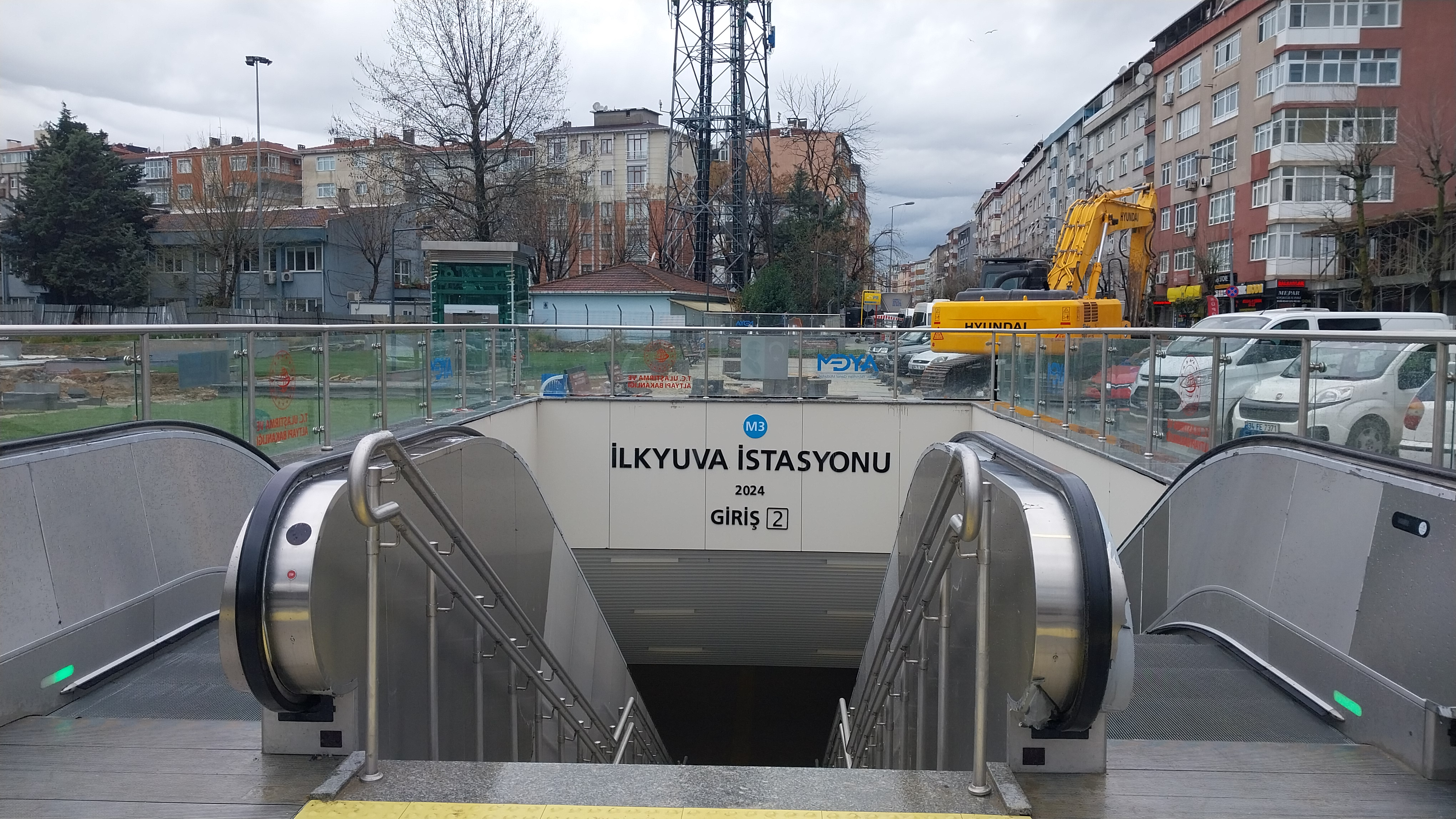
Entrance 2

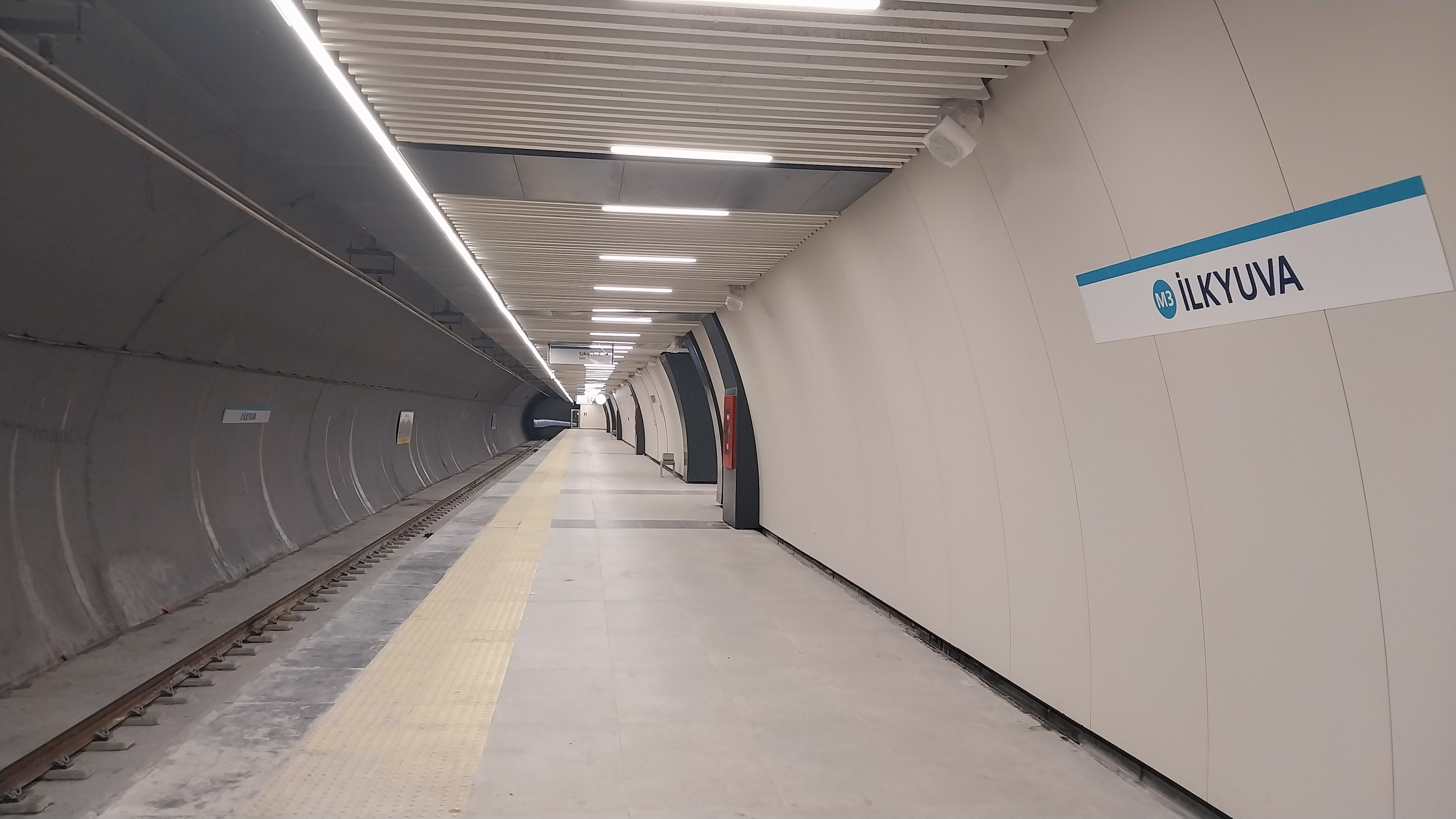
Platform
