= Yıldıztepe station =

Station of the Istanbul Metro

Yıldıztepe
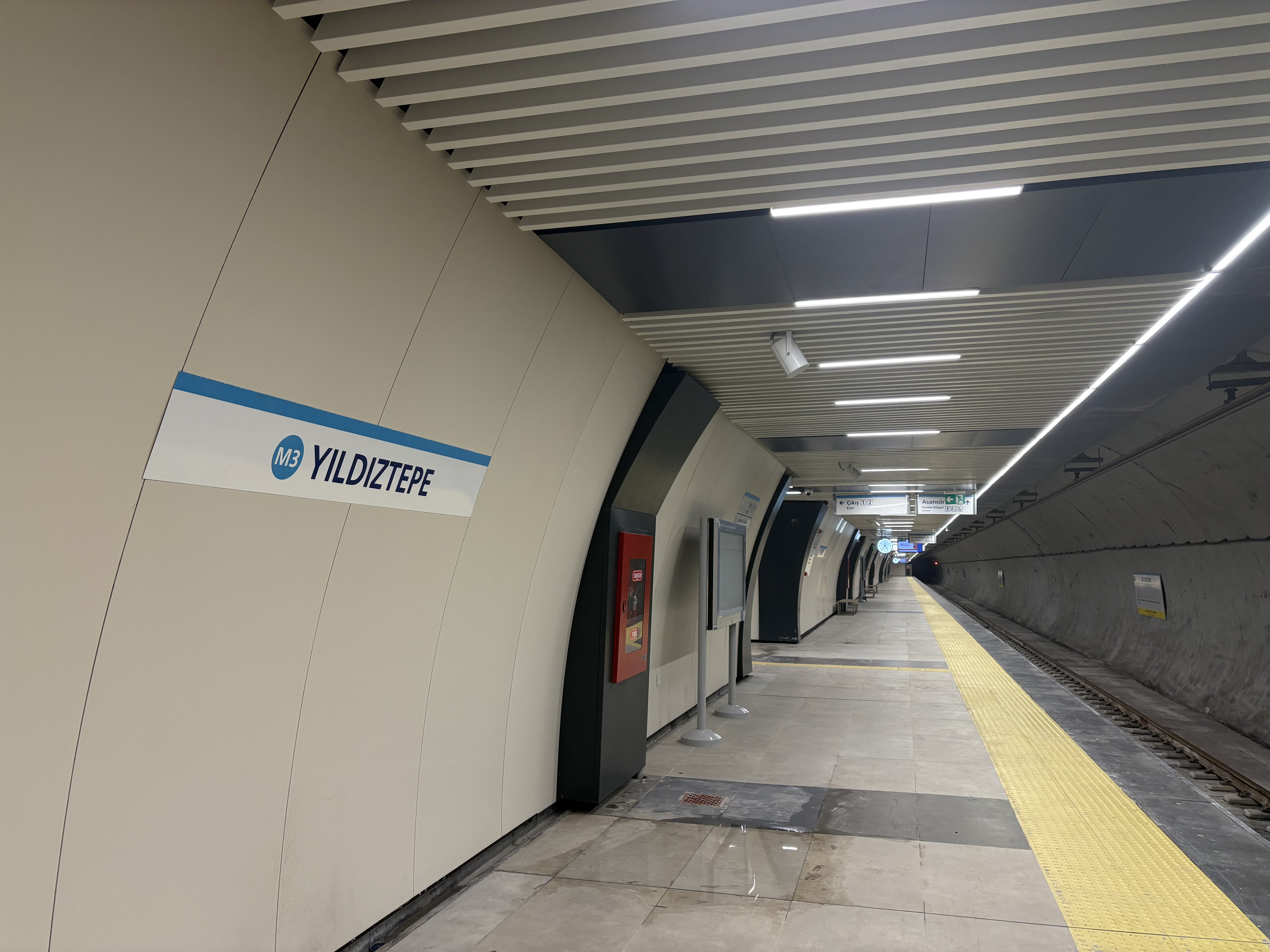
- Platform

General information
- Location: Yıldıztepe Neighborhood, Kıbrıs Street, 34203; Bağcılar, Istanbul; Turkey
- Coordinates: 41°1′10″N 28°51′28″E
- System: Istanbul Metro rapid transit station
- Owner: Istanbul Metropolitan Municipality
- Line: M3
- Platforms: 1 Island platform
- Tracks: 2

Construction
- Structure type: Underground
- Parking: No
- Cycle facilities: Yes
- Accessible: Yes

History
- Opening: 8 October 2025 (10 months ago)
- Electrified: 1,500 V DC Overhead line

Services
| Preceding station | Istanbul Metro | Following station |
|---|---|---|
| Molla Gürani towards Kayaşehir Merkez | M3 Line | İlkyuva towards Bakırköy Sahil |
Location

Yıldıztepe is an underground station on the M3 line of the Istanbul Metro. It is located under Mehmet Akif Boulevard in the İnönü neighborhood of Bağcılar. Due to difficulties in station construction, the station could not be opened with the rest of the M3 extension from Kirazlı to Bakırköy Sahil. The station was opened on 8 October 2025.

== Layout ==
| Northbound | ← toward Kayaşehir Merkez (Molla Gürani) |
Island platform, doors will open on the left
| Southbound | toward Bakırköy Sahil (İlkyuva) → |

== Operation information ==
The line operates between 06:00 and 00:00 and train frequency is 7 minutes at peak hours and 10 minutes at all other times. The line has no night service.

== Gallery ==
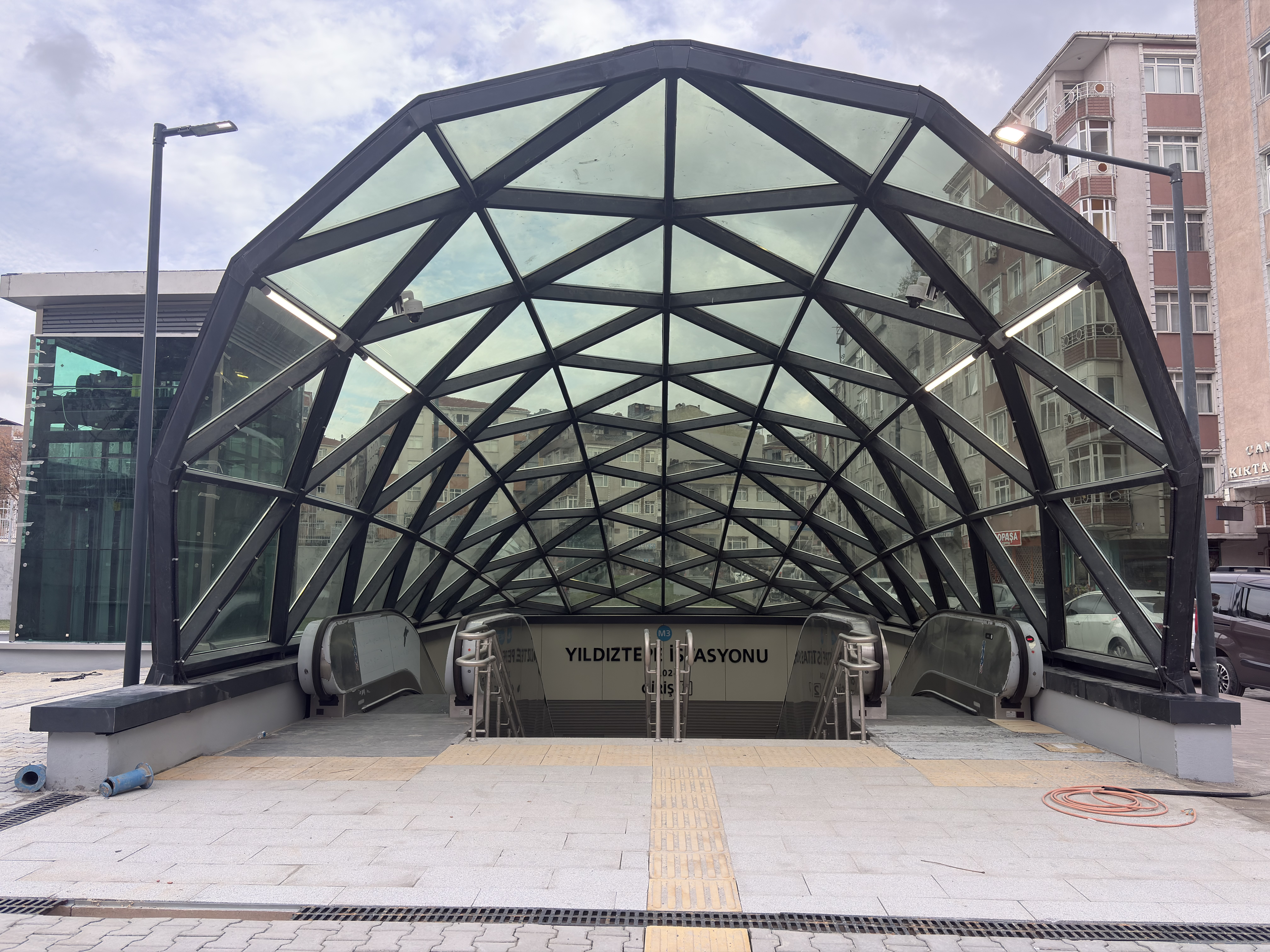
Entrance 2

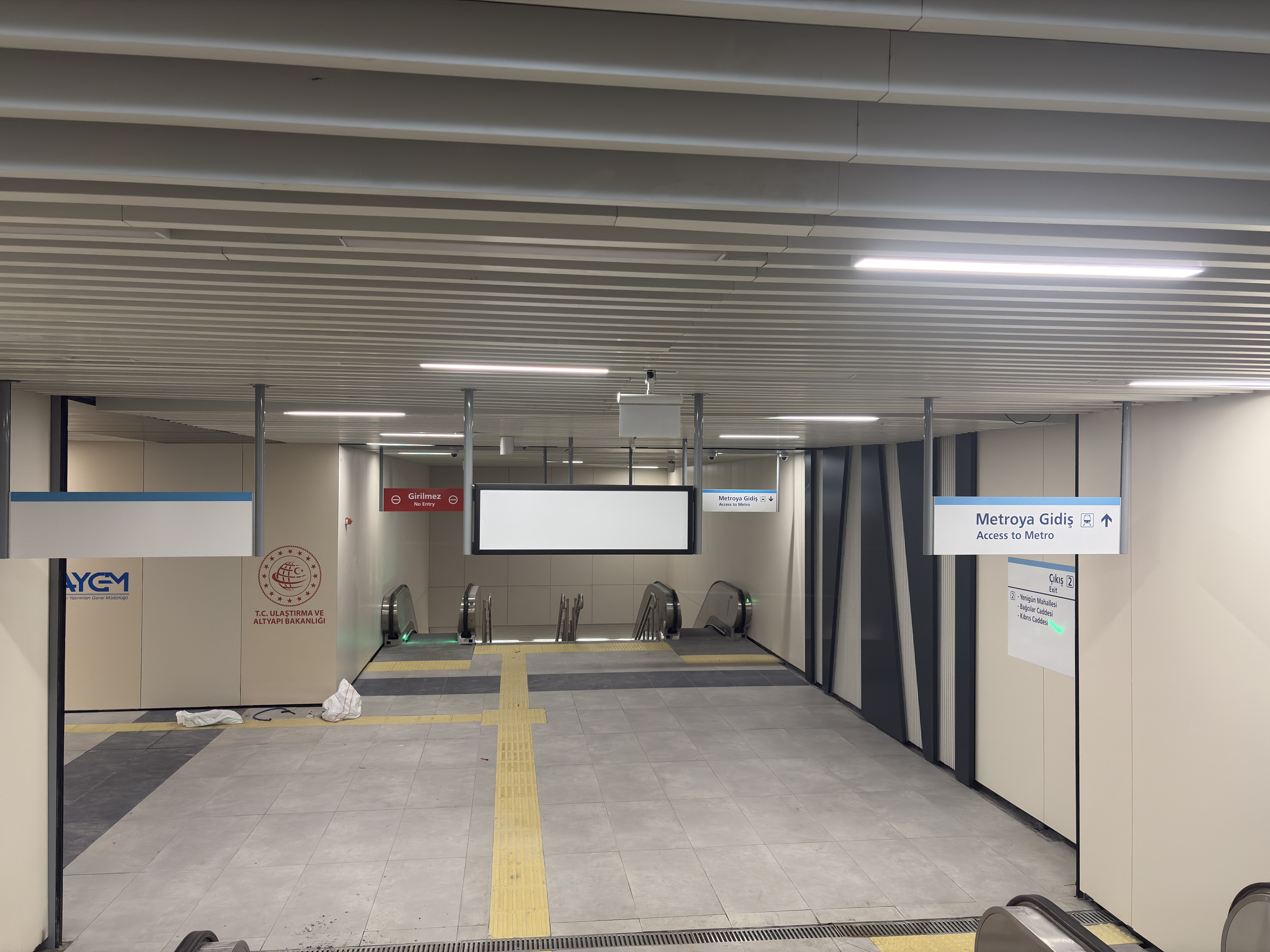
Mezzanine

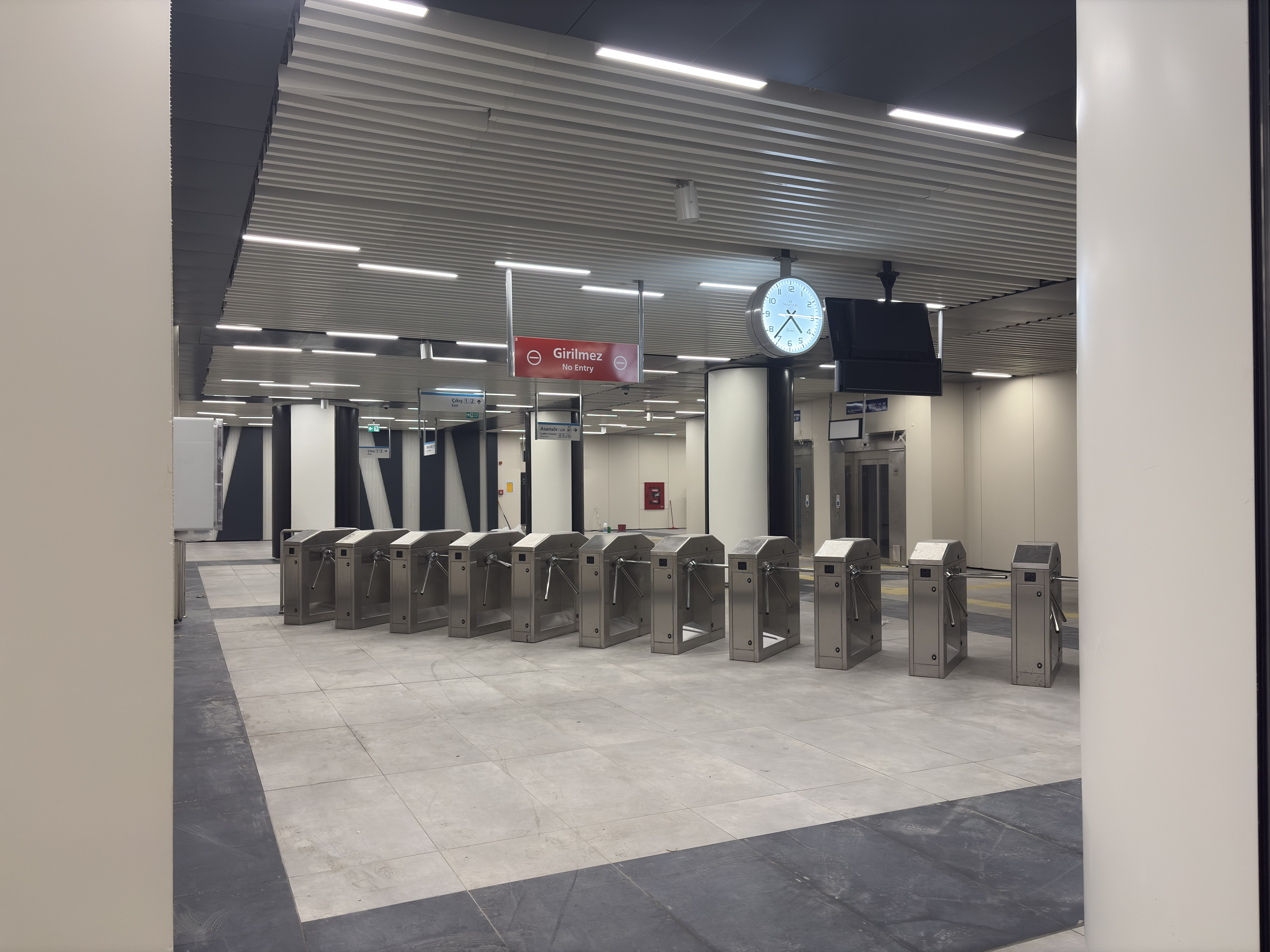
Turnstiles

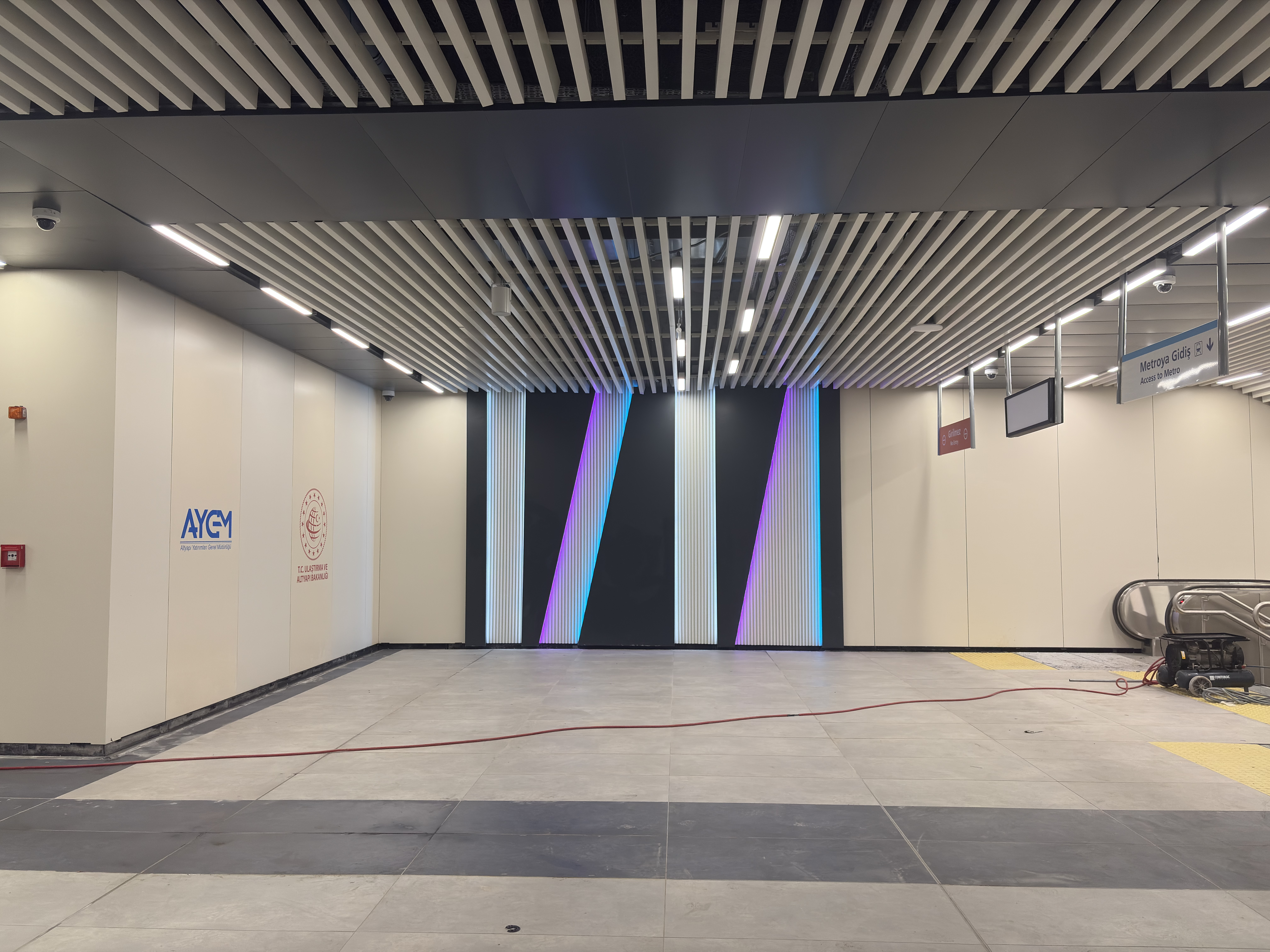
Lighting

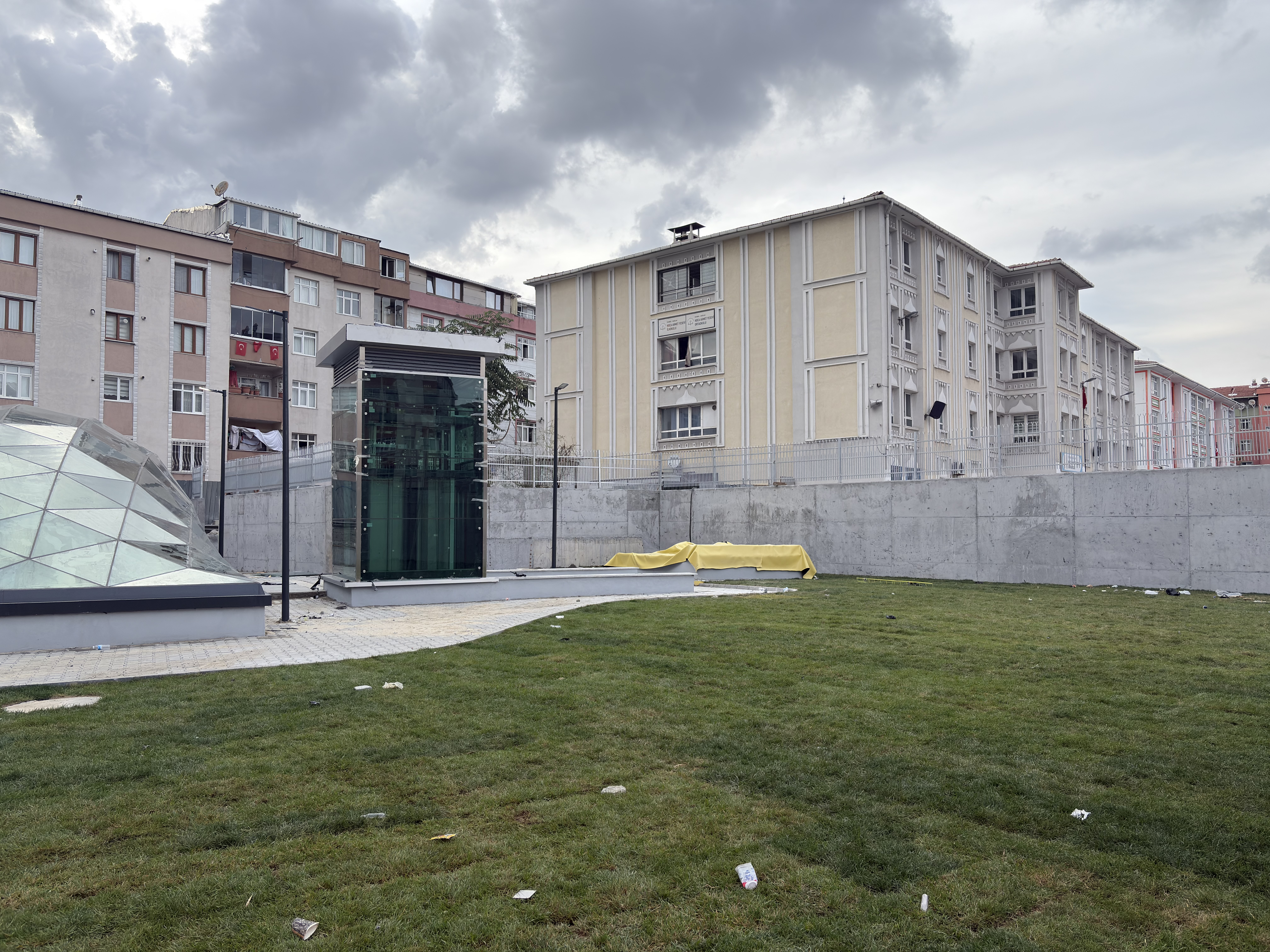
Surroundings
