= Municipal Council of Istanbul =

Decision-making organ of the Istanbul Metropolitan Municipality

Municipal Council of Istanbul "İstanbul Büyükşehir Belediye Meclisi"
- Unicameral deliberative assembly of Istanbul Metropolitan Municipality
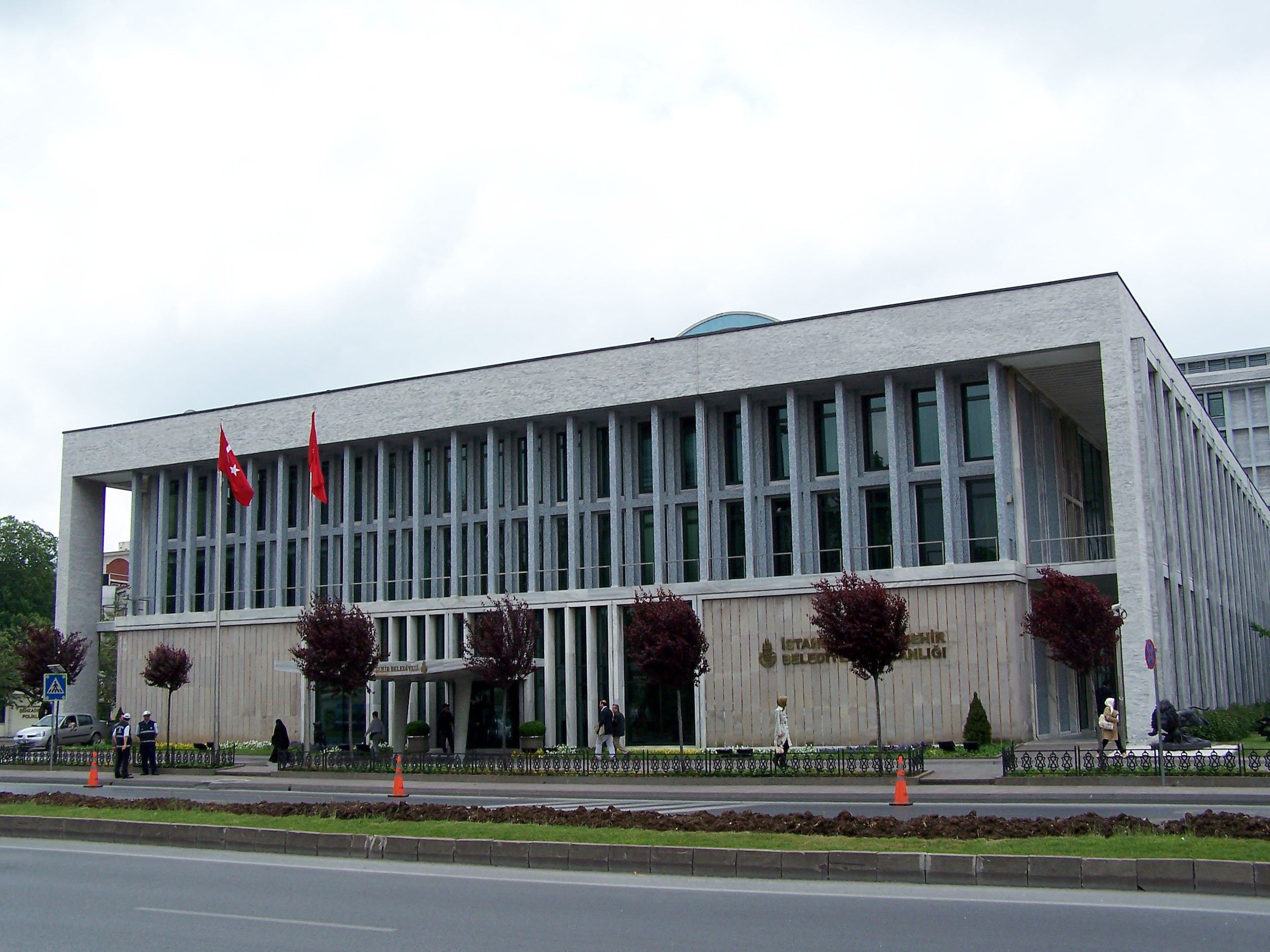
- Istanbul Municipal Palace, Fatih

History
- Founded: 6 November 1930

Leadership
- President: Nuri Aslan (CHP) since 26 March 2025)
- 1st Deputy Chairman: Vacant since 26 March 2025
- 2nd Deputy Chairman: Gökhan Gümüşdağ (CHP)
- Floor Leaders: Ülkü Sakalar (CHP)
- Zeynel Abidin Okul (AK Party)
- Orkun Ayhan (MHP)
- Dursun Çağlayan (BBP)

Structure
- Seats: 314
- Political groups: Mayoral majority (185): CHP (185); Opposition (129): AK Party (120); MHP (7); BBP (2)
- Length of term: 5 years

Elections
- Last election: 31 March 2024

The Municipal Council of Istanbul (Turkish: İstanbul Büyükşehir Belediye Meclisi) is the decision-making organ of the Istanbul Metropolitan Municipality. The council has decision making authority on most municipal matters with the exception of transport policy, which is handled by the Transport Coordination Center (Turkish: UKOME, Ulaşım Koordinasyon Müdürlüğü). The council, unlike other assemblies, cannot change its own rules of procedure, as these are set nationwide with the laws numbered 5216 and 5393 on Metropolitan Municipalities and Municipalities respectively.

== Structure ==
There are no separate elections held for the Metropolitan Municipal Council, the body comprises elected councillors from district municipal councils (Turkish: İlçe Belediye Meclisleri) of Istanbul. After local elections, one fifth of the elected district councillors are chosen to also represent their district in the metropolitan council. District mayors are considered "natural members" of the metropolitan municipal council, and thus are not counted in the one-fifth calculation. The elected metropolitan mayor serves as the President of the council until their term ends, and can exercise their veto power to send decisions back to deliberation. Decisions vetoed still only need a simple majority to pass again. The council meets every second week of the month on a day previously decided by the council. The mayor decides on a meeting day if no such day was agreed upon by the council beforehand.

== Municipal Commissions ==
The Municipal Council of Istanbul has a plenty of dedicated legislative commissions that are responsible for handling legislations forwarded by the Council within 10 work days. As per Metropolitan Municipalities Law of 2005, each commission shall have at least 5 members, and are limited by 9 members.

Members of each commission are selected for a one-year term, through voting at the Municipal Council of Istanbul.

As determined by law, 6 specific commissions has to exist and be operational in every municipality. Therefore, considering the needs of Istanbul, a city with over 15 million residents, the Municipal Council of Istanbul has 26 dedicated commissions that work under the Municipal Council of Istanbul.

List of current commissions are as stated below:

- Zoning and Public Works Commission
- Planning and Budget Commission
- Health and Epidemic Diseases Commission
- Transportation and Traffic Commission
- Education Commission
- Law Commission
- Tariffs Commission
- Mapping Commission
- European Union and External Relations Commission
- Tourism Commission
- Earthquake and Natural Disasters Commission
- Life Without Disabilities Commission
- Women, Family and Children Commission
- Urban Economy, Professional Chambers and Unions Commission
- Public Relations Commission
- Infrastructure, Residence and Estates Commission
- Basic Rights Commission
- Agriculture, Forestry, Husbandry and Water Products Commission
- Environment, Renewable Energy and Climate Change Commission
- Youth and Sports Commission
- Culture and Art Commission
- Social Services, Addiction Prevention and Rehabilitation Commission
- Urban Renovation Commission
- Subsidiaries and Affiliates Commission
- Smart City and Information Technologies Commission
- Migration, Immigrants and Refugees Commission
