= Istanbul Fire Department =

Fire and rescue service for Istanbul, Turkey

- İstanbul İtfaiyesi

Operational area
- Country: Turkey
- City: Istanbul

Agency overview
- Established: 1714
- Annual calls: 85,671
- Employees: 5,020
- Annual budget: $162,000,000 (FY 2024)
- Director-General: Remzi Albayrak
- EMS level: ALS & BLS

Facilities and equipment
- Divisions: 3
- Battalions: 41
- Stations: 129
- Ambulances: 71
- Helicopters: 1

Website
- https://itfaiye.ibb.gov.tr/en/

The Istanbul Fire Department (Turkish: İstanbul İtfaiyesi) is the main firefighting authority for Istanbul, Turkey. The department is organized under the Istanbul Metropolitan Municipality and is responsible for fire prevention, emergency medical services, technical rescue, maritime rescue, CBRN response and lifeguard services throughout the province.

The department is the biggest fire service among Turkey with 5,020 employees, 378 of them being volunteer firefighters at 30 volunteer stations. By 2023, 5,88% of the department is composed of female employees. Istanbul Fire Department is also supported by 561 medical professionals, including EMTs and paramedics responsible for running the auxiliary ambulance service. Most of the ambulances in Istanbul are operated by the Ministry of Health.

== History ==
=== Origins ===
The roots of firefighting in Constantinople date back to the 10th century. Under Byzantine rule, praefectus urbi was responsible for running the first fire brigade. There were 12 fire stations along the city. Water was brought from Strandzha mountains through aqueducts and firefighters had their own ancient apparatus. Even though the fire brigade was mostly successful in preventing fires, aqueducts were mostly damaged or burned during uprisings, preventing the brigade from operating normally.

After the Ottoman conquest, the city did not have any organized fire brigade for hundreds of years, causing even the smallest sparks to scdorch whole neighborhoods. Most of the buildings were made of wood and streets were narrow, which also intensified damage from fires. With an edict released by Murad III on 12 March 1579, everyone was asked to possess barrels filled with water and ladders that can reach roofs at home.

Ottomans first took fire prevention into consideration during Murad IV's reign by enacting restrictions against tobacco and coffee shops. Commoners were also asked to use stone for newer buildings.

=== Tulumbacılar (1714–1876) ===
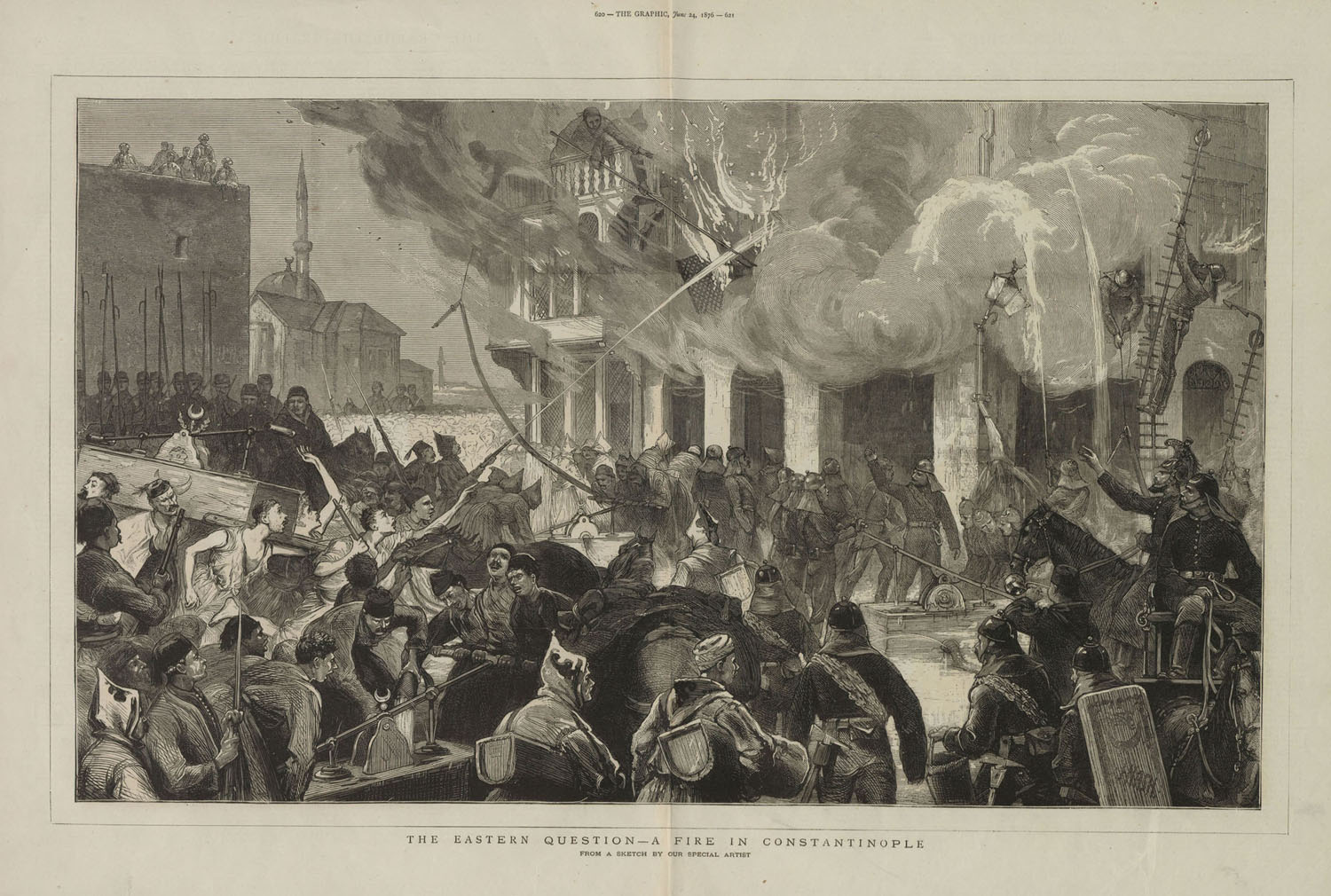
Tulumbacılar extinguishing a fire in Constantinople, 1876

David, a French technician serving in the Ottoman Navy, with his later name, the Actual David (Turkish: Gerçek Davud) is considered the founder of the Tulumbacılar Odjak, the first Ottoman fire brigade. He was often known for his outstanding performance against the Venetian Navy during the Ottoman–Venetian War. After witnessing the development and efficiency of firefighting apparatus in France, he invented tulumba, a similar tool combining water tank and fire hose. The name "Tulumbacılar" originates from tulumba.

The Tulumbacılar Odjak (Turkish: Tulumbacılar Ocağı) was organized under the Janissaries, being operational for 110 years until the Auspicious Incident, which caused the abolishment of the Janissaries, along with the Tulumbacılar. David was the first agha of the odjak.

Following its establishment, the Grand Vizier Ibrahim Pasha later allocated a headquarters and barracks for the odjak. The organization was composed of a few ortas led by Chorbajis, while each orta had a sergeant, a yamak sergeant, and Tulumbacı aghas. Ortas also had specialist roles, such as topçu tulumbacıbaşı, who was responsible for operating fire apparatus.

Tulumbacılar was disbanded in 1826 after the Auspicious Incident. For a few years, Tulumbacılar existed at local level as commoners organized themselves to extinguish fires using some of the old tulumbas. On 2 August 1826, a huge fire that destroyed a considerable part of Constantinople raised questions in regards of the lack of a fire brigade. Following the fire, in 1828, the Ottoman Empire put the Tulumbacılar Regulation (Turkish: Tulumbacılar Nizamnamesi) into effect, forming another form of tulumbacılar under the Asakir-i Mansure-i Muhammediye. 2 years of lacking a professional fire brigade was often called the "Interregnum of Firefighting". The new tulumbacılar did not have organizational integrity or dedicated fire stations. Firefighters were generally deployed at local police stations, along with their tulumbas. In 1871, another fire in Beyoğlu scorched 3,000 buildings as the tulumbacılar were insufficient in suppressing fires.

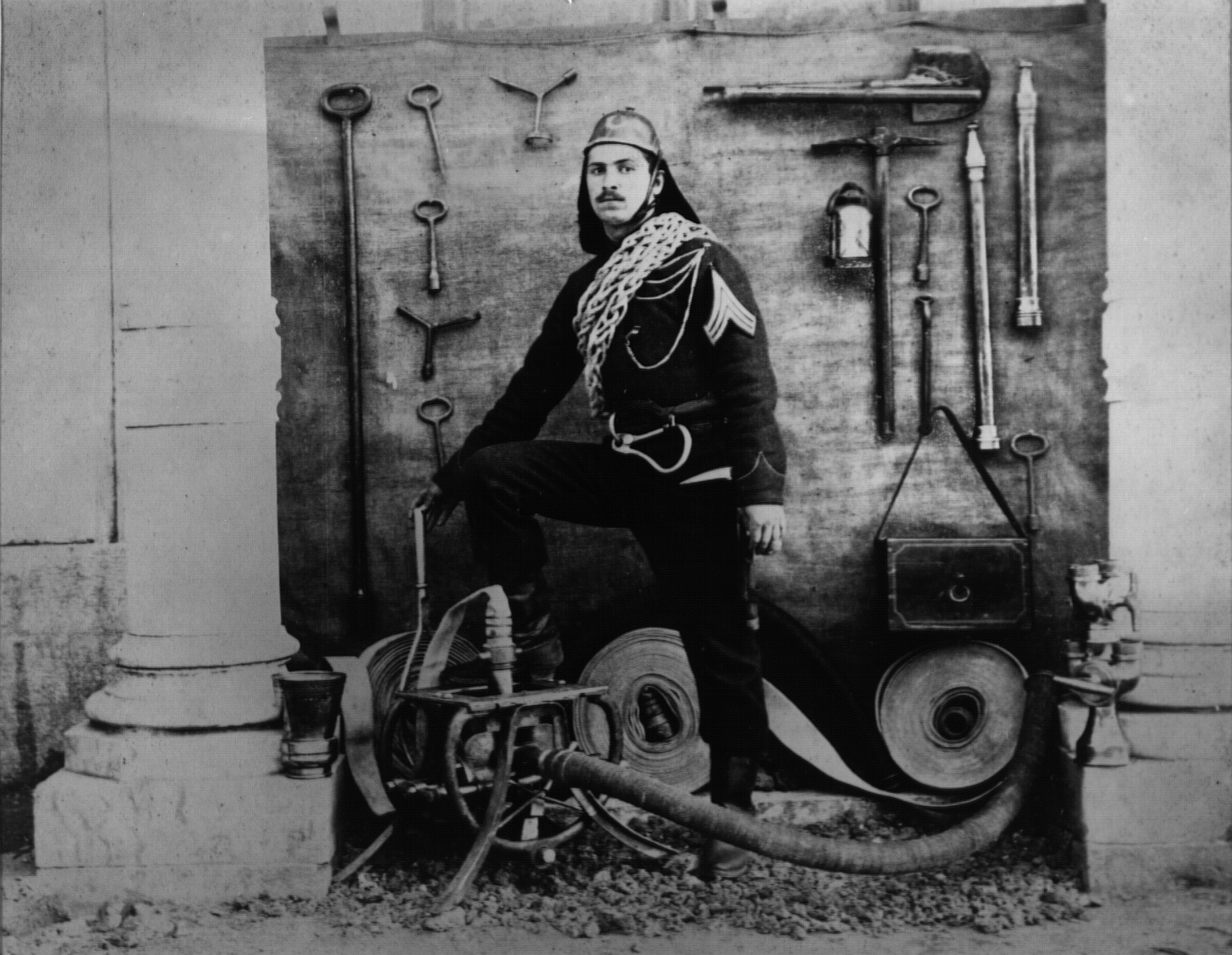
A Tulumbacı sergeant, 1800s

== Organisation ==
The Istanbul Fire Department is established under two directorates and three brigades:

- Emergency Relief & Rescue Directorate
- Fire Support Directorate
- Central Fire Brigade
- European Side Fire Brigade
- Anatolian Side Fire Brigade

=== Specialised teams ===
==== Heavy Urban Search and Rescue Teams ====
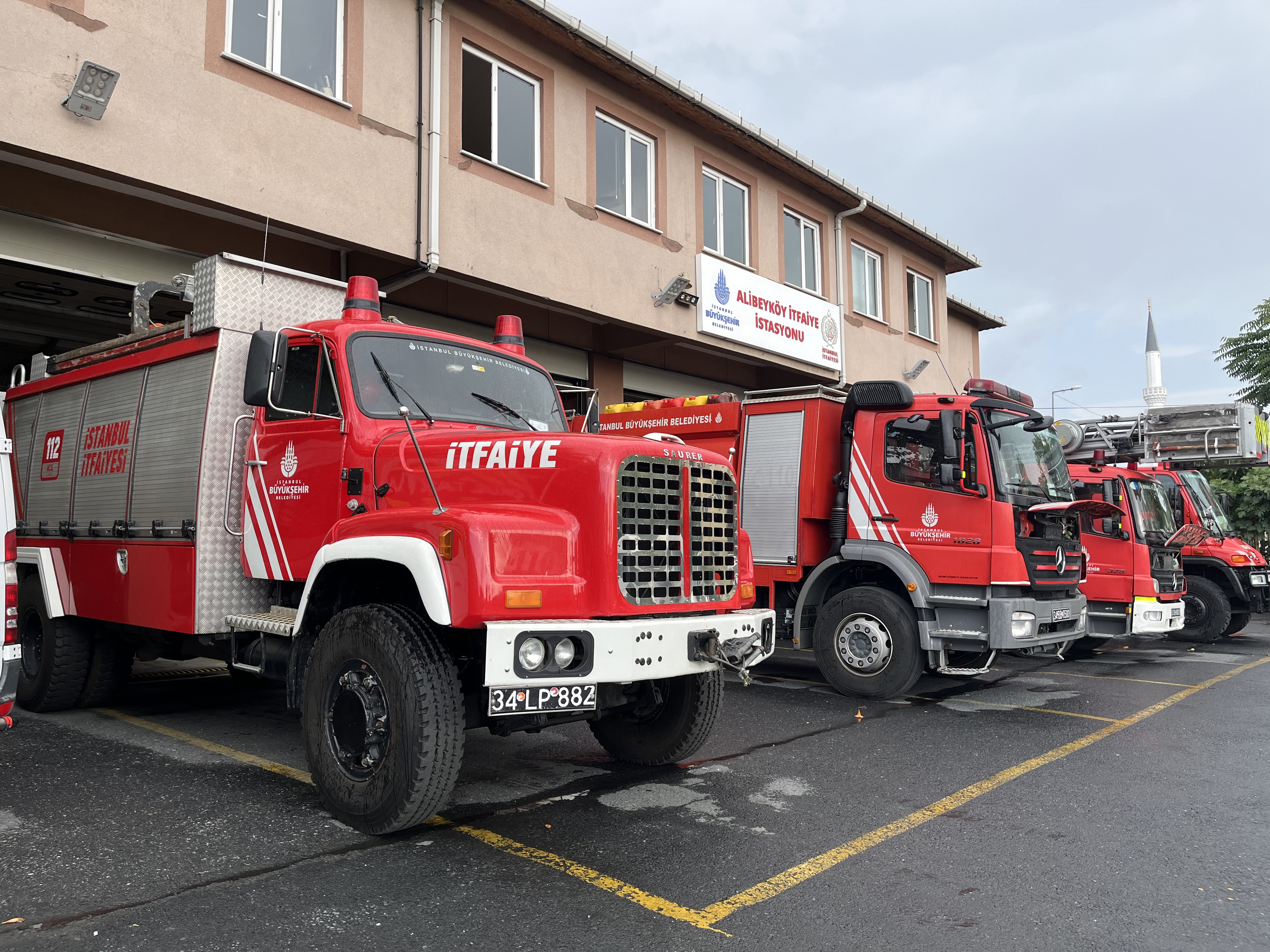
Fire engines in Istanbul

In 2022, the department commenced efforts to establish five Heavy Urban Search & Rescue Teams after an amendment to the Municipal Fire Code that allows one US&R team for each 3 million population. Istanbul Fire Department is still collaborating with the Disaster and Emergency Management Presidency for the establishment of five US&R teams throughout Istanbul.

Three of the US&R teams are planned to be deployed to the European side, while two planned for the Anatolian side. The department is also considering dedicated warehouses for each team.

==== K9 Search and Rescue Team ====
The dedicated K9 Search & Rescue Team was first established in 2022. The team is composed of 10 trainers and 10 search and rescue dogs, of which 5 are eligible to work in debris scenes. In 2023, the team was deployed eight times, including 2023 Turkey–Syria earthquakes.

==== Fire Underwater Search and Rescue Team ====
The Fire Underwater Search & Rescue Team is composed of 21 specialists and is able to perform maritime and underwater search and rescue operations up to 42 meters deep. The team holds many accreditations, including the military frogmen's certificate. Throughout 2023, the team was deployed for 134 incidents and is available for response 24/7.

=== Disaster Coordination Centre (AKOM) ===
The Disaster Coordination Centre (Turkish: Afet Koordinasyon Merkezi), or formally the Directorate for Disaster Affairs is an entity of the Istanbul Metropolitan Municipality tasked with coordinating the municipality's public safety and utility teams for disaster response.

The centre was established immediately after the 1999 İzmit earthquake.

== Ranks ==
İtfaiye Daire Başkanı rütbesi	İtfaiye Müdürü rütbesi	İtfaiye Şube Müdürü rütbesi	İtfaiye Birim Amiri rütbesi	İtfaiye Amiri rütbesi	Army-TUR-OR-05	Army-TUR-OR-04
Director-General İtfaiye Daire Başkanı	Director İtfaiye Müdürü	Superintendent Şube Müdürü	Unit Supervisor Birim Amiri	Fire Supervisor İtfaiye Amiri	Fire Sergeant İtfaiye Çavuşu	Firefighter İtfaiye Eri
