= Istanbul Planning Agency =

- İstanbul Planlama Ajansı
- Logo of the Istanbul Planning Agency
- Formation: 12 February 2020
- Headquarters: İPA Kampüs, Florya
- Director-General: Oktay Kargül
- Staff: 400
- Website: ipa.istanbul

Istanbul Planning Agency (Turkish: İstanbul Planlama Ajansı) is a municipally owned corporation of the Istanbul Metropolitan Municipality responsible for developing citywide socioeconomic strategies to tackle urban issues and match the Istanbul Vision 2050 plan.

It was founded in 2020, after the new leadership transformed an already existing municipal facility in Florya, which was used by previous mayors and other high-ranking AKP officials as a summer retreat.

== History ==
=== Origins ===
Invited by Mustafa Kemal Atatürk in 1933, Henri Prost is considered one of the most notable urban planners in Turkey. Named under "Prost Plan", his projects for Istanbul focused on preserving the cultural heritage and developing geometric, wide roads with diverse recreation areas, but it was not maintained as Prost had set the population limit for Istanbul at 800,000. The Turkish government eventually had to abandon the mass reconstruction and planning with the outbreak of World War II.

Following the Democratic Party rule of the 1950s, rural flights to Istanbul were intensified, disrupting the city's historical scheme. In 1966, the Ministry of Development and Housing established the Greater Istanbul Bureau of Master Plans, employing qualified urban planners to develop a long-term strategy for the city's planned growth.

== Structure ==
Located at İPA Kampüs in Florya with an additional office in Şişli, the agency consists of four offices and two integrated bodies:

- Vision 2050 Office
- Istanbul Statistical Office
- Public Design Office
- Social Policies Office
- IPA Institute
- IPA Habitat Innovation Center

The agency also runs a few websites:

- kanal.istanbul, to advocate against Erdoğan's Istanbul Canal project;
- marmara.istanbul, to increase public knowledge in regards of the mucilage crisis in the Sea of Marmara;
- konkur.istanbul, to hold urban planning/design contests for the future development of Istanbul;
- koru.istanbul, to develop an integrated strategy to conserve Istanbul's northern forests against urbanization and pollution.

== İPA Kampüs ==
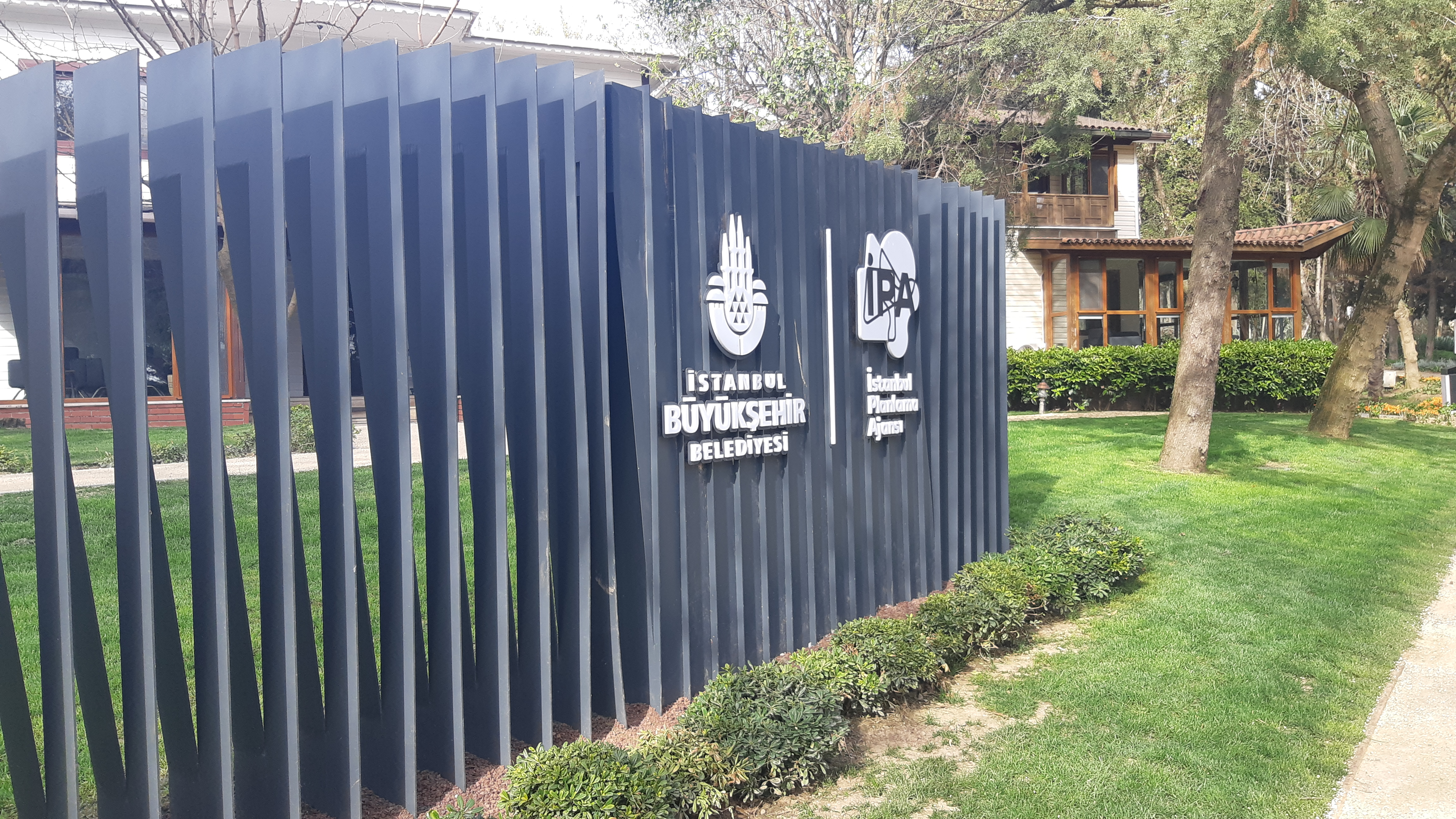
Entrance to the İPA Kampüs

İPA Kampüs is the main facility of the Istanbul Planning Agency. Prior to the 2019 elections, it was used as a summer retreat by previous mayors and high-ranking AKP officials. Shortly after the power shift to the social democrats, Mayor Ekrem İmamoğlu announced the agency with its introductory Istanbul Vision 2050 policy book, attracting interest by many academics and corporations.

The facility hosts courses and forums for student and industry professionals on a regular basis, in an attempt to increase the urban research in Turkey. Many other major cities established similar institutions following Istanbul. IPA Istanbul Library within the facility has over 20,000 books that are dedicated to urban studies, urban planning, architecture, local governments, and such, making it the largest library in Turkey of its field.

== Programs ==
=== Statistics ===
The Istanbul Statistical Office (Turkish: İstanbul İstatistik Ofisi) releases a variety of monthly and yearly bulletins, providing the public with information regarding Istanbul's economic, social, and urban issues. While Istanbul Barometer, released since January 2021, evaluates the Istanbulites' quality of life and opinions regarding the developments, the Kent Gündemi performs extensive academic researches for a diverse amount of topics; from inflation, homelessness, to transparent governance and urban renewal.
