= Nuri Aslan =

Turkish politician and businessman (born 1969)

Acting Mayor of Istanbul
- Incumbent
- Assumed office 26 March 2025
- Preceded by: Ekrem İmamoğlu

First Deputy Chairman of the Municipal Council of Istanbul
- In office 15 April 2024 – 26 March 2025

Personal details
- Born: 10 November 1968 (age 57) Sivas, Turkey
- Party: Republican People's Party
- Children: 3
- Education: Yıldız Technical University (BA)

Nuri Aslan (born 10 November 1968) is a Turkish politician and businessman who serves as the acting Mayor of Istanbul since 2025, following the arrest and suspension of Ekrem İmamoğlu. He is a member of the Republican People's Party (CHP) and has served as First Deputy Chairman of the Municipal Council of Istanbul from 2024 to 2025.

== Early life and education ==
Aslan was born in 1969 in Sivas, Turkey. He moved to Istanbul for his higher education and graduated from Yıldız Technical University in 1990, earning a degree in Naval Machinery Engineering. After completing his studies, he entered the private sector and became a General Manager, where he gained professional experience before transitioning into public service.

== Political career ==
Aslan's political journey began in 1999 when he was elected as a municipal council member for Küçükçekmece, Istanbul. Over the years, he held various influential positions in both civil society organizations and local government. He served as the Vice President of the Turkish Red Crescent in Küçükçekmece from 2009 to 2017, and as the President of the Beylikdüzü Business Association (BEYSİAD) from 2014 to 2018. Additionally, he was a board member of the Istanbul Industrialists Federation (İSİFED) between 2014 and 2021 and served as Vice President of the Sivas Koyulhisar Foundation (KODAV) from 2009 to 2020. Aslan was also a council member for Beylikdüzü City Council from 2011 to 2019.

In 2024, Aslan was re-elected as a council member for both Beylikdüzü Municipality and the Istanbul Metropolitan Municipality (IBB). On 15 April 2024, he was appointed First Deputy Chairman of the Municipal Council of Istanbul.

=== Acting mayor of Istanbul ===
With the suspension of Ekrem İmamoğlu, Aslan's nomination as the CHP candidate for acting Mayor of Istanbul was made to ensure continued governance by the municipality and to block the government from appointing a AKP-aligned trustee. Following three rounds of voting, Aslan secured victory with 177 votes, surpassing his AKP rival, Zeynel Abidin Okul, who received 125 votes. Aslan, alongside CHP leader Özgür Özel, said the position was entrusted to him temporarily and that he will continue the work Imamoglu has done, expressing full support for his previous work.

== Personal life ==
Aslan is married and has three children.

== See also ==
- Municipal Council of Istanbul
