= Istanbul Metropolitan Municipality =

Local government of Istanbul Province, Turkey

- İstanbul Büyükşehir Belediyesi
- Logo of the Istanbul Metropolitan Municipality
- Formation: 1930; 96 years ago
- Headquarters: Istanbul Municipal Palace, Saraçhane
- Mayor: Nuri Aslan (acting) since 26 March 2025
- Deputy Chairmen: Gökhan Gümüşdağ
- Main organ: Municipal Council of Istanbul
- Budget: $14,710 billion
- Revenue: $5,089 billion
- Expenses: $6,087 billion
- Staff: 12,734 employees ~76,000 at subsidiaries
- Website: ibb.istanbul

The Istanbul Metropolitan Municipality (Turkish: İstanbul Büyükşehir Belediyesi, İBB) is the government agency in charge of the municipal affairs of the Istanbul Province. It is one of the 30 metropolitan municipalities in Turkey.

== History ==
The Istanbul Metropolitan Municipality was established on 23 March 1984, following the enactment of the metropolitan municipality act on 8 March 1984. Initially, the municipality covered only the urban centers of Istanbul, which accounted for 35% of the Istanbul Province. The rest of the province was administered by the Istanbul Special Provincial Administration.

In July 2004, the concept of metropolitan municipality was redefined in Istanbul and Kocaeli, where thenceforth metropolitan municipality borders would overlap with provincial borders. This change enabled the Istanbul Metropolitan Municipality to extend its jurisdiction to the whole province, and to assume the responsibilities of the provincial government. The Istanbul Metropolitan Municipality now concentrates the competences of public management, while the Istanbul Special Provincial Administration's duties are limited to the building and maintenance of schools, residences, government buildings, and roads, and the promotion of arts, culture, and nature conservation.

== Organization ==
The Istanbul Metropolitan Municipality is divided into 39 district municipalities, which are the second-level local governments within the province. Each district municipality has its own mayor and council, elected by the local voters. The district municipalities are responsible for providing municipal services, such as water, sewerage, waste management, social assistance, health, education, culture, sports, and transportation, within their boundaries.

As of 2024, the Istanbul Metropolitan Municipality is organized as follows:

Mayor of Istanbul

- Legal Affairs Section
- Inspection Board
- Internal Audit Unit
- Board of Advisors
  Secretary-General of the Istanbul Metropolitan Municipality
  - Assistant Secretary-General
    - Directorate of Information Technologies
    - Directorate of Human Resources and Education
    - Directorate of Health Affairs
    - Directorate of Publications and Decrees
    - Directorate of Youth and Sport Services
  - Assistant Secretary-General
    - Directorate of Rail Systems
    - Directorate of Environmental Control and Protection
    - Directorate of Foreign Affairs
  - Assistant Secretary-General
    - Directorate of Press, Publications and Public Affairs
    - Directorate of Culture
    - Directorate of Cultural Assets
    - Directorate of Social Services
    - Directorate of Neighborhood Affairs
  - Assistant Secretary-General
    - Directorate of Earthquake Risk Management and Urban Improvement
    - Directorate of Development and Urbanism
    - Bosphorus Development Section
    - Directorate of Transportation
    - Directorate of Property Management
  - Assistant Secretary-General
    - Directrorate of Fiscal Services
    - Directorate of Subsidiaries Coordination
    - Directorate of Strategy Development
  - Assistant Secretary-General
    - Directorate of Support Services
    - Istanbul Fire Department
    - Istanbul Municipal Police Department
    - Directorate of Cemeteries
    - Directorate of Agricultural Services
  - Assistant Secretary-General
    - Directorate of Studies and Wrks
    - Directorate of Public Works
    - Directorate of Parks and Gardens
    - Directorate of Procurement
    - Directorate of Road Maintenance and Infrastructure Coordination
  - Directorate of Disaster Works
  - Istanbul Electricity, Tram and Tunnel Establishments
  - Istanbul Water and Sewerage Administration

=== Municipal subsidiaries ===
Aside from public safety and public works, the vast majority of daily operations within the Istanbul Metropolitan Municipality are run through municipally owned corporations, of which their absolute majority of shares are owned and managed by the municipality.

Name	Revenue	Employees	Description
İgdaş	$1,06B	2,287	
İstaç	$221,11M	4,866	
Metro Istanbul	$203,8M	3,648	
İstanbul Ağaç ve Peyzaj	$120,14M	3,733	
Kültür A.Ş.	$89,05M	688	
Spor İstanbul	$63,78M	782	
İspark	$46,88M	2,180	
İSTON	$40,32M	977	
Belbim	$31,3M	548	
Hamidiye Su	$28,63M	223	
İstanbul Halk Ekmek	$19,5M	611	
Beltur	$13,1M	998	
İsbak	$10,50M	601	
Medya A.Ş.	$8,44M	176	
Istanbul İmar	$3,27M	85	
Kiptaş	$1,91M	235	
İstanbul Ulaştırma	$0,95M	74	
Şehir Hatları	$0,22M	816	
Istanbul Planning Agency		400	

=== Independent bodies ===
- Ethics Commission
- Mediation Commission
- Transportation Coordination Center
- Infrastructure Coordination Center
- Istanbul Urban Council

== Governance ==
Composition of the Municipal Council of Istanbul CHP (185) AK Party (120) MHP (7) BBP (2)

The Municipal Council of Istanbul (Turkish: İstanbul Büyükşehir Belediye Meclisi) is the decision-making organ of the Istanbul Metropolitan Municipality.

It consists of 314 members, who are elected by the voters of the 39 districts for a five-year term. The council elects the Mayor and the Metropolitan Executive Committee from among its members. The council also approves the budget, plans, and policies of the municipality.

The last mayor of Istanbul was Ekrem İmamoğlu of the Republican People's Party (CHP), who was elected with 54.21 percent of the vote in the 2019 elections. He succeeded Ali Yerlikaya from the Justice and Development Party (AKP), who had ex-officio served as acting mayor in his capacity as governor of Istanbul Province after the March 2019 election was annulled by the Supreme Electoral Council. He was dismissed from his duty on March 23, 2025.

The Metropolitan Executive Committee is the executive organ of the Istanbul Metropolitan Municipality. It consists of 21 members, who are elected by the Municipal Council from among its members. The committee assists the mayor in implementing the decisions of the council, and supervises the activities of the municipal administration.

In the 2024 local elections, İmamoğlu was reelected with 51.15% of the vote. Additionally, the CHP won 26 of the 39 districts in Istanbul and a majority in the Istanbul Municipal Council.

== See also ==
- List of mayors of Istanbul
- Metropolitan municipalities in Turkey
