= List of neighbourhoods of Istanbul =

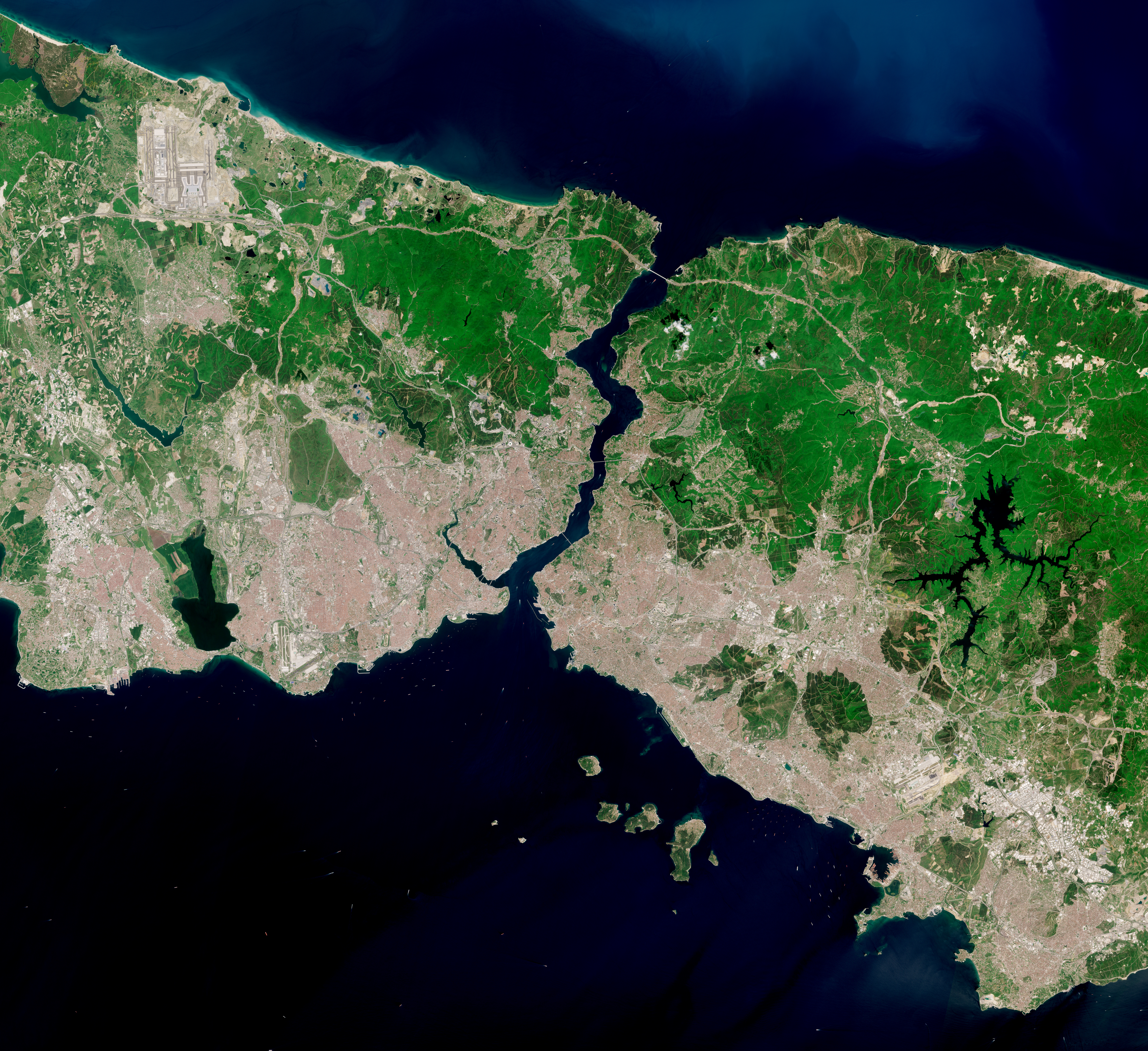
Satellite view of Istanbul and the strait of Bosporus

This is a list of neighbourhoods (Turkish: mahalle) of Istanbul, Turkey, classified by the districts of Istanbul. Neighbourhoods are not considered an administrative division of the districts, but they have legally established borders and a "head man" (called muhtar in Turkish) who are elected by universal suffrage and have minor duties like certifying copies of certain documents, especially one related to the "official residence" of the people living in the neighbourhood. (Turkish legislation requires presenting an official "certificate of residence" for several needs of the citizens and resident foreigners alike; such as enrolling in electoral registers or for applying to a job that requires being a resident of the concerned district or province, or for requesting certain public or municipal services.)

Other than these traditional and officially recognised mahalles or neighbourhoods, there are also quarters, or localities (in Turkish: semt) which do not have officially determined borders and the word is used in a more casual way; in sometimes referring to more than one mahalle or in others only one, which may have an official name and a traditional one, or the neighbourhood doesn’t have a neighbourhood unit and borders.

== Neighbourhoods by districts ==
=== Adalar ===
1. Burgazada
2. Heybeliada
3. Kınalıada
4. Maden
5. Nizam

=== Arnavutköy ===
1. Anadolu
2. Arnavutköy İmrahor
3. Arnavutköy İslambey
4. Arnavutköy Merkez
5. Arnavutköy Yavuzselim
6. Atatürk
7. Bahşayış
8. Boğazköy Atatürk
9. Boğazköy İstiklal
10. Boğazköy Merkez
11. Bolluca
12. Deliklikaya
13. Dursunköy
14. Durusu Cami
15. Durusu Zafer
16. Hastane
17. İstasyon
18. Sazlıbosna
19. Nakkaş
20. Karlıbayır
21. Haraççı
22. Hicret
23. Mavigöl
24. Nenehatun
25. Ömerli
26. Taşoluk
27. Taşoluk Adnan Menderes
28. Taşoluk Çilingir
29. Taşoluk Fatih
30. Taşoluk M. Fevzi Çakmak
31. Taşoluk Mehmet Akif Ersoy
32. Yeşilbayır

=== Ataşehir ===
1. Aşıkveysel, Ataşehir
2. Atatürk, Ataşehir
3. Barbaros, Ataşehir
4. Esatpaşa, Ataşehir
5. Ferhatpaşa, Ataşehir
6. Fetih, Ataşehir
7. İçerenköy, Ataşehir
8. İnönü, Ataşehir
9. Kayışdağı, Ataşehir
10. Küçükbakkalköy, Ataşehir
11. Mevlana, Ataşehir
12. Mimarsinan, Ataşehir
13. Mustafa Kemal, Ataşehir
14. Örnek, Ataşehir
15. Yeniçamlıca, Ataşehir
16. Yenişehir, Ataşehir
17. Yenisahra, Ataşehir

=== Avcılar ===
1. Ambarlı, Avcılar
2. Cihangir, Avcılar
3. Denizköşkler, Avcılar
4. Firuzköy, Avcılar
5. Gümüşpala, Avcılar
6. Merkez, Avcılar
7. Mustafa Kemal Paşa, Avcılar
8. Tahtakale, Avcılar
9. Üniversite, Avcılar
10. Yeşilkent, Avcılar

=== Bağcılar ===
1. Bağlar, Bağcılar
2. Barbaros, Bağcılar
3. Çınar, Bağcılar
4. Demirkapı, Bağcılar
5. Evren, Bağcılar
6. Fatih, Bağcılar
7. Fevzi Çakmak, Bağcılar
8. Göztepe, Bağcılar
9. Güneşli, Bağcılar
10. Hürriyet, Bağcılar
11. İnönü, Bağcılar
12. Kâzım Karabekir, Bağcılar
13. Kemalpaşa, Bağcılar
14. Kirazlı, Bağcılar
15. Mahmutbey, Bağcılar
16. Merkez, Bağcılar
17. Sancaktepe, Bağcılar
18. Yavuzselim, Bağcılar
19. Yenigün, Bağcılar
20. Yenimahalle, Bağcılar
21. Yıldıztepe, Bağcılar
22. Yüzyıl, Bağcılar

=== Bahçelievler ===
1. Bahçelievler, Bahçelievler
2. Cumhuriyet, Bahçelievler
3. Çobançeşme, Bahçelievler
4. Fevzi Çakmak, Bahçelievler
5. Hürriyet, Bahçelievler
6. Kocasinan, Bahçelievler
7. Siyavuşpaşa, Bahçelievler
8. Soğanlı, Bahçelievler
9. Şirinevler, Bahçelievler
10. Yenibosna, Bahçelievler
11. Zafer, Bahçelievler

=== Bakırköy ===
1. Ataköy 1. kısım, Bakırköy
2. Ataköy 2–5–6. kısım, Bakırköy
3. Ataköy 3–4–11. kısım, Bakırköy
4. Ataköy 7-8-9-10. kısım, Bakırköy
5. Basınköy, Bakırköy
6. Cevizlik, Bakırköy
7. Kartaltepe, Bakırköy
8. Osmaniye, Bakırköy
9. Sakızağacı, Bakırköy
10. Şenlikköy, Bakırköy
11. Yenimahalle, Bakırköy
12. Yeşilköy
13. Yeşilyurt
14. Zeytinlik, Bakırköy
15. Zuhuratbaba, Bakırköy

=== Başakşehir ===
1. Altınşehir, Başakşehir
2. Bahçeşehir 1. Kısım, Başakşehir
3. Bahçeşehir 2. Kısım, Başakşehir
4. Başak, Başakşehir
5. Başakşehir, Başakşehir
6. Güvercintepe, Başakşehir
7. Kayabaşı, Başakşehir
8. Şahintepe, Başakşehir
9. Ziya Gökalp, Başakşehir

=== Bayrampaşa ===
1. Altıntepsi, Bayrampaşa
2. Cevatpaşa, Bayrampaşa
3. İsmetpaşa, Bayrampaşa
4. Kartaltepe, Bayrampaşa
5. Kocatepe, Bayrampaşa
6. Muratpaşa, Bayrampaşa
7. Orta, Bayrampaşa
8. Terazidere, Bayrampaşa
9. Vatan, Bayrampaşa
10. Yenidoğan, Bayrampaşa
11. Yıldırım, Bayrampaşa

=== Beşiktaş ===
1. Abbasağa
2. Akatlar
3. Arnavutköy
4. Balmumcu
5. Bebek
6. Cihannüma
7. Dikilitaş
8. Etiler
9. Gayrettepe
10. Konaklar
11. Kuruçeşme
12. Kültür
13. Levazım
14. Levent
15. Mecidiye
16. Muradiye
17. Nisbetiye
18. Ortaköy
19. Sinanpaşa
20. Türkali
21. Ulus
22. Vişnezade
23. Yıldız

=== Beykoz ===
1. Acarlar, Beykoz
2. Anadoluhisarı, Beykoz
3. Anadolukavağı, Beykoz
4. Baklacı, Beykoz
5. Çamlıbahçe, Beykoz
6. Çengeldere, Beykoz
7. Çiftlik, Beykoz
8. Çiğdem, Beykoz
9. Çubuklu, Beykoz
10. Fatih, Beykoz
11. Göksu, Beykoz
12. Göztepe, Beykoz
13. Gümüşsuyu, Beykoz
14. İncirköy, Beykoz
15. Kanlıca, Beykoz
16. Kavacık, Beykoz
17. Merkez, Beykoz
18. Ortaçeşme, Beykoz
19. Paşabahçe, Beykoz
20. Rüzgarlıbahçe, Beykoz
21. Soğuksu, Beykoz
22. Tokatköy, Beykoz
23. Yalıköy, Beykoz
24. Yavuz Selim, Beykoz
25. Yenimahalle, Beykoz

=== Beylikdüzü ===
1. Adnan Kahveci, Beylikdüzü
2. Barış, Beylikdüzü
3. Büyükşehir, Beylikdüzü
4. Cumhuriyet, Beylikdüzü
5. Dereağzı, Beylikdüzü
6. Gürpınar, Beylikdüzü
7. Kavaklı, Beylikdüzü
8. Marmara, Beylikdüzü
9. Sahil, Beylikdüzü
10. Yakuplu, Beylikdüzü

=== Beyoğlu ===
1. Arapcami, Beyoğlu
2. Asmalımescit, Beyoğlu
3. Bedrettin, Beyoğlu
4. Bereketzade, Beyoğlu
5. Bostan, Beyoğlu
6. Bülbül, Beyoğlu
7. Camiikebir, Beyoğlu
8. Cihangir
9. Çatmamescit, Beyoğlu
10. Çukur, Beyoğlu
11. Emekyemez, Beyoğlu
12. Evliya Çelebi, Beyoğlu
13. Fetihtepe, Beyoğlu
14. Firuzağa, Beyoğlu
15. Gümüşsuyu, Beyoğlu
16. Hacıahmet, Beyoğlu
17. Hacımimi, Beyoğlu
18. Halıcıoğlu, Beyoğlu
19. Hüseyinağa, Beyoğlu
20. İstiklal, Beyoğlu
21. Kadı Mehmet Efendi, Beyoğlu
22. Kamerhatun, Beyoğlu
23. Kalyoncukulluğu, Beyoğlu
24. Kaptanpaşa, Beyoğlu
25. Katip Mustafa Çelebi, Beyoğlu
26. Keçecipiri, Beyoğlu
27. Kemankeş Kara Mustafa Paşa, Beyoğlu
28. Kılıçalipaşa, Beyoğlu
29. Kocatepe, Beyoğlu
30. Kulaksız, Beyoğlu
31. Kuloğlu, Beyoğlu
32. Küçükpiyale, Beyoğlu
33. Müeyyetzade, Beyoğlu
34. Ömeravni, Beyoğlu
35. Örnektepe, Beyoğlu
36. Piripaşa, Beyoğlu
37. Piyalepaşa, Beyoğlu
38. Pürtelaş, Beyoğlu
39. Sururi, Beyoğlu
40. Sütlüce, Beyoğlu
41. Şahkulu, Beyoğlu
42. Şehit Muhtar, Beyoğlu
43. Tomtom, Beyoğlu
44. Yahya Kahya, Beyoğlu
45. Yenişehir, Beyoğlu

=== Büyükçekmece ===
1. 19 Mayıs, Büyükçekmece
2. Ahmediye, Büyükçekmece
3. Alkent, Büyükçekmece
4. Atatürk, Büyükçekmece
5. Bahçelievler, Büyükçekmece
6. Batıköy, Büyükçekmece
7. Celaliye, Büyükçekmece
8. Cumhuriyet, Büyükçekmece
9. Çakmaklı, Büyükçekmece
10. Dizdariye, Büyükçekmece
11. Fatih, Büyükçekmece
12. Güzelce, Büyükçekmece
13. Hürriyet, Büyükçekmece
14. Kamiloba, Büyükçekmece
15. Karaağaç, Büyükçekmece
16. Kumburgaz Merkez, Büyükçekmece
17. Mimarsinan, Büyükçekmece
18. Muratbey, Büyükçekmece
19. Muratçeşme, Büyükçekmece
20. Pınartepe, Büyükçekmece
21. Türkoba, Büyükçekmece
22. Ulus, Büyükçekmece
23. Yenimahalle, Büyükçekmece

=== Çatalca ===
1. Binkılıç, Çatalca
2. Çakıl, Çatalca
3. Çiftlikköy, Çatalca
4. Fatih, Çatalca
5. Ferhatpaşa, Çatalca
6. İzettin, Çatalca
7. Kaleiçi, Çatalca
8. Karacaköy, Çatalca
9. Ovayenice, Çatalca

=== Çekmeköy ===
1. Alemdağ, Çekmeköy
2. Aydınlar, Çekmeköy
3. Cumhuriyet, Çekmeköy
4. Çamlık, Çekmeköy
5. Çatalmeşe, Çekmeköy
6. Ekşioğlu, Çekmeköy
7. Güngören, Çekmeköy
8. Hamidiye, Çekmeköy
9. Kirazlıdere, Çekmeköy
10. Mehmet Akif, Çekmeköy
11. Merkez, Çekmeköy
12. Mimar Sinan, Çekmeköy
13. Nişantepe, Çekmeköy
14. Ömerli, Çekmeköy
15. Soğukpınar, Çekmeköy
16. Sultançiftliği, Çekmeköy
17. Taşdelen, Çekmeköy

=== Esenler ===
1. Birlik, Esenler
2. Çiftehavuzlar, Esenler
3. Davutpaşa, Esenler
4. Fatih, Esenler
5. Fevzi Çakmak, Esenler
6. Havaalanı, Esenler
7. Kâzım Karabekir, Esenler
8. Kemer, Esenler
9. Menderes, Esenler
10. Mimarsinan, Esenler
11. Namık Kemal, Esenler
12. Nenehatun, Esenler
13. Oruçreis, Esenler
14. Tuna, Esenler
15. Turgutreis, Esenler
16. Yavuz Selim, Esenler

=== Esenyurt ===
1. Ardıçlıevler, Esenyurt
2. Atatürk, Esenyurt
3. Cumhuriyet, Esenyurt
4. Çakmaklı, Esenyurt
5. Esenkent, Esenyurt
6. Fatih, Esenyurt
7. Güzelyurt (Haramidere), Esenyurt
8. İncirtepe, Esenyurt
9. İnönü, Esenyurt
10. İstiklal, Esenyurt
11. Mehterçeşme, Esenyurt
12. Merkez, Esenyurt
13. Namik Kemal, Esenyurt
14. Örnek, Esenyurt
15. Pınar, Esenyurt
16. Saadetdere, Esenyurt
17. Sanayii, Esenyurt
18. Talatpasa, Esenyurt
19. Yenikent, Esenyurt
20. Yeşilkent, Esenyurt

=== Eyüpsultan ===
1. Akşemsettin, Eyüpsultan
2. Alibeyköy, Eyüpsultan
3. Çırçır, Eyüpsultan
4. Defterdar, Eyüpsultan
5. Düğmeciler, Eyüpsultan
6. Emniyettepe, Eyüpsultan
7. Esentepe, Eyüpsultan
8. Merkez, Eyüpsultan
9. Göktürk, Eyüpsultan
10. Güzeltepe, Eyüpsultan
11. İslambey, Eyüpsultan
12. Karadolap, Eyüpsultan
13. Mimarsinan, Eyüpsultan
14. Mithatpaşa, Eyüpsultan
15. Nişanca, Eyüpsultan
16. Rami Cuma, Eyüpsultan
17. Rami Yeni, Eyüpsultan
18. Sakarya, Eyüpsultan
19. Silahtarağa, Eyüpsultan
20. Topçular, Eyüpsultan
21. Yeşilpınar, Eyüpsultan

=== Fatih ===
1. Aksaray, Fatih
2. Akşemsettin, Fatih
3. Alemdar, Fatih
4. Ali Kuşçu, Fatih
5. Atikali, Fatih
6. Ayvansaray, Fatih
7. Balabanağa, Fatih
8. Balat, Fatih
9. Beyazıt, Fatih
10. Binbirdirek, Fatih
11. Cankurtaran, Fatih
12. Cerrahpaşa, Fatih
13. Cibali, Fatih
14. Demirtaş, Fatih
15. Derviş Ali, Fatih
16. Eminsinan, Fatih
17. Hacıkadın, Fatih
18. Hasekisultan, Fatih
19. Hırkaişerif, Fatih
20. Hobyar, Fatih
21. Hoca Giyasettin, Fatih
22. Hocapaşa, Fatih
23. İskenderpaşa, Fatih
24. Kalenderhane, Fatih
25. Karagümrük, Fatih
26. Katip Kasım, Fatih
27. Kemalpaşa, Fatih
28. Kocamustafapaşa, Fatih
29. Küçükayasofya, Fatih
30. Mercan, Fatih
31. Mesihpaşa, Fatih
32. Mevlanakapı, Fatih
33. Mimar Hayrettin, Fatih
34. Mimar Kemalettin, Fatih
35. Mollafenari, Fatih
36. Mollagürani, Fatih
37. Mollahüsrev, Fatih
38. Muhsinehatun, Fatih
39. Nişanca, Fatih
40. Rüstempaşa, Fatih
41. Saraçishak, Fatih
42. Sarıdemir, Fatih
43. Seyyid Ömer, Fatih
44. Silivrikapı, Fatih
45. Sultanahmet, Fatih
46. Sururi, Fatih
47. Süleymaniye, Fatih
48. Sümbülefendi, Fatih
49. Şehremini, Fatih
50. Şehsuvarbey, Fatih
51. Tahtakale, Fatih
52. Tayahatun, Fatih
53. Topkapı, Fatih
54. Yavuzsinan, Fatih
55. Yavuz Sultan Selim, Fatih
56. Yedikule, Fatih
57. Zeyrek, Fatih

=== Gaziosmanpaşa ===
1. Bağlarbaşı
2. Barbaros Hayrettin Paşa
3. Fevzi Çakmak
4. Hürriyet
5. Karadeniz
6. Karayolları
7. Karlıtepe
8. Kâzım Karabekir
9. Merkez
10. Mevlana
11. Pazariçi
12. Sarıgöl
13. Şemsipaşa
14. Yenidoğan
15. Yenimahalle
16. Yıldıztabya

=== Güngören ===
1. Akıncılar, Güngören
2. Abdurrahman Nafiz Gürman, Güngören
3. Gençosman, Güngören
4. Güneştepe, Güngören
5. Güven, Güngören
6. Haznedar, Güngören
7. Mareşal Fevzi Çakmak, Güngören
8. Mehmet Nezih Özmen, Güngören
9. Merkez, Güngören
10. Sanayi, Güngören
11. Tozkoparan, Güngören

=== Kadıköy ===
1. 19 Mayıs, Kadıköy
2. Acıbadem, Kadıköy
3. Bostancı, Kadıköy
4. Caddebostan, Kadıköy
5. Caferağa, Kadıköy
6. Dumlupınar, Kadıköy
7. Eğitim, Kadıköy
8. Erenköy, Kadıköy
9. Fenerbahçe, Kadıköy
10. Feneryolu, Kadıköy
11. Fikirtepe, Kadıköy
12. Göztepe, Kadıköy
13. Hasanpaşa, Kadıköy
14. Koşuyolu, Kadıköy
15. Kozyatağı, Kadıköy
16. Merdivenköy, Kadıköy
17. Osmanağa, Kadıköy
18. Rasimpaşa, Kadıköy
19. Sahrayıcedid, Kadıköy
20. Suadiye, Kadıköy
21. Zühtüpaşa, Kadıköy

=== Kağıthane ===
1. Çağlayan
2. Çeliktepe
3. Gültepe
4. Emniyet
5. Gürsel
6. Hamidiye
7. Harmantepe
8. Hürriyet
9. Mehmet Akif Ersoy
10. Merkez
11. Nurtepe
12. Ortabayır
13. Sanayi
14. Seyrantepe
15. Şirintepe
16. Talatpaşa
17. Telsizler
18. Yahya Kemal
19. Yeşilce

=== Kartal ===
1. Atalar, Kartal
2. Cevizli, Kartal
3. Cumhuriyet, Kartal
4. Çavuşoğlu, Kartal
5. Esentepe, Kartal
6. Gümüşpınar, Kartal
7. Hürriyet, Kartal
8. Karlıktepe, Kartal
9. Kordonboyu, Kartal
10. Orhantepe, Kartal
11. Ortamahalle, Kartal
12. Petrol-İş, Kartal
13. Soğanlık, Kartal
14. Topselvi, Kartal
15. Uğur Mumcu, Kartal
16. Yakacık Çarşı, Kartal
17. Yakacık Yeni, Kartal
18. Yalı, Kartal
19. Yukarımahalle, Kartal
20. Yunus, Kartal

=== Küçükçekmece ===
1. Atakent, Küçükçekmece
2. Atatürk, Küçükçekmece
3. Beşyol, Küçükçekmece
4. Cennet, Küçükçekmece
5. Cumhuriyet, Küçükçekmece
6. Fatih, Küçükçekmece
7. Fevzi Çakmak, Küçükçekmece
8. Gültepe, Küçükçekmece
9. Halkalı, Küçükçekmece
10. İnönü, Küçükçekmece
11. İstasyon, Küçükçekmece
12. Kanarya, Küçükçekmece
13. Kartaltepe, Küçükçekmece
14. Kemalpaşa, Küçükçekmece
15. Mehmet Akif, Küçükçekmece
16. Söğütlüçeşme, Küçükçekmece
17. Sultanmurat, Küçükçekmece
18. Tevfikbey, Küçükçekmece
19. Yarımburgaz, Küçükçekmece
20. Yenimahalle, Küçükçekmece
21. Yeşilova, Küçükçekmece

=== Maltepe ===
1. Altayçeşme, Maltepe
2. Altıntepe, Maltepe
3. Aydınevler, Maltepe
4. Bağlarbaşı, Maltepe
5. Başıbüyük, Maltepe
6. Büyükbakkalköy, Maltepe
7. Cevizli, Maltepe
8. Çınar, Maltepe
9. Esenkent, Maltepe
10. Feyzullah, Maltepe
11. Fındıklı, Maltepe
12. Girne, Maltepe
13. Gülensu, Maltepe
14. Gülsuyu, Maltepe
15. İdealtepe, Maltepe
16. Küçükyalı, Maltepe
17. Yalı, Maltepe
18. Zümrütevler, Maltepe

=== Pendik ===
1. Ahmet Yesevi, Pendik
2. Bahçelievler, Pendik
3. Batı, Pendik
4. Çamçeşme, Pendik
5. Çamlık, Pendik
6. Çınardere, Pendik
7. Doğu, Pendik
8. Dumlupınar, Pendik
9. Ertuğrulgazi, Pendik
10. Esenler, Pendik
11. Esenyalı, Pendik
12. Fatih, Pendik
13. Fevzi Çakmak, Pendik
14. Güllübağlar, Pendik
15. Güzelyalı, Pendik
16. Harmandere, Pendik
17. Kavakpınar, Pendik
18. Kaynarca, Pendik
19. Kurtköy, Pendik
20. Orhangazi, Pendik
21. Orta, Pendik
22. Ramazanoğlu, Pendik
23. Sanayi, Pendik
24. Sapanbağları, Pendik
25. Sülüntepe, Pendik
26. Şeyhli, Pendik
27. Velibaba, Pendik
28. Yayalar, Pendik
29. Yenimahalle, Pendik
30. Yenişehir, Pendik
31. Yeşilbağlar, Pendik

=== Sancaktepe ===
1. Abdurrahmangazi, Sancaktepe
2. Akpınar, Sancaktepe
3. Atatürk, Sancaktepe
4. Emek, Sancaktepe
5. Eyüpsultan, Sancaktepe
6. Fatih, Sancaktepe
7. Hilal, Sancaktepe
8. İnönü, Sancaktepe
9. Kemal Türkler, Sancaktepe
10. Meclis, Sancaktepe
11. Merve, Sancaktepe
12. Mevlana, Sancaktepe
13. Osmangazi, Sancaktepe
14. Safa, Sancaktepe
15. Sarıgazi, Sancaktepe
16. Veysel Karani, Sancaktepe
17. Yenidoğan, Sancaktepe
18. Yunus Emre, Sancaktepe

=== Sarıyer ===
1. Ayazağa
2. Baltalimanı
3. Bahçeköy Kemer
4. Bahçeköy
5. Bahçeköy Yenimahalle
6. Büyükdere
7. Cumhuriyet
8. Çayırbaşı
9. Darüşşafaka
10. Derbent
11. Emirgân
12. Fatih Sultan Mehmet
13. Ferahevler
14. Huzur
15. İstinye
16. Kâzım Karabekir
17. Kireçburnu
18. Kocataş
19. Maden
20. Maslak
21. Pınar
22. Poligon
23. PTT Evleri
24. Reşitpaşa
25. Rumelihisarı
26. Rumelikavağı
27. Merkez, Sarıyer
28. Tarabya
29. Yeniköy
30. Yenimahalle

=== Silivri ===
1. Alibey
2. Alipaşa
3. Büyük Çavuşlu
4. Cumhuriyet
5. Çanta Fatih
6. Çanta Mimarsinan
7. Değirmenköy İsmetpaşa
8. Değirmenköy Fevzipaşa
9. Fatih
10. Gazitepe
11. Gümüşyaka
12. Kadıköy
13. Kavaklı Hürriyet
14. Kavaklı Cumhuriyet
15. Küçük Kılıçlı
16. Mimarsinan
17. Ortaköy
18. Piri Mehmet Paşa
19. Selimpaşa
20. Semizkumlar
21. Yeni Mahalle
22. Yolçatı

=== Sultanbeyli ===
1. Abdurrahmangazi
2. Adil
3. Ahmet Yesevi
4. Akşemsettin
5. Battalgazi
6. Fatih
7. Hamidiye
8. Hasanpaşa
9. Mecidiye
10. Mehmet Akif
11. Mimarsinan
12. Necip Fazıl
13. Orhangazi
14. Turgutreis
15. Yavuz Selim

=== Sultangazi ===
1. 50. Yıl
2. 75. Yıl
3. Cebeci
4. Cumhuriyet
5. Esentepe
6. Eski Habibler
7. Gazi
8. Habibler
9. İsmetpaşa
10. Malkoçoğlu
11. Sultançiftliği
12. Uğur Mumcu
13. Yayla
14. Yunusemre
15. Zübeydehanım

=== Şile ===
1. Ağva
2. Balibey
3. Çavuş
4. Hacıkasım
5. Kumbaba

=== Şişli ===
1. 19 Mayıs
2. Bozkurt
3. Cumhuriyet
4. Duatepe
5. Ergenekon
6. Esentepe
7. Eskişehir
8. Feriköy
9. Fulya
10. Gülbahar
11. Halaskargazi
12. Halide Edip Adıvar
13. Halil Rıfat Paşa
14. Harbiye
15. İnönü
16. İzzetpaşa
17. Kaptanpaşa
18. Kuştepe
19. Mahmut Şevket Paşa
20. Mecidiyeköy
21. Merkez
22. Meşrutiyet
23. Paşa
24. Teşvikiye
25. Yayla

=== Tuzla ===
1. Anadolu
2. Aydınlı
3. Aydıntepe
4. Cami
5. Evliya Çelebi
6. Fatih
7. Fırat
8. İçmeler
9. İstasyon
10. Mescit
11. Mimarsinan
12. Orhanlı
13. Orta
14. Postane
15. Şifa
16. Tepeören
17. Yayla

=== Ümraniye ===
1. Adem Yavuz
2. Altınşehir
3. Armağanevler
4. Aşağıdudullu
5. Ataken
6. Atatürk
7. Cemil Meriç
8. Çakmak
9. Çamlık
10. Dumlupınar
11. Elmalıkent
12. Esenevler
13. Esenşehir
14. Fatih Sultan Mehmet
15. Hekimbaşı
16. Huzur
17. Ihlamurkuyu
18. İnkılap
19. İstiklal
20. Kâzım Karabekir
21. Mehmet Akif
22. Madenler
23. Namık Kemal
24. Necip Fazıl
25. Parseller
26. Saray
27. Site
28. Şerifali
29. Tantavi
30. Tatlısu
31. Tepeüstü
32. Topağacı
33. Yamanevler
34. Yeni Sanayi
35. Yukarıdudullu

=== Üsküdar ===
1. Acıbadem
2. Ahmediye
3. Altunizade
4. Aziz Mahmud Hüdayi
5. Bahçelievler
6. Barbaros
7. Beylerbeyi
8. Bulgurlu
9. Burhaniye
10. Cumhuriyet
11. Çengelköy
12. Ferah
13. Güzeltepe
14. İcadiye
15. Kandilli
16. Kirazlıtepe
17. Kısıklı
18. Kuleli
19. Kuzguncuk
20. Küçük Çamlıca
21. Küçüksu
22. Küplüce
23. Mehmet Akif Ersoy
24. Mimar Sinan
25. Murat Reis
26. Salacak iguat
27. Selami Ali
28. Selimiye
29. Sultantepe
30. Ünalan
31. Valide-i Atik
32. Yavuztürk
33. Zeynep Kamil

=== Zeytinburnu ===
1. Beştelsiz
2. Çırpıcı
3. Gökalp
4. Kazlıçeşme
5. Maltepe
6. Merkezefendi
7. Nuripaşa
8. Seyitnizam
9. Sümer
10. Telsiz
11. Veliefendi
12. Yenidoğan
13. Yeşiltepe
