= Çobançeşme station =

Station of the Istanbul Metro

Çobançeşme
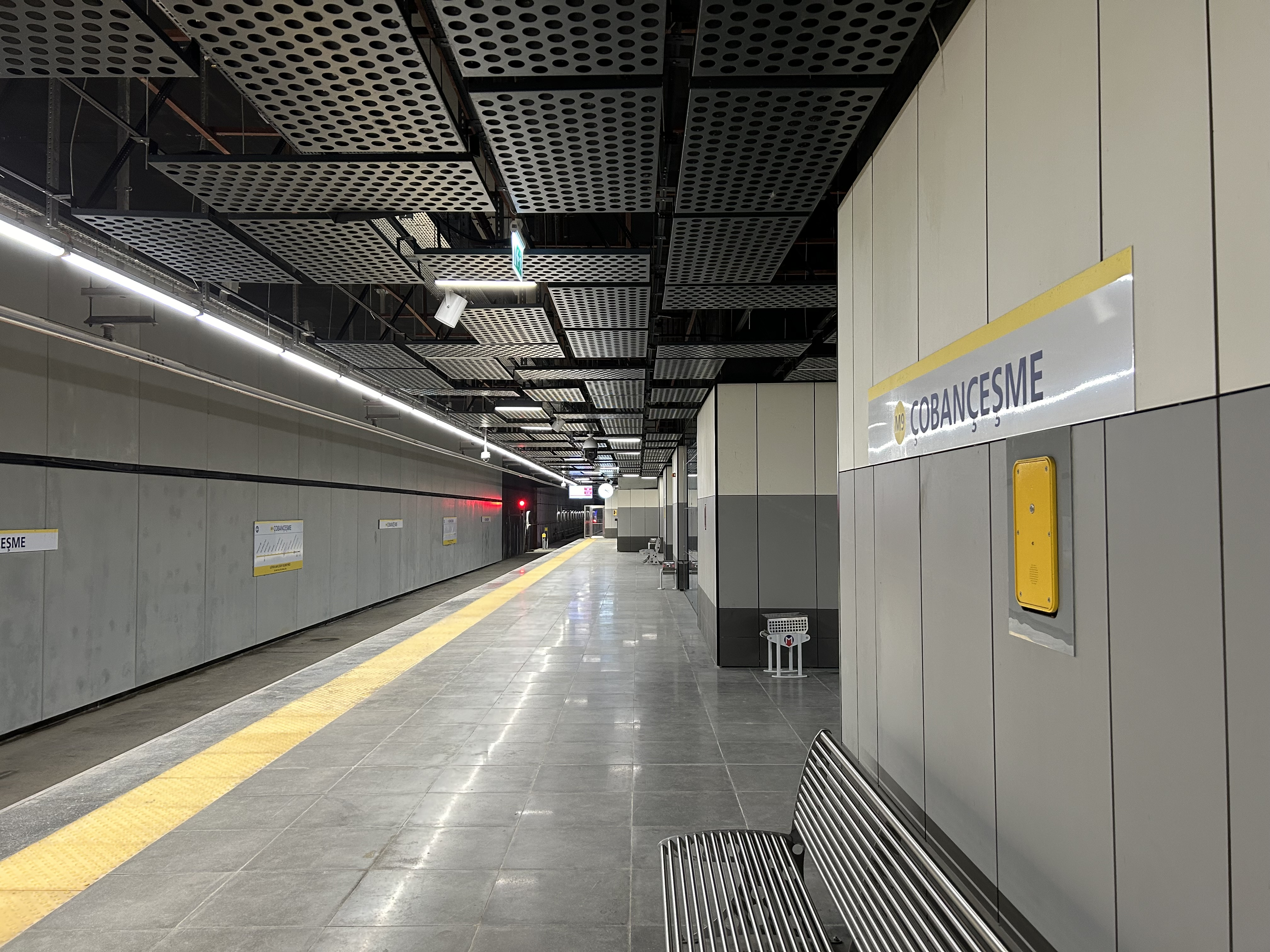
- Platform

General information
- Location: Yenibosna Central Neighborhood, Sanayi Street, 34196; Bahçelievler, Istanbul; Turkey
- Coordinates: 40°59′58″N 28°49′22″E
- System: Istanbul Metro rapid transit station
- Owner: Istanbul Metropolitan Municipality
- Operator: Istanbul Metro
- Line: M9
- Platforms: 1 Island platform
- Tracks: 2
- Connections: İETT Bus: 31, 31E, 31K, 36AY, 73Y, 76V, 78B, 79F, 79FY, 79G, 79K, 79Ş, 82, 82S, 89M, 89YB, 98B, 98H, 98MB, 98T, E-57,HT10, HT11; Istanbul Minibus: Küçükçekmece – Tevfik Bey Mahallesi

Construction
- Structure type: Underground
- Parking: No
- Cycle facilities: Yes
- Accessible: Yes

History
- Opened: 18 March 2024 (2 years ago)
- Electrified: 1,500 V DC Overhead line

Services
Preceding station	Istanbul Metro	Following station
29 Ekim Cumhuriyet towards Olimpiyat	M9 Line	Yenibosna towards Ataköy
Location

Çobançeşme is an underground station on the M9 line of the Istanbul Metro. It is located under Sanayi Street in the Yenibosna Central neighborhood of Bahçelievler. It was opened on 18 March 2024, with the extension of M9 from Bahariye to Ataköy.

== Station layout ==
Platform level	Northbound	← toward Olimpiyat (29 Ekim Cumhuriyet)
Platform level	Island platform, doors will open on the left
Platform level	Southbound	toward Ataköy (Yenibosna) →

== Operation information ==
The line operates between 06:00 and 00:00 and train frequency is 9 minutes. The line has no night service.

== Gallery ==
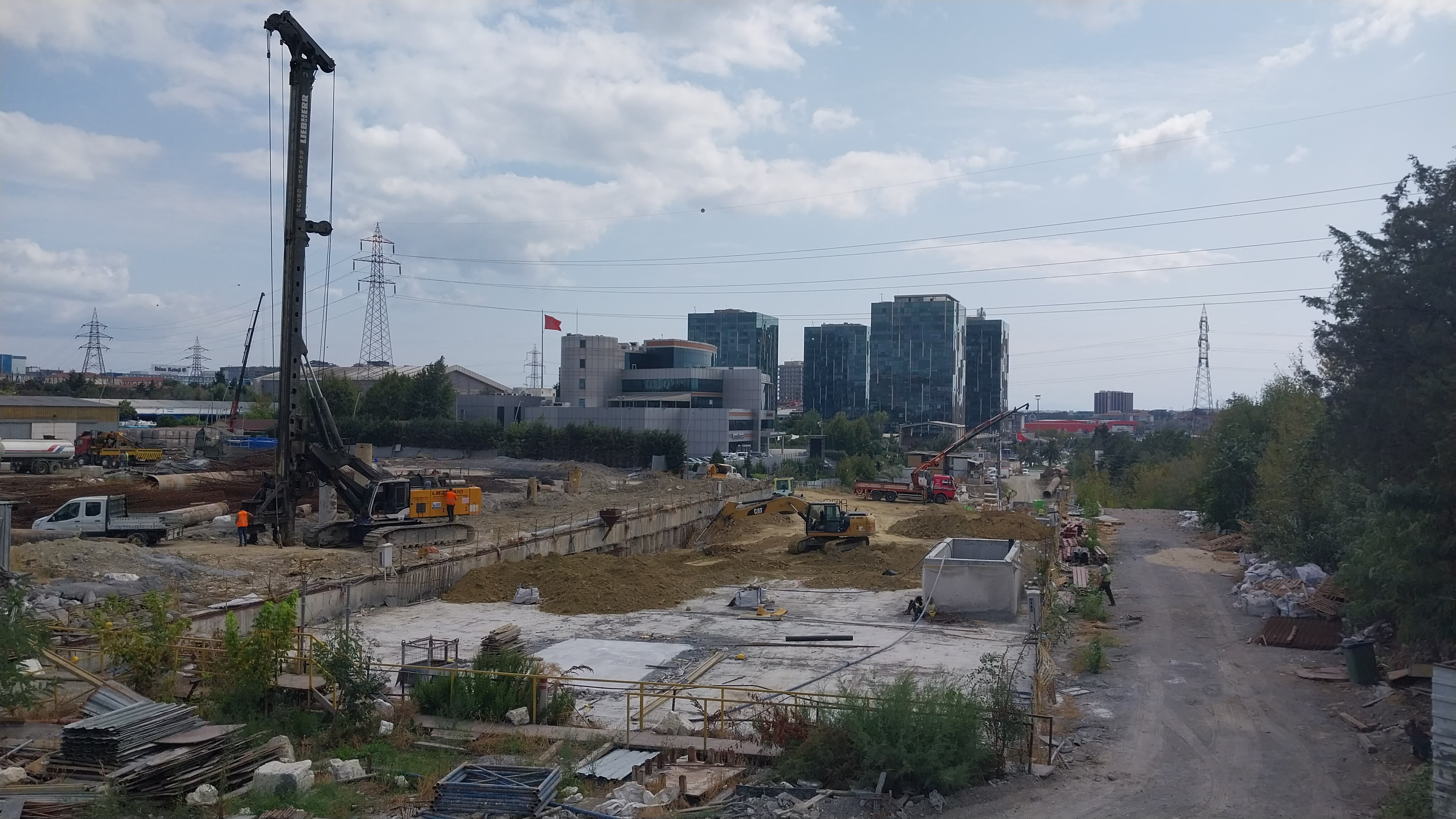
Construction site in September 2023

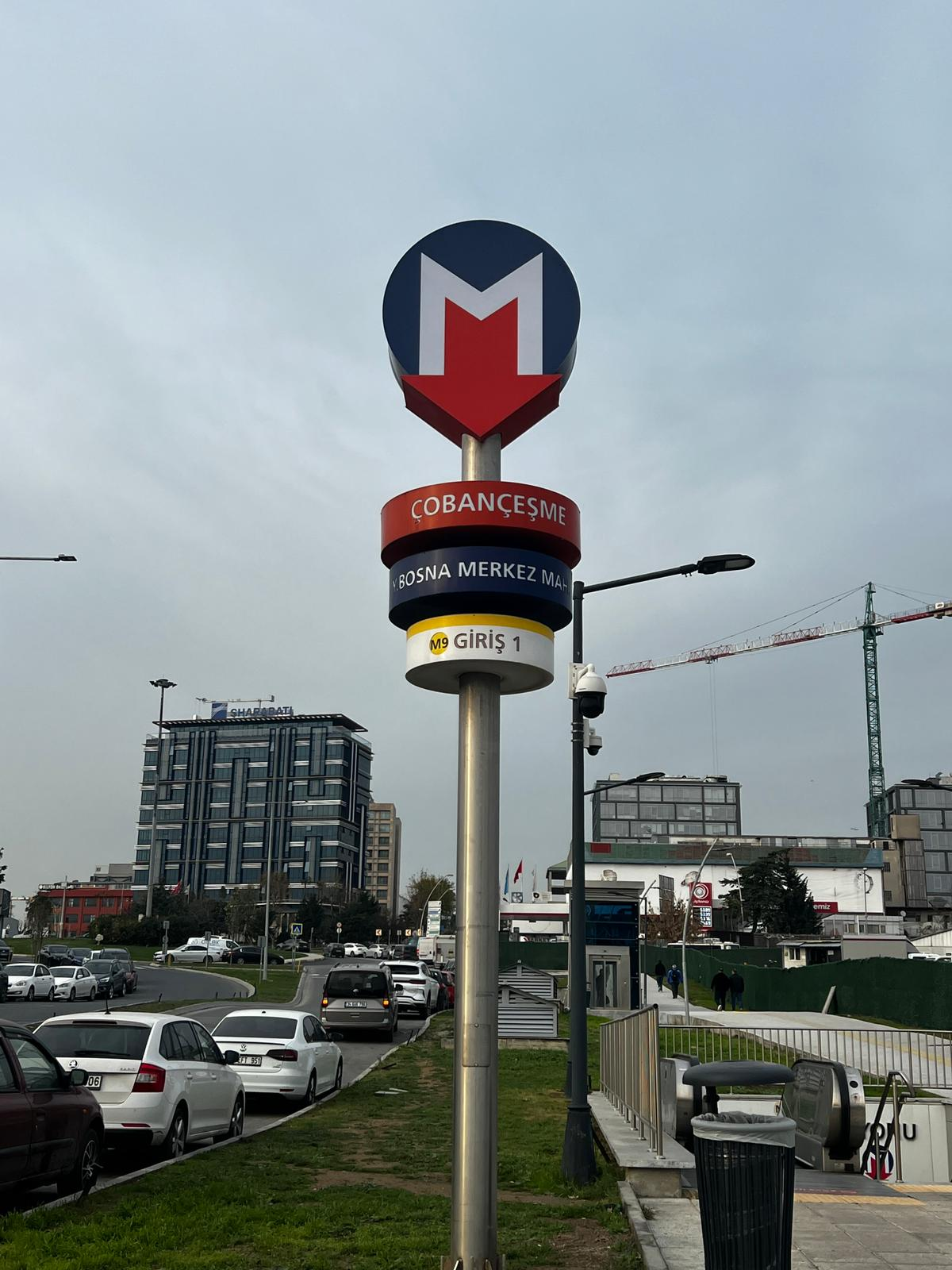
Totem pole

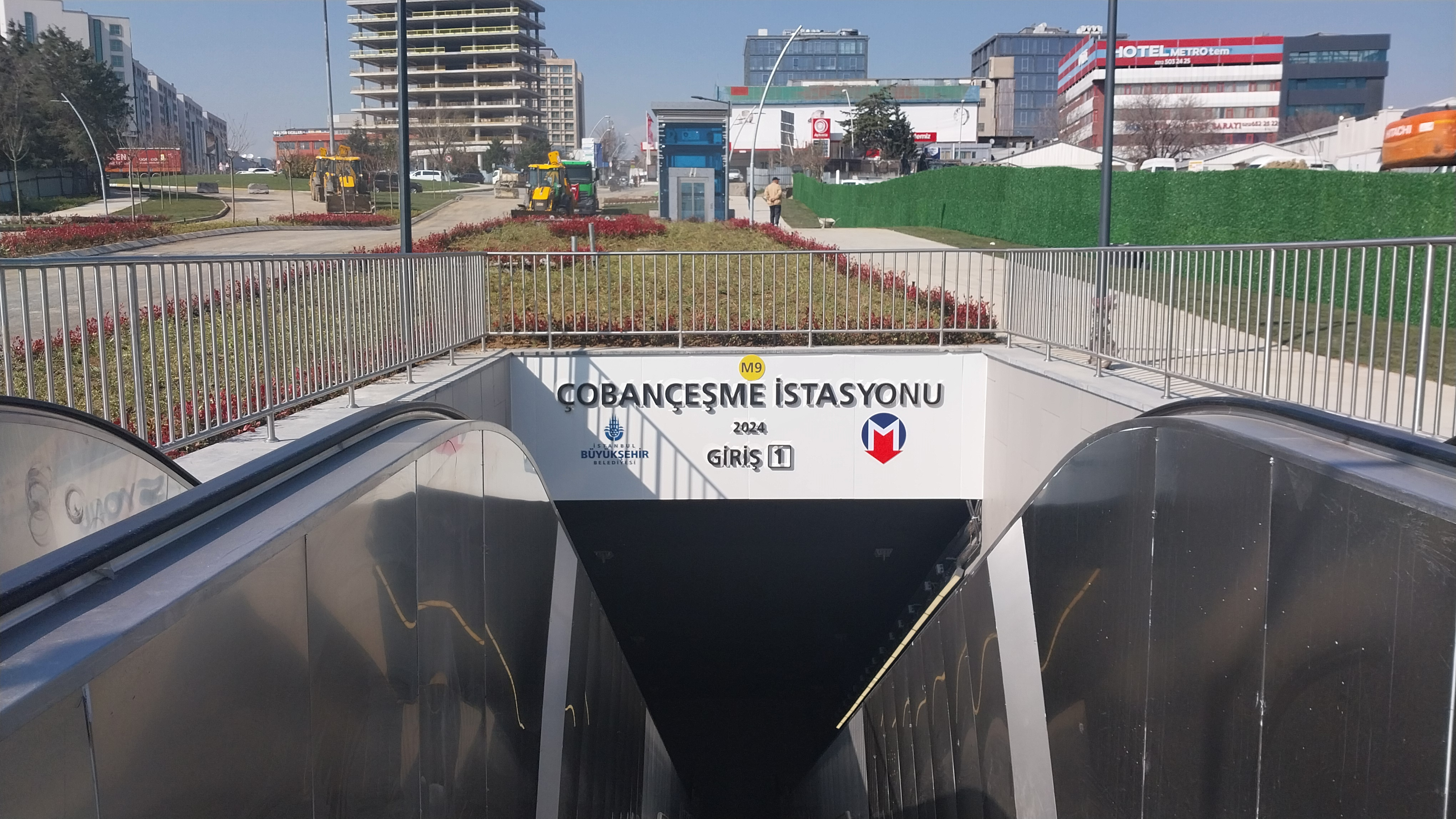
Entrance 1

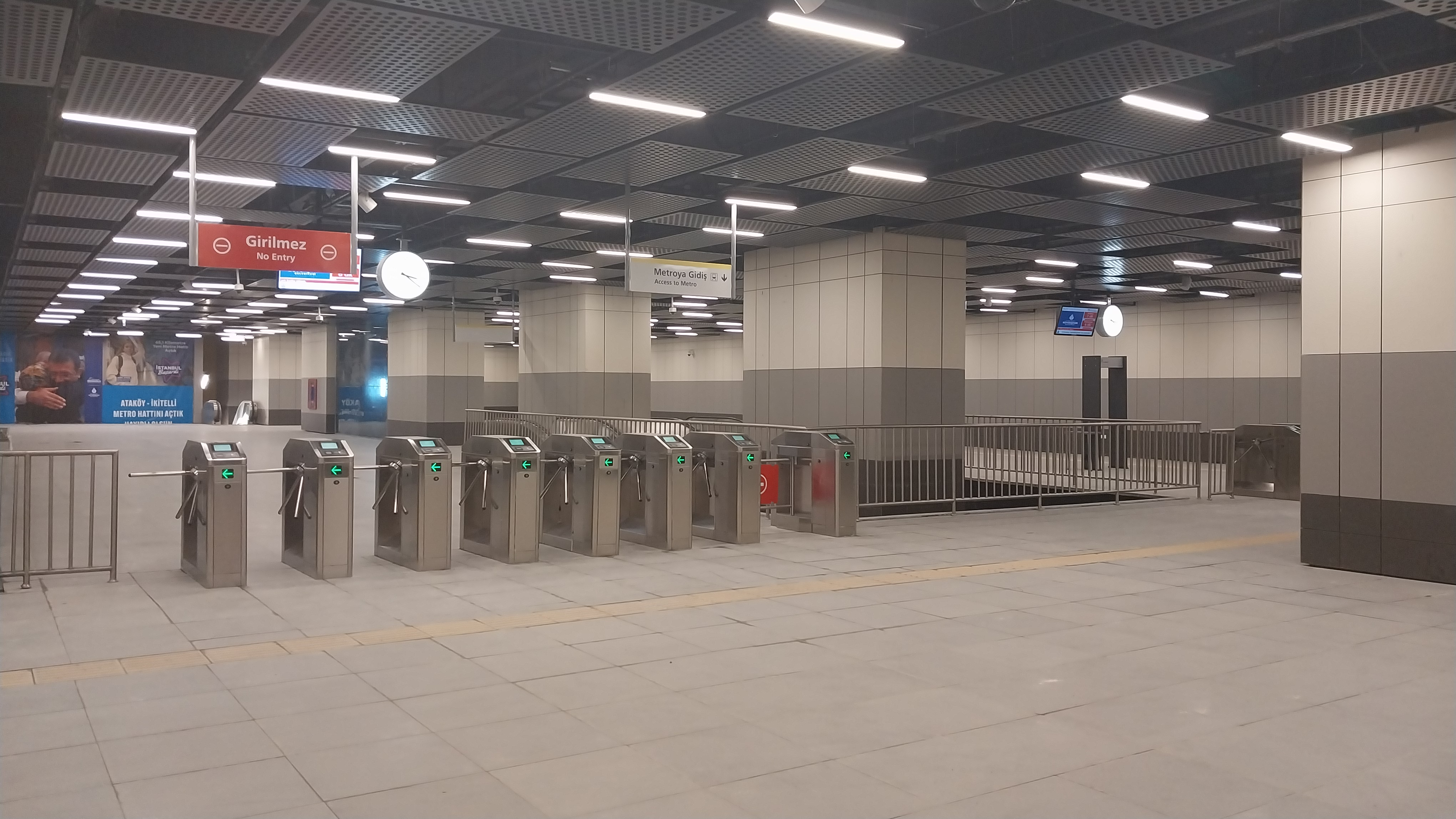
Ticket hall

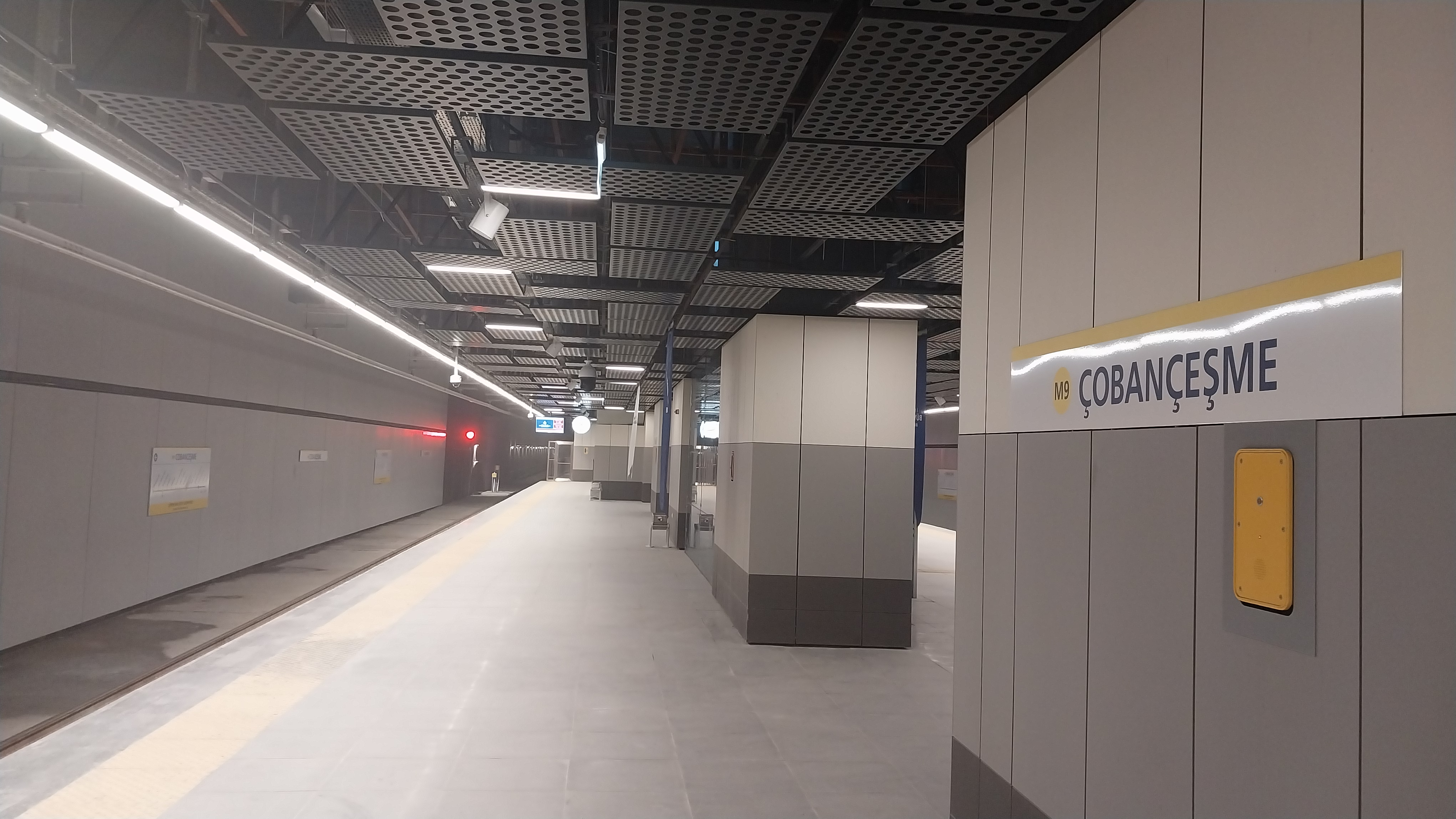
Platform
