= Doğu Sanayi station =

Station of the Istanbul Metro

Doğu Sanayi
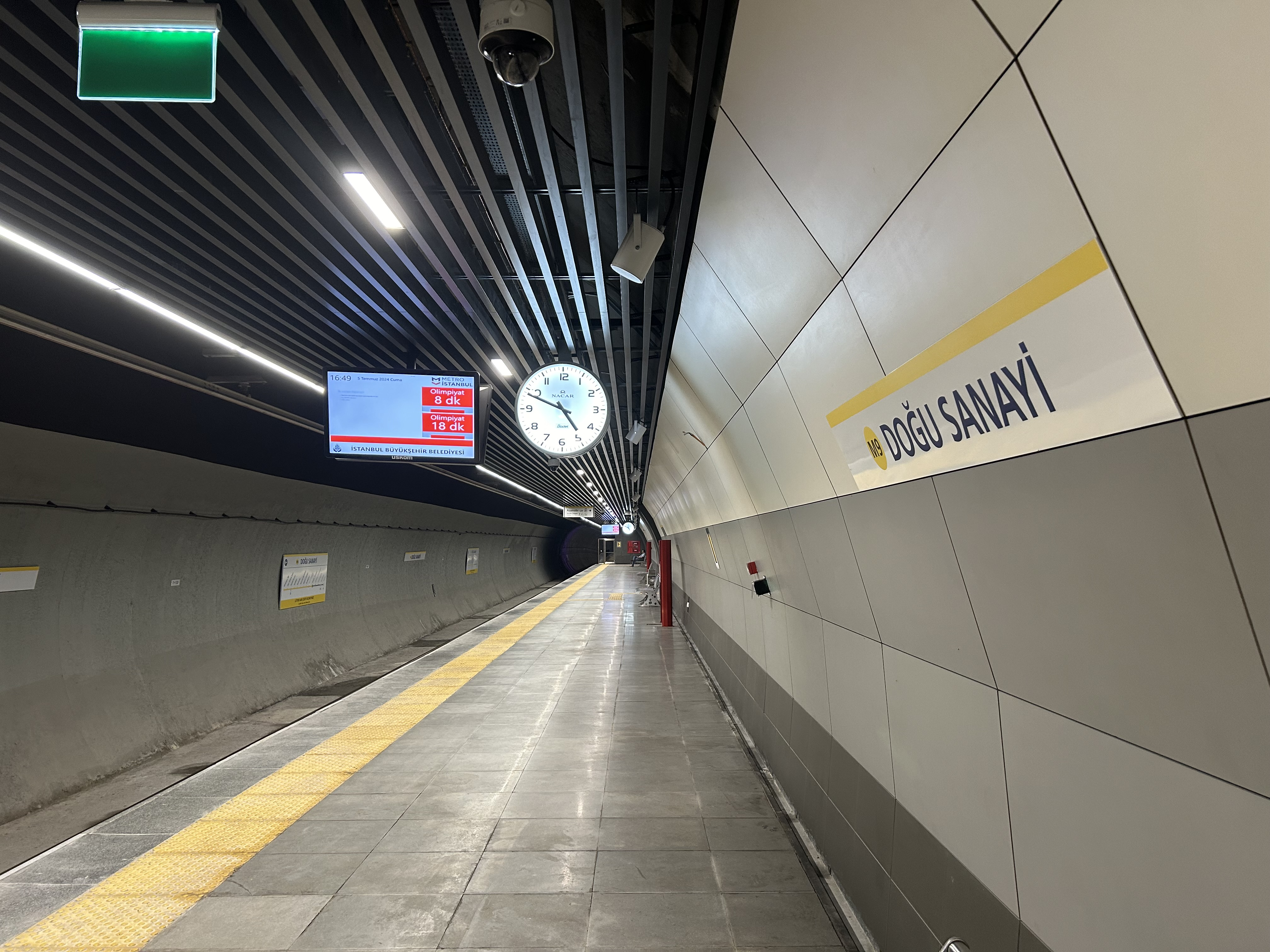
- Platform

General information
- Location: Yenibosna Central Neighborhood, 29 October Street, 34197; Bahçelievler, Istanbul; Turkey
- Coordinates: 41°0′54″N 28°49′4″E
- System: Istanbul Metro rapid transit station
- Owner: Istanbul Metropolitan Municipality
- Operator: Istanbul Metro
- Line: M9
- Platforms: 1 Island platform
- Tracks: 2
- Connections: İETT Bus: 31, 97KZ, 98E, HT12; Istanbul Minibus: Küçükçekmece – Tevfik Bey Mahallesi, Topkapı – Starcity

Construction
- Structure type: Underground
- Parking: No
- Cycle facilities: Yes
- Accessible: Yes

History
- Opened: 18 March 2024 (2 years ago)
- Electrified: 1,500 V DC Overhead line

Services
| Preceding station | Istanbul Metro | Following station |
|---|---|---|
| Mimar Sinan towards Olimpiyat | M9 Line | 29 Ekim Cumhuriyet towards Ataköy |
Location

Doğu Sanayi is an underground station on the M9 line of the Istanbul Metro. It is located under 29 October Street in the Yenibosna Central neighborhood of Bahçelievler. It was opened on 18 March 2024, with the extension of M9 from Bahariye to Ataköy.

== Station layout ==
| Platform level | Northbound | ← toward Olimpiyat (Mimar Sinan) |
| Platform level | Island platform, doors will open on the left |
| Platform level | Southbound | toward Ataköy (29 Ekim Cumhuriyet) → |

== Operation information ==
The line operates between 06:00 and 00:00 and train frequency is 9 minutes. The line has no night service.

== Gallery ==
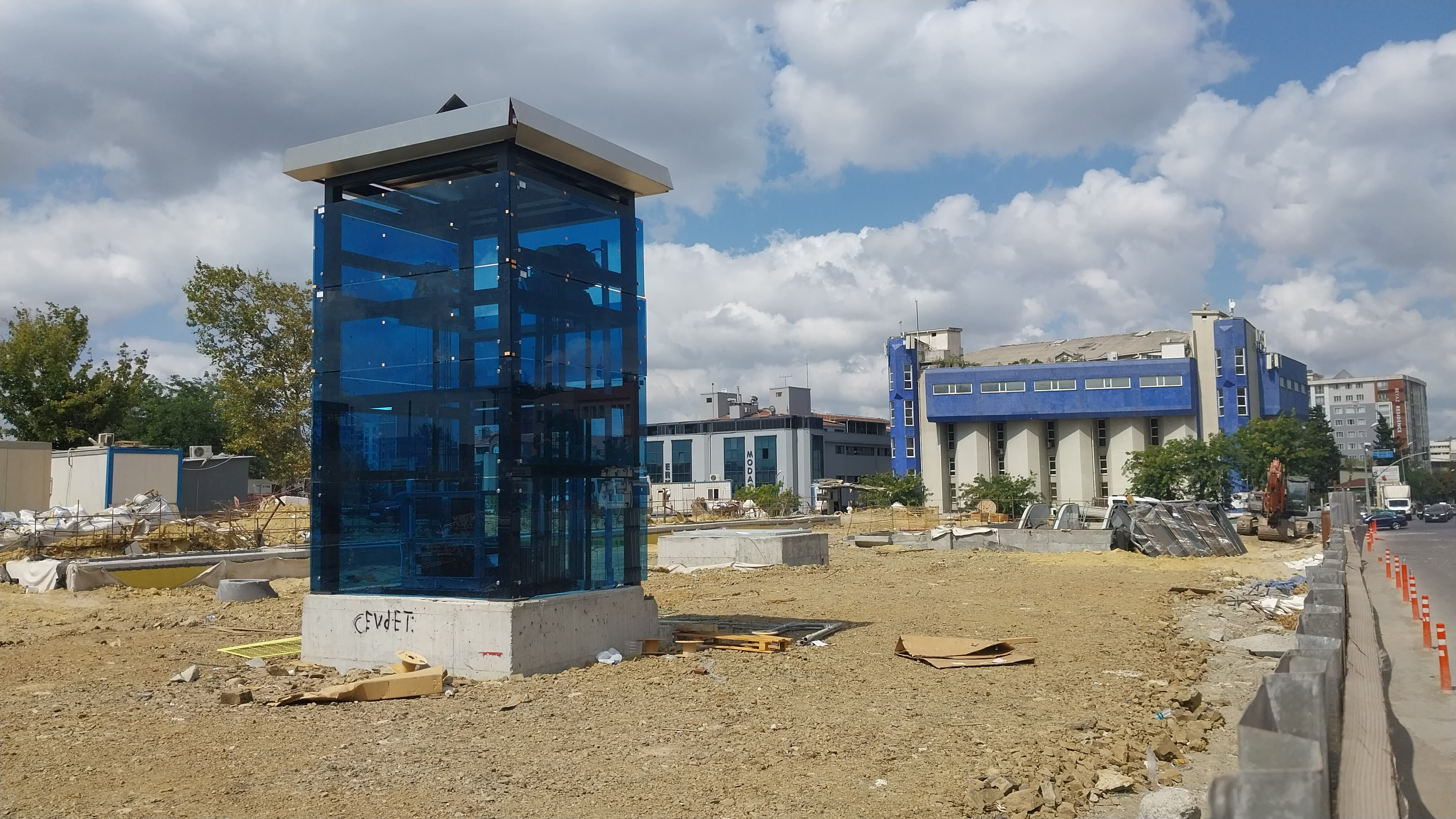
Construction site in September 2023

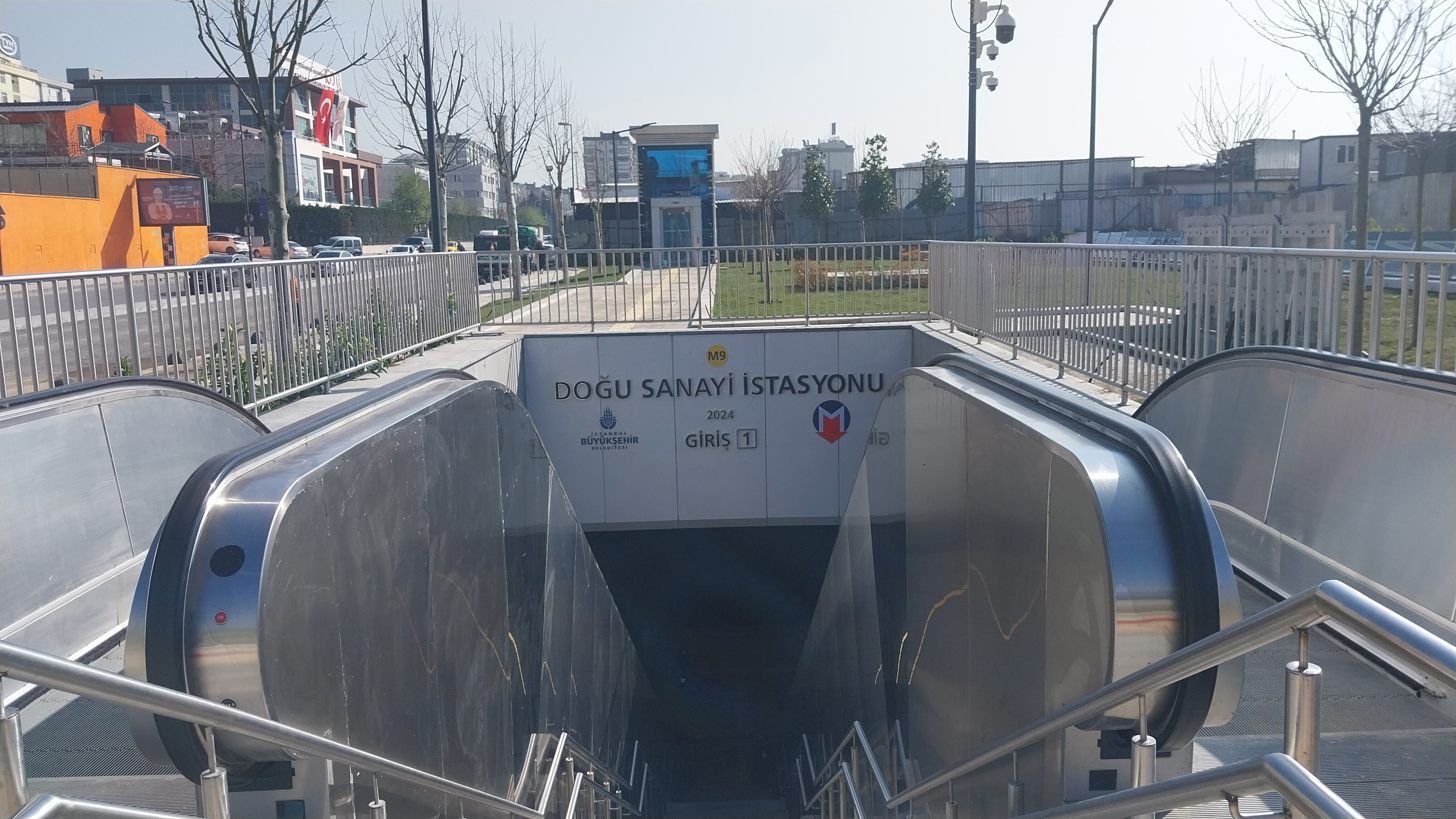
Entrance 1

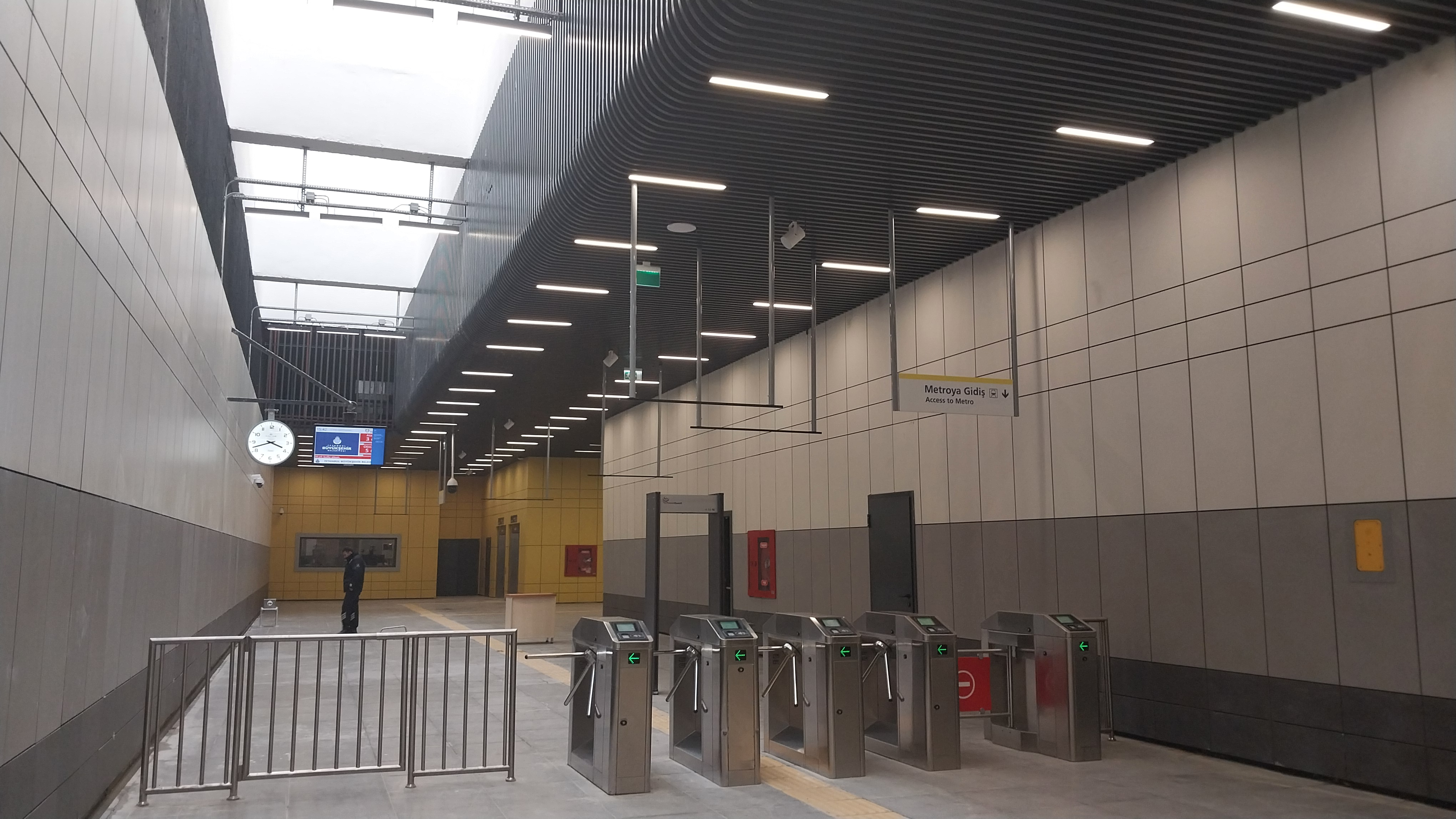
Ticket hall

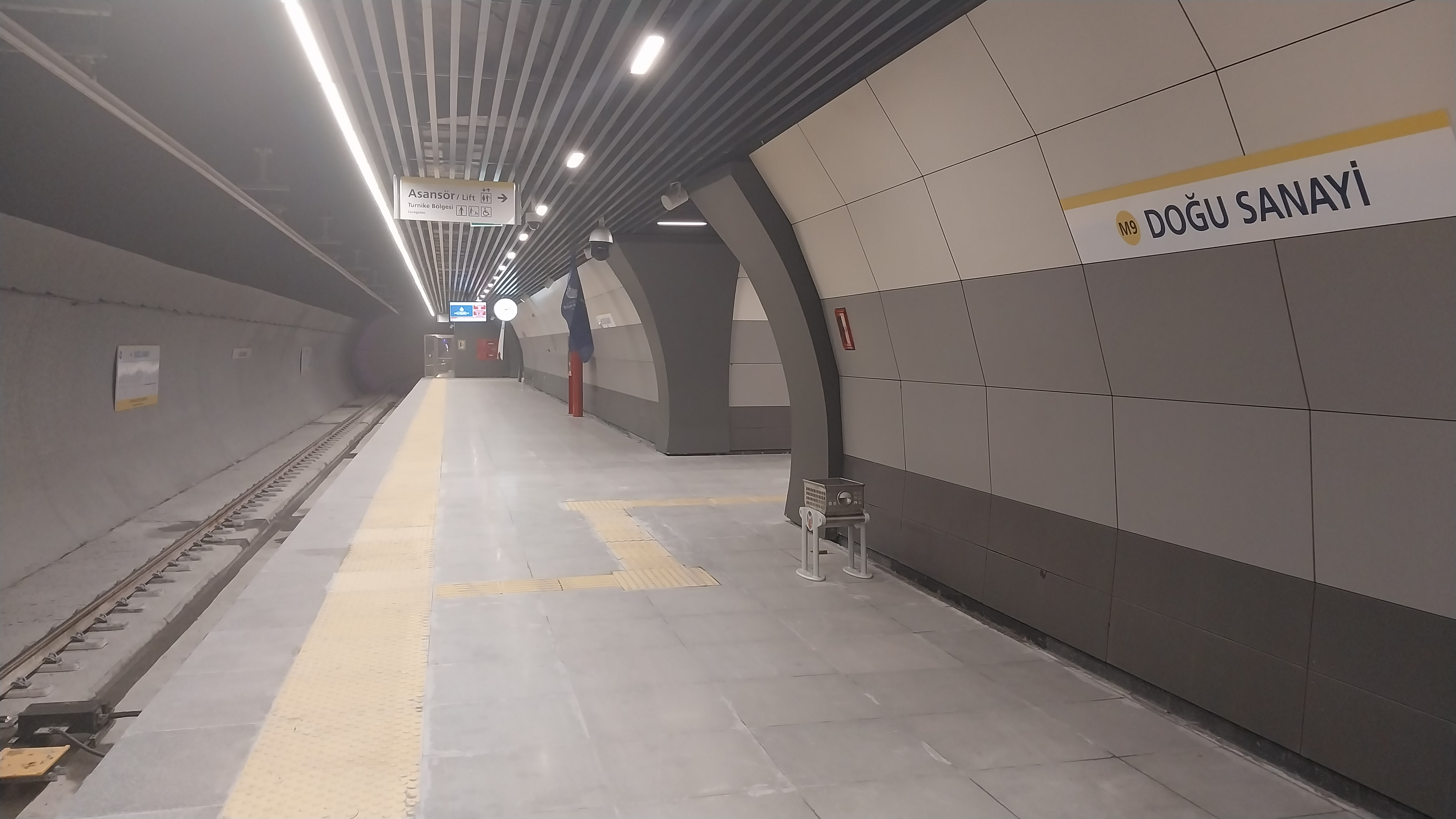
Platform
