= Halkalı Merkez =

Neighborhood in Küçükçekmece, Istanbul, Turkey

- Neighbourhood
- Location in Turkey Halkalı Merkez (Istanbul)
- Coordinates: 41°02′07″N 28°47′21″E
- Country: Turkey
- Province: Istanbul
- District: Küçükçekmece
- Population (2024): 80,115
- Time zone: UTC+3 (TRT)

Halkalı Merkez is a neighbourhood in the district of Küçükçekmece, located on the European side of Istanbul, Turkey. It is one of the most populous neighbourhoods in the district, with a population of 80,115 as of 2024.

== Transportation ==
Halkalı Merkez is served by the Halkalı-Üniversite railway station, and Basın Express (O7) road.

== Geography ==
The neighbourhood is located in the area known as Halkalı. The Halkalı square located within the neighbourhood. And Halkalı Merkez is Halkalı's center. (Merkez means Center in Turkish language) Atakent's neighbours are Atatürk, İstasyon, Atakent, İnönü and Yenibosna Merkez.
