= Mustafa Kemal, Ataşehir =

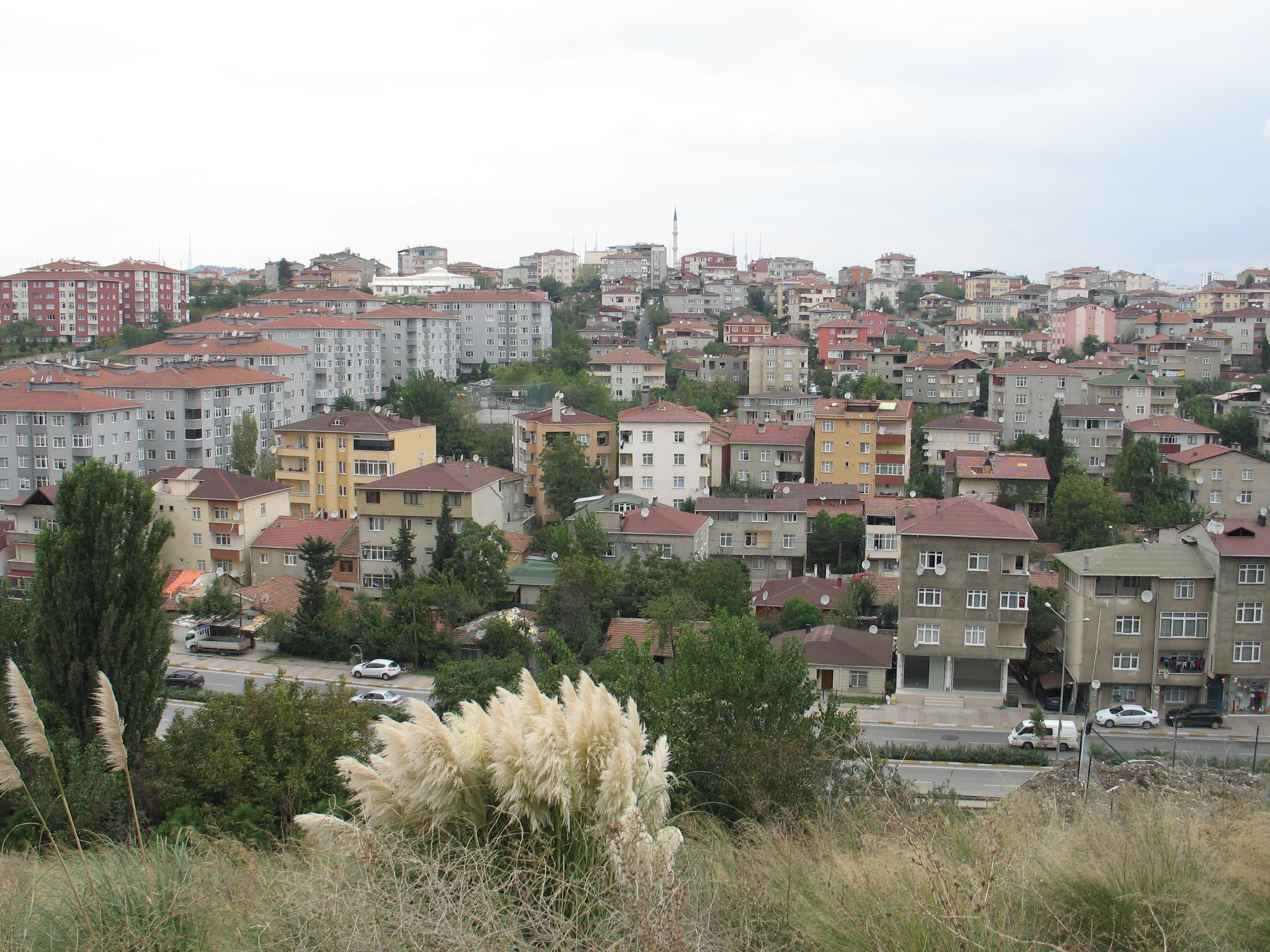
Mustafa Kemal neighborhood

Mustafa Kemal is a neighborhood in the district of Ataşehir, Istanbul, Turkey.

Its population is 14,262 (2022).

It is bordered on the northeast by the O-4 highway with the Ümraniye neighborhoods of Site and Finanskent on the other side of the highway; on the southeast by the Ataşehir neighborhoods of Barbaros and Yenisahra; and on the northwest by the Ataşehir neighborhoods of Örnek and Aşık Veysel.

== Name ==
The neighborhood was called 1 Mayıs (May 1) until the 1980 coup, after which it was renamed Mustafa Kemal, after Mustafa Kemal Atatürk.

== History ==
1 Mayıs was established in the mid-1970s as a socialist experiment in which urban workers built and organized their own neighborhood. Government security forces demolished the entire neighborhood on September 2, 1977, killing nine residents. However, the neighborhood was quickly rebuilt and eventually legalized. A gendarmerie station was established in the neighborhood in spring 1978. Four primary schools were installed for the 1978-79 school year. A government health station was opened in 1980. The area was officially recognized as a neighborhood (mahalle) called Mustafa Kemal a few months after the coup of September 12, 1980.

Mustafa Kemal was part of Ümraniye until the establishment of the Ataşehir district in 2008, at which time the parts of Mustafa Kemal south of the O-4 were transferred to Ataşehir.

== Features ==
The Mustafa Kemal neighborhood is home to

- a cemevi run by the Pir Sultan Abdal Kültür Derneği Ataşehir Şubesi (Pir Sultan Abdal Cultural Association Ataşehir Chapter)
- Deprem Parkı (Earthquake Park), also known as Deniz Gezmiş Park
