= Polygon (disambiguation) =

A polygon is a geometric figure.

Polygon may also refer to:

== Mathematics and computing ==
- Simple polygon, a single contiguous closed region, the more common usage of "polygon"
- Star polygon, a star-like polygon
- Polygon (computer graphics), a representation of a polygon in computer graphics

== Companies ==
- Polygon (blockchain), an Indian company
- Polygon Bikes, an Indonesian bike company
- Polygon Books, an imprint of Birlinn Limited
- Polygon Pictures, Japanese 3DCG anime studio
- Polygon Records, a 1950s record company

== Places ==
- A military training area is sometimes referred to as a "polygon" by speakers from Central and Eastern Europe when using English. This usage stems from a false friend of the word "polygon" in languages such as Polish, Ukrainian, and Russian, where it denotes a testing or training ground. The term likely derives from the French polygone and German Polygon, which acquired military connotations in the 19th and 20th centuries referring to Polygonal fort.
- Semipalatinsk Test Site, a nuclear test site near Semey, Kazakhstan is also known as "The Polygon"
- The Polygon, Southampton, a district in the city of Southampton
- Polygon Wood, Zonnebeke, Belgium, site of the Battle of Passchendaele in World War I

== Other uses ==
- Polygon (film) a 1977 Soviet animation film
- Polygon (website), a video game website
- POLYGON experiment, an experiment in physical oceanography which established the existence of mesoscale eddies
- Polygon Man, the former mascot for the Sony PlayStation in North America
- Polygon, a Danish magazine (pencil and paper) version of the strategy board game Hex
- Polygon, a chemical compound also known as sodium triphosphate
- Polygons, a type of patterned ground created by permafrost expanding and contracting

== See also ==
- Poligon Creative Centre
- Polygone, an electronic warfare tactics range between Germany and France
- The Polygon (disambiguation)
- Porygon
