= The Polygon =

The Polygon may refer to

- Semipalatinsk Test Site
- The Polygon, Southampton
- The Polygon Gallery

== See also ==
- Polygon (disambiguation)
