= Cemil Meriç, Ümraniye =

Cemil Meriç is a neighborhood in the district of Ümraniye, Istanbul, Turkey. Its population is 22,094 (2019).

Cemil Meriç is bordered on the north by State Road D016, with the Ümraniye neighborhood of Fatih Sultan Mehmet and the Çekmeköy Merkez neighborhood on the other side of the road; on the east by the Ümraniye neighborhoods of Parseller and Adem Yavuz; on the south by the Ümraniye neighborhoods of Yukarı Dudullu, Altınşehir, and Tepeüstü; and on the west by the Ümraniye neighborhood of Ihlamurkuyu.

The neighborhood is the namesake of Turkish writer Cemil Meriç.

The neighborhood is home to the Ümraniye Ihlamurkuyu Cemevi, one of the larger and older cemevis of Istanbul, run by the Anadolu Bilim Kültür ve Cem Vakfı (Anatolia Knowledge, Culture, and Cem Foundation), established in the 1990s, with the current building finished in 2004.

The neighborhood is also home to the Ihlamurkuyu Cemetery.
