= Halkalı =

Quarter in Istanbul, Marmara, Turkey

Halkalı Halkalı Semti
- Quarter
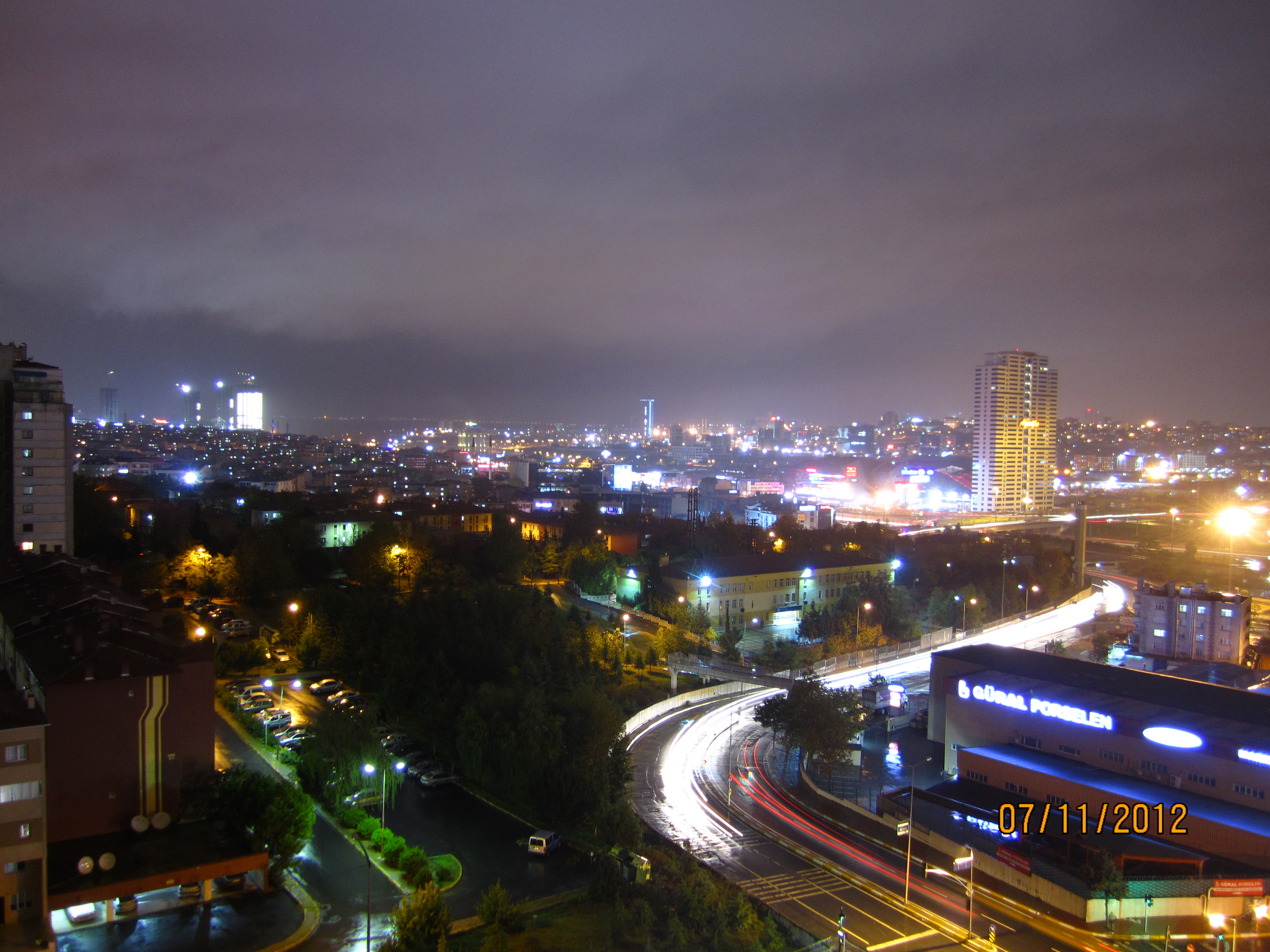

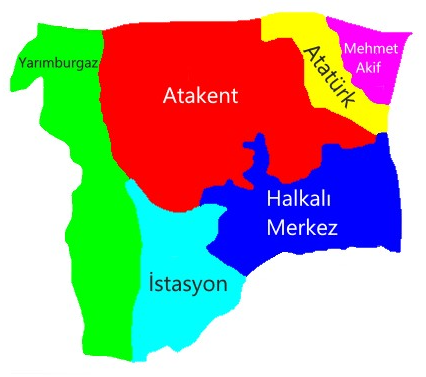
- Coordinates: 41°02′06″N 28°47′20″E
- Country: Turkey
- Region: Marmara
- Province: Istanbul
- District: Küçükçekmece

Area
  - Total: 2,392 km^{2} (924 sq mi)

Population (2024)
  - Total: 331,444
  - Density: 138.6/km^{2} (358.9/sq mi)
- Time zone: UTC+3 (TRT)
- Postal code: 34303, 34307
- Area code: 0212

Halkalı is a quarter located in the Küçükçekmece district of Istanbul, Turkey.

== History ==
The quarter used to consist of the villages Great Halkalı (Büyük Halkalı), Küçük Halkalı, and Yarımburgaz. The quarter, which received the title of municipality (belde) in 1976, had its municipal status ended in 1980.

Mayor	Term of office
Hasan ÖZTEKİN	1976-1980

== Location ==
Halkalı is located in the western and northern parts of the Küçükçekmece district. Its proximity to the TEM Motorway and railway lines makes it one of Istanbul's important transportation hubs.

== Transportation ==
Halkalı railway station, located in Halkalı, serves as the western terminus of the Marmaray line. It is also an important railway hub for long-distance passenger and freight transport.

== Settlement and development ==
Halkalı has undergone rapid development, particularly since the 2000s, driven by large-scale housing projects, shopping centres, educational institutions, and investments in transportation infrastructure. The construction of mass housing complexes and modern residential areas, particularly in the Atakent and İstasyon neighbourhoods, has contributed significantly to population growth in the area. Housing developments by TOKİ in Atakent and the Bizim Mahalle project developed by Emlak Konut have also emerged as new residential and lifestyle centres in Halkalı.

== Neighbourhoods ==
Neighbourhoods of Halkalı

The Halkalı quarter is composed of the following neighbourhoods:

- Atakent
- Atatürk
- İstasyon
- Halkalı Merkez
- Mehmet Akif
- Yarımburgaz

Although historically regarded as a neighbourhood belonging to Halkalı, Altınşehir has developed a quarter identity, particularly following the establishment of the Başakşehir district, the rapid urbanisation of the area, and changes in local naming conventions.

== Population and area ==
Halkalı is not an official administrative unit, but its total population can be estimated by adding together the populations of its neighborhoods.

Neighbourhood	Popolazione	Area
Atakent	103195	8.52
Atatürk	41529	1.6
Halkalı Merkez	80115	4.4
İstasyon	43148	3.1
Mehmet Akif	52374	1.1
Yarımburgaz	8759	5.2
Halkalı	331444	23.92
