= Poligon Creative Centre =

Creative centre in Slovenia

- Poligon kreativni center
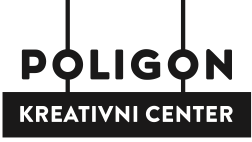
- Formation: February 17, 2014; 12 years ago
- Dissolved: December 1, 2019; 6 years ago
- Location(s): Tobačna ulica 5; 1000 Ljubljana; Slovenia
- Coordinates: 46.046722°N 14.485378°E
- Website: poligon.si

Poligon Creative Centre (Slovene: Poligon kreativni center, commonly known as Poligon) was a creative centre in Slovenia and the first and largest coworking space in Slovenia. It was a training ground for creative communities and self-employed operating in the field of creative economies, social entrepreneurship and culture in Ljubljana, Slovenia, and it was placed inside the former tobacco factory, Tobačna Ljubljana. The Slovenia Crowdfunding Initiative was based out of the center.

== History ==
Poligon was established in February 2014 by Slovenia Coworking (Luka Piškorič, Eva Perčič, Marko Orel) - national initiative for popularization of coworking in Slovenia with the help of supporting communities: Slovenia Crowdfunding, Kreativna cona Šiška, and Ljudje.si.

Poligon was created with the goal of promoting opportunities for self-employment of creative professionals in Ljubljana. Poligon offered a coworking space for its community, makerspace, a crowdfunding lab, a classroom, a bar, a library, a gallery space, and organised many social and cultural events. It was part of the international coworking exchange program in cooperation with coworking spaces across Europe.

Poligon was run by their three co-founders Piškorič, Orel, and Perčič (Matjaž).

Poligon ceased all of its operations 2019.

== Facilities ==
Poligon's space is 1200m^{2}. Besides offering a workspace, Poligon also holds workshops for self-employed entrepreneurs and makers, exhibitions as well as social events.

== Notable events ==
Since its founding, Poligon has had a positive impact on the creative sector in Slovenia.

In 2015, Poligon was featured as part of the Remote Year program.
