= Atatürk, Küçükçekmece =

Atatürk
- Neighbourhood
- Location in Turkey Atatürk (Istanbul)
- Coordinates: 41°03′02″N 28°47′51″E
- Country: Turkey
- Province: Istanbul
- District: Küçükçekmece
- Elevation: 50 m (160 ft)
- Population (2024): 41,529
- Time zone: UTC+3 (TRT)
- Postal code: 34307
- Area code: 0212

Atatürk is a neighbourhood in the Küçükçekmece district of Istanbul, Türkiye. As of 2022, it had a population of 41,529. The neighbourhood covers an area of 1.6 km².

== Geography ==
The neighbourhood is located in the area known as Halkalı. Marmara Sanayi Sitesi located within the neighbourhood. It is well developed in terms of industry. Atatürk's neighbours are Atakent, Halkalı Merkez, Mehmet Akif and Ziya Gökalp.
