= Ihlamurkuyu =

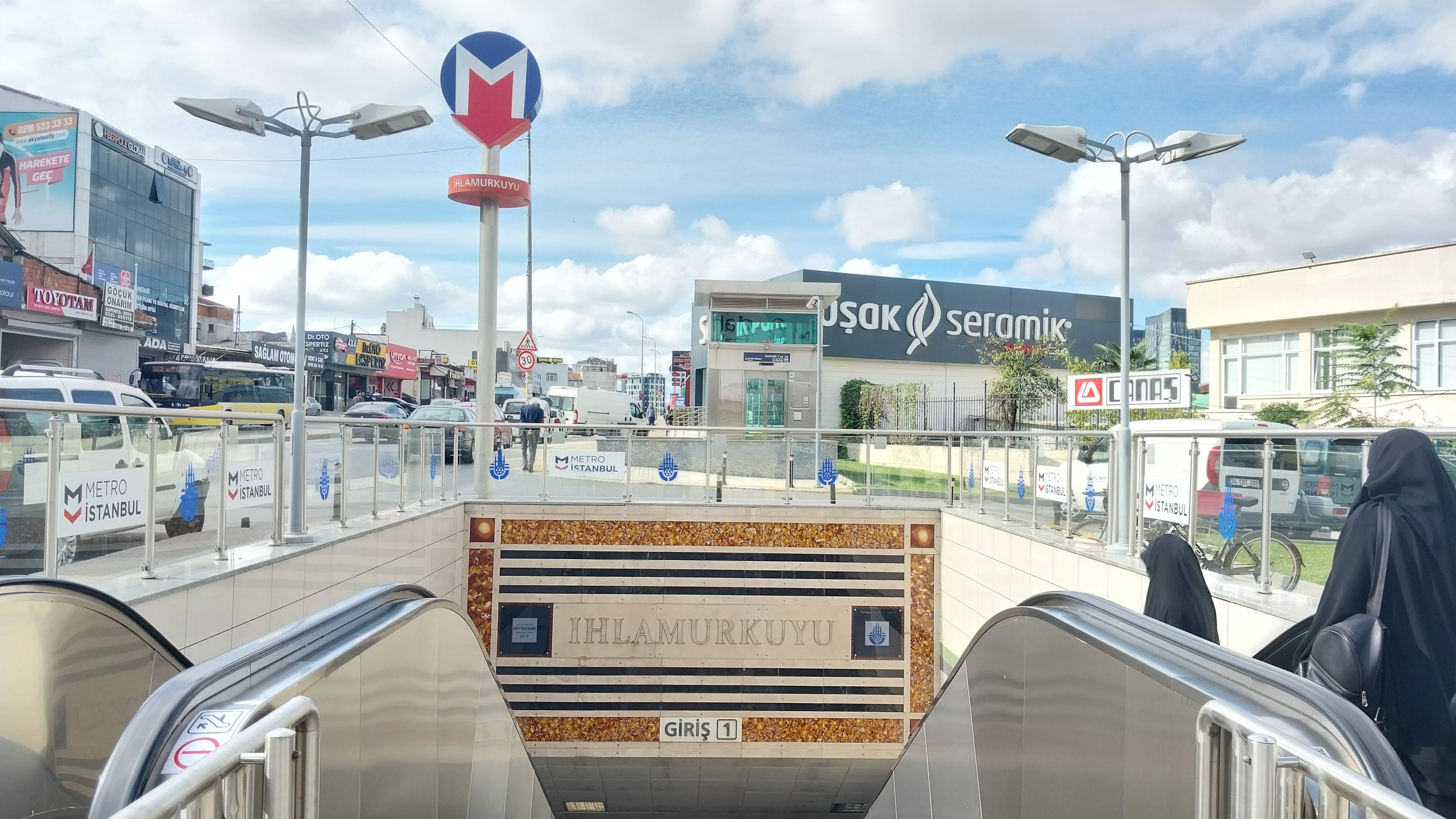
subway entrance, Ihlamurkuyu

Ihlamurkuyu is a neighborhood (mahalle) in the district of Ümraniye, Istanbul Province, Turkey. It is on the Anatolian side of Istanbul.

Its population is 16,308 (2019). Its land area is 137 hectares.

It is bordered on the east by the Ümraniye neighborhood of Cemil Meriç, on the southwest by the Ümraniye neighborhood of Tepeüstü, and on the northwest by State Road D.016 and the Ümraniye neighborhood of Fatih Sultan Mehmet.

Much of the northern part of the neighborhood is taken up by Trabzon Park. The Ihlamurkuyu Cemetery is outside the northern part of Ihlamurkuyu, in the Cemil Meriç neighborhood.

The name of the neighborhood means literally "linden well" (Turkish: ıhlamur + kuyu).

Large-scale industry began coming to Ümraniye in the 1950s, including eventually the neighborhood of Ihlamurkuyu.
