= Reşitpaşa =

- Neighbourhood
- Location in Turkey Reşitpaşa (Istanbul)
- Coordinates: 41.10687°N 29.04112°E
- Country: Turkey
- Province: Istanbul
- District: Sarıyer
- Time zone: UTC+3 (TRT)

Reşitpaşa is a neighbourhood of the municipality and district of Sarıyer, Istanbul Province, Turkey.
