= İstasyon =

Neighbourhood in Istanbul, Turkey

- Neighbourhood
- Location within Turkey Location within Istanbul
- Coordinates: 41°01′41″N 28°46′34″E
- Country: Turkey
- Province: Istanbul
- District: Küçükçekmece
- Elevation: 50 m (160 ft)
- Population (2024): 43,148
- Time zone: UTC+3 (TRT)
- Postal code: 34307
- Area code: 0212

İstasyon is a neighbourhood in the Küçükçekmece district of Istanbul, Türkiye. As of 2022, it had a population of 43,148. The neighbourhood covers an area of 3.1 km².

İstasyon's population has increased significantly, particularly with Emlak Konut's housing projects in Halkalı. The neighbourhood is notable for its planned residential areas and modern housing developments.

== Geography ==
The neighbourhood is located in the area known as Halkalı. The Halkalı Customs used to be located here. Halkalı railway station, some of the Halkalı mass housing projects, Mehmet Akif Ersoy Hospital, and Konut Birlik railway station are also located within the neighbourhood. İstasyon's neighbours are Halkalı Merkez, Söğütlüçeşme, Atakent, Yarımburgaz, and Kanarya.
