= Remote Year =

Work-from-home support company (defunct)

- Industry: Travel
- Founded: 2014
- Fate: Closed in December 2024
- Key people: Greg Caplan, co-founder and CEO, Sam Pessin, co-founder and COO
- Website: www.remoteyear.com

Remote Year was a company that facilitated travel and accommodations for people working or interested in working remotely. For $2,000–3,000 per month, Remote Year organized accommodation, workspaces, and professional and local activities to enable participants to travel while continuing to work and to foster a sense of community among participants. The program included trips across multiple cities and continents. Remote Year hosted employees from over 300 companies participating in its programs.

== History ==
Greg Caplan and Sam Pessin launched Remote Year in 2014, after finding it difficult to travel with friends whose work schedules did not allow them to travel freely.

Applications for the first Remote Year program opened in December 2014. Over 50,000 people signed up to be notified when the application went live. The company arranged travel between cities, housing, co-working spaces with Wi-Fi, and personal and professional group activities.

In October 2020, Selina, a Panama-based hospitality brand, acquired Remote Year for an undisclosed amount.

In December 2024, Remote Year announced its closure after nearly a decade of operation. The company, which had been acquired by Collective Hospitality earlier that year as part of the purchase of Selina, cited "circumstances beyond our control" for the shutdown.

== Legacy ==
Remote Year was a notable company in the digital nomad and remote work travel space. Its closure left a gap for remote workers seeking structured, community-driven travel programs.

Several other companies and organizations have since offered similar remote work travel experiences, including programs by Noma Collective, Hacker Paradise, and WiFi Tribe. These companies provide multi-week travel programs for digital nomads and location-independent professionals, continuing the type of experiences Remote Year had popularized.
