= Yenisahra =

- Neighbourhood
- Location in Turkey Yenisahra (Istanbul)
- Coordinates: 40°59′23″N 29°05′20″E
- Country: Turkey
- Province: Istanbul
- District: Ataşehir
- Population (2022): 9,968
- Time zone: UTC+3 (TRT)

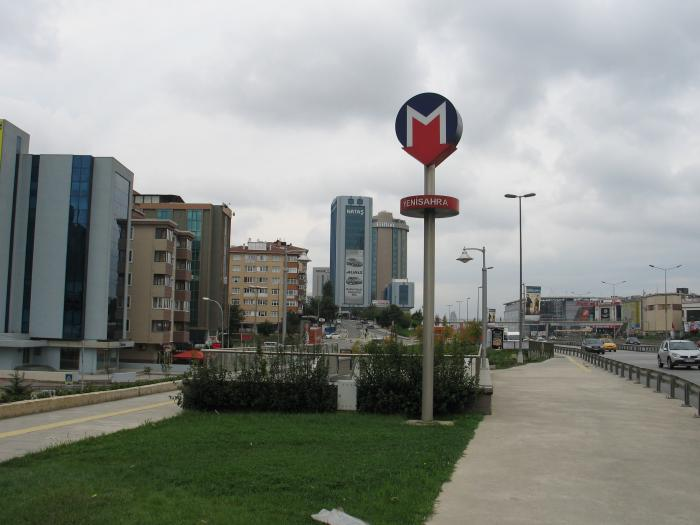
Yenisahra metro station located on the neighborhoods border with Kadıköy.

Yenisahra is a neighbourhood in the municipality and district of Ataşehir, Istanbul Province, Turkey. Its population is 9,968 (2022). It is situated on the Anatolian side of the city, on the border of the Kadıköy district. It became neighborhood in 1974, originally as a part of Kadıköy until it joined Ataşehir upon its creation as a district in 2008.
