= Ümraniye =

- District and municipality
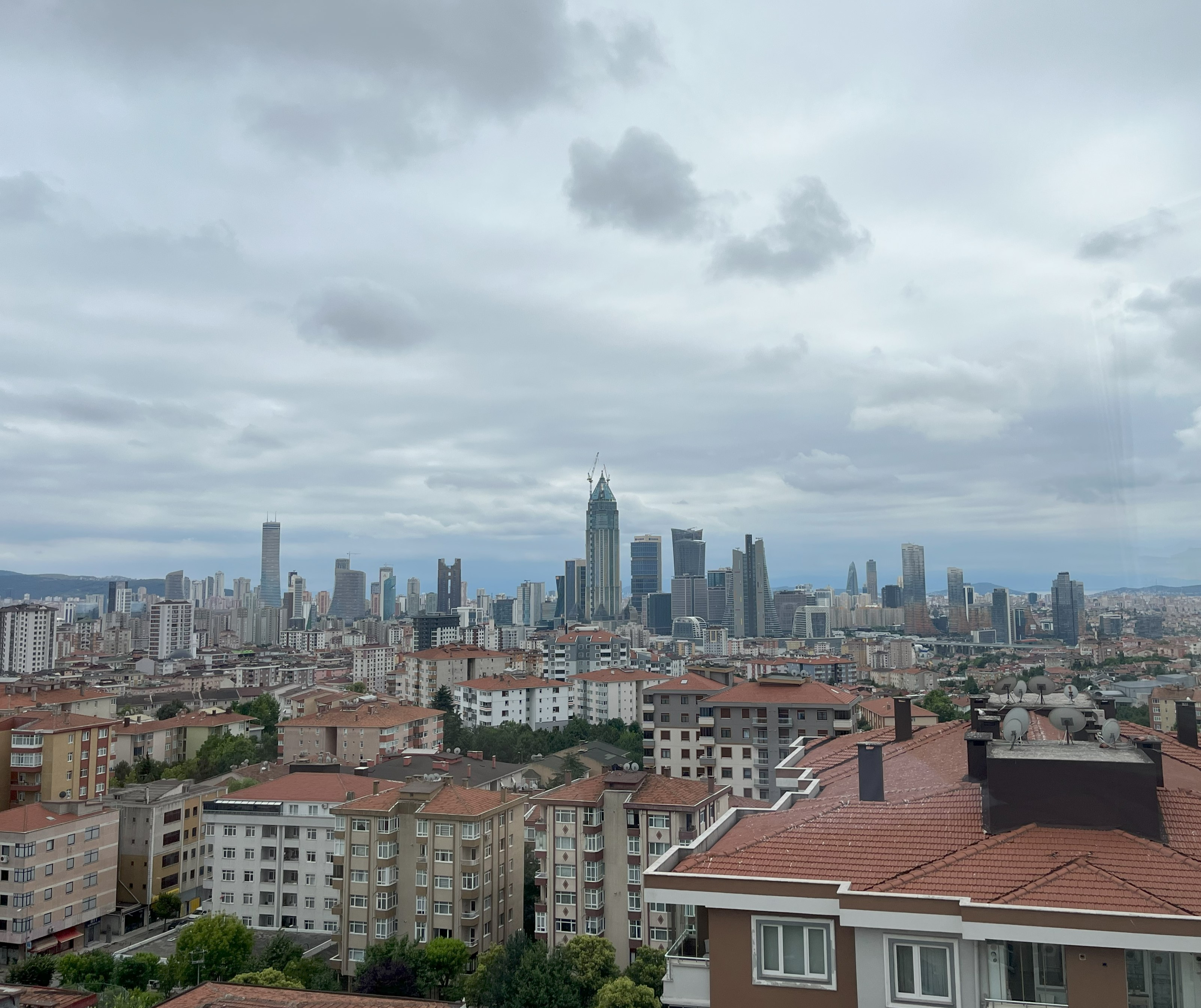
- A landscape of Ümraniye, Istanbul

- Logo

- Map showing Ümraniye District in Istanbul Province

- Location within Turkey Location within Istanbul
- Coordinates: 41°01′52″N 29°06′29″E
- Country: Turkey
- Province: Istanbul

Government
  - Mayor: İsmet Yıldırım (AKP)
- Area: 163 km^{2} (63 sq mi)
- Population (2023): 723,760
  - Density: 4,440/km^{2} (11,500/sq mi)
- Time zone: UTC+3 (TRT)
- Area code: 0216
- Website: www.umraniye.bel.tr

Ümraniye (pronounced [ymˈɾaːnije]) is a municipality and district of Istanbul Province, Turkey. Its area is 46 km^{2}, and its population is 723,760 (2023). It was separated from Üsküdar in 1987. It is bordered by Çekmeköy to the northeast, Sancaktepe to the east, Ataşehir to the south, Üsküdar to the west, and Beykoz to the northwest.

== History ==
Ümraniye is located on high ground just inland from Üsküdar. It was originally a small village of less than 900 inhabitants, mainly coming from the Black Sea Region in the 1950s. Its population grew far beyond its capacity during the 1970s and 1980s due to migration to the cities from rural areas of Anatolia. On 17 March 1978, 5 workers were massacred by Communist militants in the district.

The growth of Ümraniye was relatively better controlled than other districts that also attracted workers on the European side (such as Esenler or Gaziosmanpaşa); there are wider roads through the district, more space between the blocks, and relatively more green space. A large commercial district grew up to support this large population. The main road through the centre has public buildings, shops, shopping centres, and branches of many banks.

== Composition ==
There are 37 neighbourhoods in Ümraniye District:

- Adem Yavuz
- Altınşehir
- Armağanevler
- Aşağı Dudullu
- Atakent
- Atatürk
- Çakmak
- Çamlık
- Cemil Meriç
- Dumlupınar
- Elmalıkent
- Esenevler
- Esenkent
- Esenşehir
- Fatih Sultan Mehmet
- Finanskent
- Hekimbaşı
- Huzur
- Ihlamurkuyu
- İnkılap
- İstiklal
- Kazım Karabekir
- Madenler
- Mehmet Akif
- Namık Kemal
- Necip Fazıl
- Parseller
- Saray
- Şerifali
- Site
- Tantavi
- Tatlısu
- Tepeüstü
- Topağacı
- Yamanevler
- Yenişehir
- Yukarı Dudullu

== Ümraniye today ==
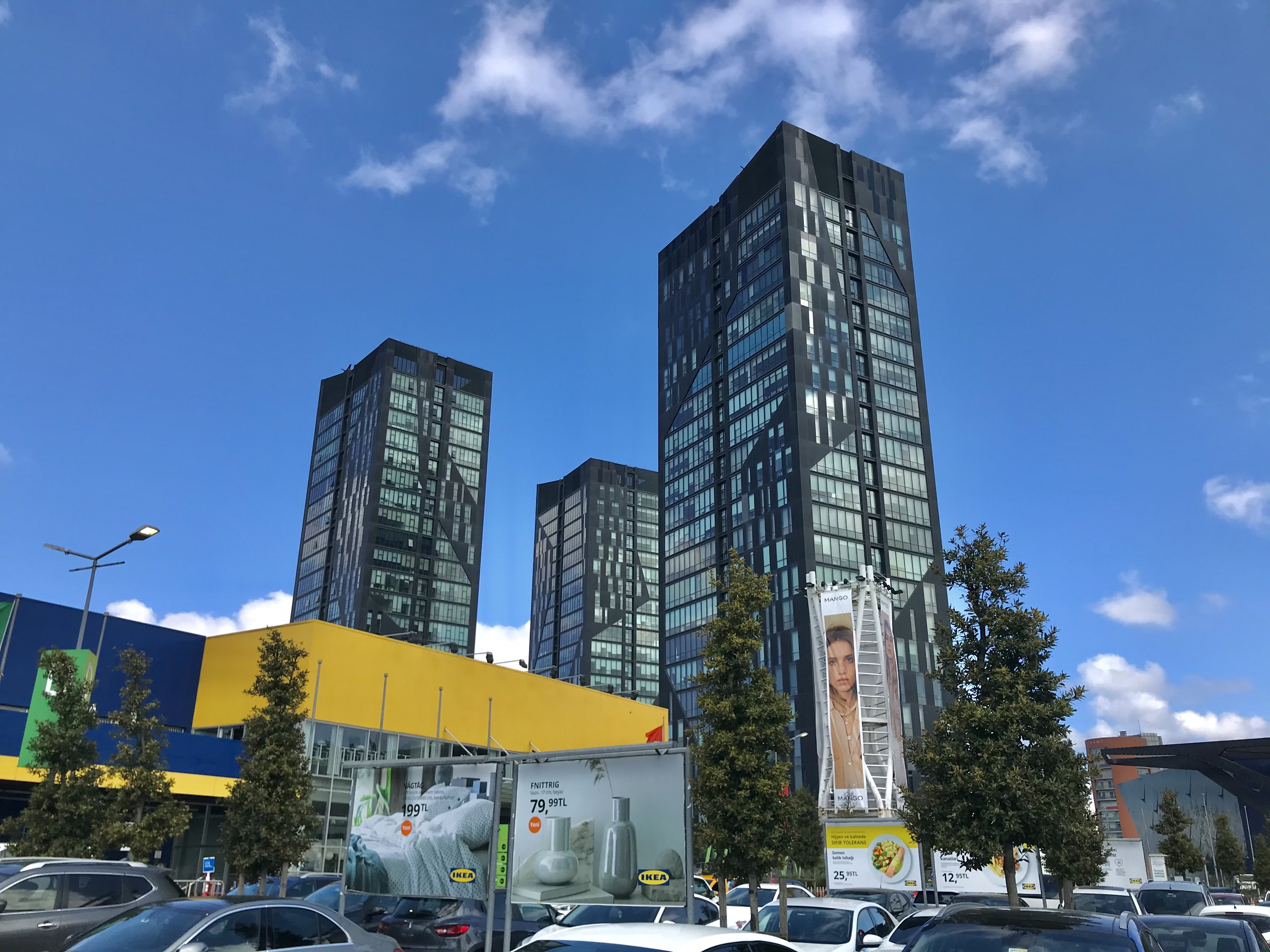
Buyaka Office Buildings in Ümraniye

In the last few decades, Ümraniye has built a lively shopping and business district. Recent building projects include the construction of large shopping malls (including Istanbul's first branch of IKEA), and modern apartment complexes have made parts of Ümraniye attractive places buying real estate, as Ümraniye is on a main highway that leads to one of the two bridges linking the Asian and European sides of Istanbul.

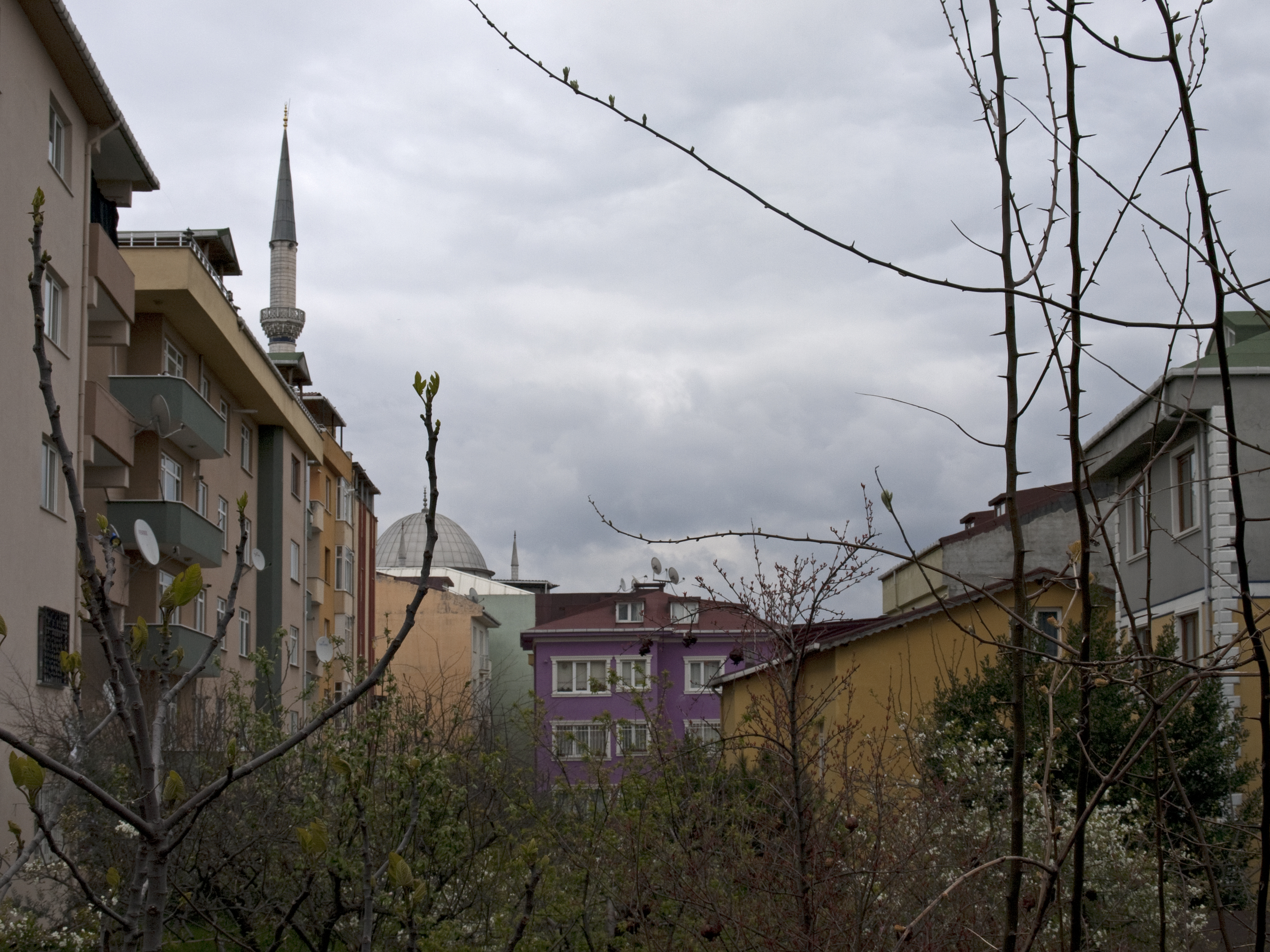
View of Ümraniye from Kirişhane Cd. On the left, the minaret and the dome of the Hazreti Ömer Mosque

== Sports ==
The women's football club Dudullu Spor was promoted to the Women's First League for the 2020-21 League season.

The Süper Lig club Ümraniyespor is located in Ümraniye. The club plays their matches in the Ümraniye Belediyesi Şehir Stadium.

The club Ümraniyespor got promoted to the first division of football, Süper Lig in the 2021–22 Süper Lig season only to get relegated the next season.

== Politics ==
Ümraniye has seen its fair share of political violence between left and right-wingers over the years, and during the 70s and 80s, law enforcement was problematic in parts of the area. In this way, it was considered the Asian side's equivalent of Gaziosmanpaşa on the European side. This violence was concentrated in a small quarter of Ümraniye, a vast district. In recent times, however, Ümraniye has been relatively calm. The people of Ümraniye usually vote in large numbers for conservative parties. The AK Party does well in this district.

== Places of importance ==
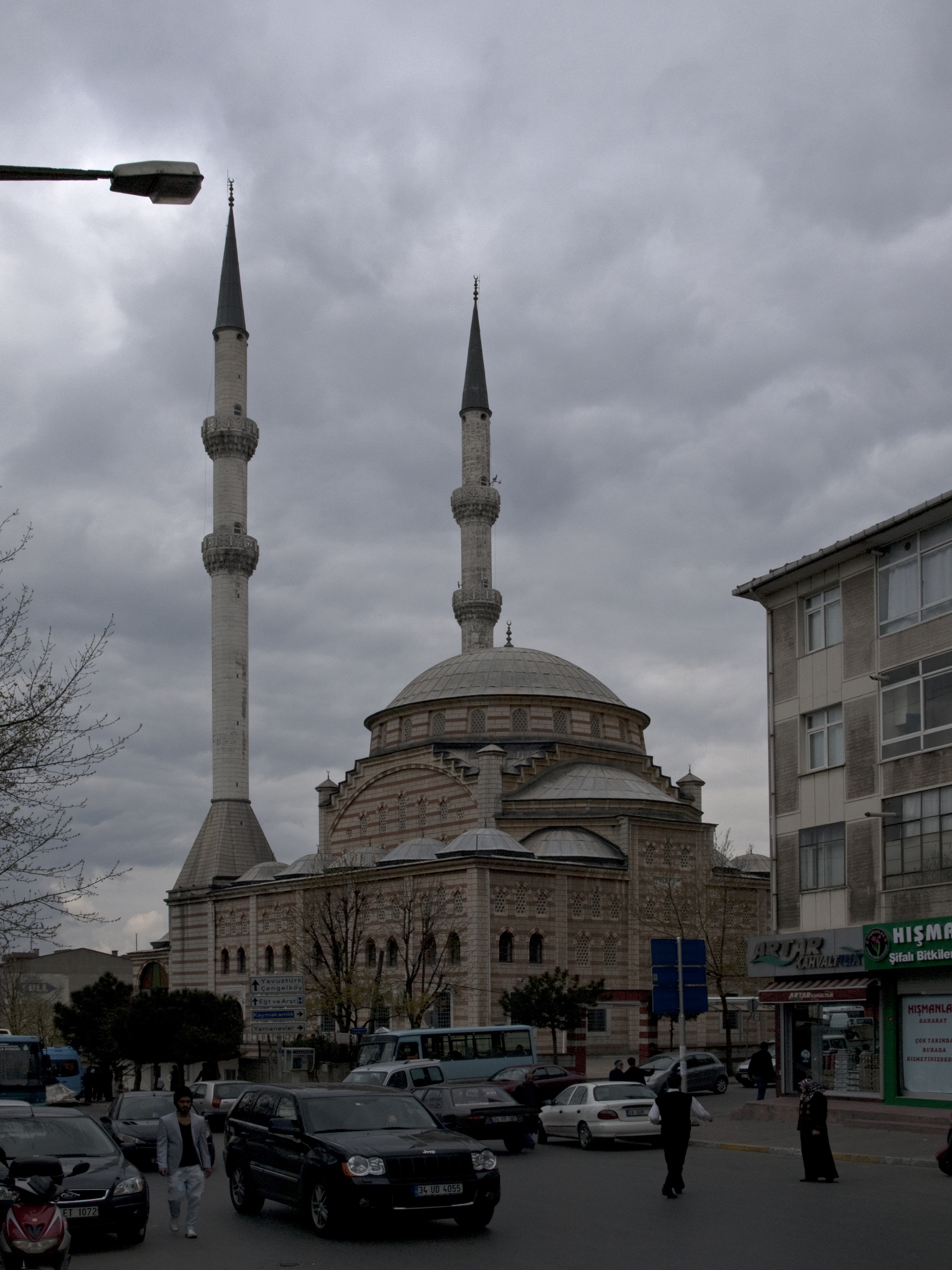
Ümraniye Central Mosque

In between Üsküdar and Ümraniye, there is a 'çilehane' of the Sufi saint Aziz Mahmud Hudayi. A çilehane (lit. 'house of despair') was where Sufis would go to pray in seclusion.

The Haldun Alagaş Sports Hall is located here, which is named after the karateka Haldun Alagaş. The venue hosts both national and international basketball, volleyball, handball games, and martial arts competitions.

Due to its elevated altitude, the full scene of Istanbul, including the Bosphorus and the European Side, can be seen from Ümraniye.

== International relations ==
Ümraniye is twinned with:

- Şahinbey - Gaziantep, Turkey
- Altıeylül - Balıkesir, Turkey
- Susurluk - Balıkesir, Turkey
- Belen - Hatay, Turkey
- Mihalgazi - Eskişehir, Turkey
- Geyve - Sakarya, Turkey
- Of - Trabzon, Turkey
- Kelkit - Gümüşhane, Turkey
- Demirözü - Bayburt, Turkey
- Çayeli - Rize, Turkey
- Sarıcakaya - Eskişehir, Turkey
- Gümüşhane - Turkey
- Jabalia, Palestine
- Fojnica, Bosnia and Herzegovina
- Stari Grad, Bosnia and Herzegovina
- Dire Dawa - Ethiopia
