= Atakent, Küçükçekmece =

Atakent
- Neighbourhood
- Location within Turkey Location within Istanbul
- Coordinates: 41°03′19″N 28°46′55″E
- Country: Turkey
- Province: Istanbul
- District: Küçükçekmece
- Elevation: 50 m (160 ft)
- Population (2024): 105,519
- Time zone: UTC+3 (TRT)
- Postal code: 34307
- Area code: 0212

Atakent is a neighbourhood in the Küçükçekmece district of Istanbul, Türkiye. As of 2022, it had a population of 103,195, making Atakent the third-most populous neighbourhood in Istanbul by population. The neighbourhood covers an area of 8.52 km².

Atakent's population has increased significantly, particularly with TOKİ's housing projects in Halkalı. The neighbourhood is notable for its planned residential areas and modern housing developments.

== Geography ==
The neighbourhood is located in the area known as Halkalı. The Halkalı landfill used to be located here. Halkalı Stadium, some of the Halkalı mass housing projects, Kanuni Sultan Süleyman Training and Research Hospital, and several social facilities such as Menekşe are also located within the neighbourhood. Atakent's neighbours are Atatürk, İstasyon, Yarımburgaz, and Ziya Gökalp.

== History ==
=== 1990’s ===
TOKİ, (Toplu Konut İdaresi Başkanlığı) was formed in the 1980s to fight the problem of illegal buildings. Atakent, called Toplu Konut back then was created as one of the first satellite towns in Istanbul to fight that problem. The first settlement was the Police Quarters, built by Kataş Construction, major parts were demolished in the early 2000s for the construction of Avrupa Konutları Atakent 2 (apartment complex). The first part of this satellite town is called the Atakent phase 1 (Atakent 1. Etap). Construction was done bu companies like Sutek, Alarko and Kutlutaş. In the early-mid 1990's the phase 2 (2. Etap) was built (smallest of the three phases) and the third phase (3. Etap) was built during 1998–2000 by IC İçtaş Construction.Many preschools, elemantry, middle and high schools were also built as well

=== 2000’s ===
After the three phases were completed, private apartment complexes that became “landmarks” of the town were built. Soyak Olimpiakent was built in 2005 and is still the largest apartment complex in the area and was built by Soyak and TOKİ. Avrupa Konutları Atakent 1 was built in 2006, marking the start of Avrupa Konutları and Artaş’ apartments all over Istanbul. The last TOKİ's were built in 2007–2008 (Kardelen, Manolya etc.) and more apartment complexes were on the horizon.

=== 2010’s and 2020’s ===
In the start of this decade, Atakent became very busy. Istanbul Lounge and Lounge 2 were built along with Dumankaya, Istanbul Sarayları and Bosphorus City. Arenapark mall was also built in the early 2010s as well making the place more desirable. Tema Istanbul 1 was built in the mid-2010s, marking the start of the Tema Park project. Many schools were opened as well however empty plots of land became limited. Tema Istanbul 2 and Tema World mall opened in the early 2020s making the place even more desirable. Atakent Life was opened in 2025 and Sinpaş's Saklı Konut Konakları is still under construction as of 2026.
