= Tepeüstü =

- Neighbourhood
- Location in Turkey Tepeüstü (Istanbul)
- Coordinates: 41°1′3″N 29°8′3″E
- Country: Turkey
- Province: Istanbul
- District: Ümraniye
- Population (2024): 13,349
- Time zone: UTC+3 (TRT)

Tepeüstü is a neighborhood in the municipality and district of Ümraniye, Istanbul Province, Turkey. Its population is 13,700 (2022). Its land area is 42 hectares.

The name of the neighborhood means literally "hill top" (Turkish: tepe + üst).

Tepeüstü is bordered on northeast by Alemdağ Avenue and the Ümraniye neighborhoods of Ihlamurkuyu and Cemil Meriç; on the east by Doğanevler Avenue and the Ümraniye neighborhood of Altınşehir; on the southwest by Tavukçuyolu Avenue and the Ümraniye neighborhoods of Mehmet Akif and Çakmak; on the west by Kaşgarlı Mahmut Avenue and the Ümraniye neighborhood of Çakmak; and on its northwest corner by the Ümraniye neighborhood of Fatih Sultan Mehmet.

In the 1990s, the area of Tepeüstü began to be densely settled. Because of "cadastral inconsistencies," "expropriation problems," and "old, unhealthy buildings with earthquake risk," plans for urban renewal began in 1998 and continued to at least 2024.
