= RV MTA Oruç Reis =

History

Turkey
- Name: MTA Oruç Reis
- Namesake: Oruç Reis (c. 1474–1518), Ottoman beylerbey of the West Mediterranean
- Owner: General Directorate of Mineral Research and Exploration (MTA)
- Operator: Geophysical Directorate
- Ordered: April 24, 2012
- Builder: Istanbul Maritime Shipyard
- Launched: March 28, 2015
- Identification: IMO number: 9675470; MMSI number: 271044654; Callsign: TCA4398
- Status: Active as of 2018

General characteristics
- Class & type: Geophysical exploration ship
- Tonnage: 4,575 GT
- Displacement: 4,867 t
- Length: 87 m (285 ft 5 in)
- Beam: 23 m (75 ft 6 in)
- Draft: 6 m (19 ft 8 in)
- Depth: 87 m (285 ft 5 in)
- Installed power: 4 x 2,520 kW (3,380 hp) 12V diesel generators
- Speed: max. 17 knots (31 km/h; 20 mph)
- Crew: 27

RV MTA Oruç Reis is a Turkish research vessel owned by the General Directorate of Mineral Research and Exploration (MTA) in Ankara and operated by its division of Geophysical Directorate for subsea geophysical exploration in shallow waters.

== Characteristics ==
The building of MTA Oruç Reis was contracted by the MTA to Istanbul Maritime Shipyard in Tuzla, Istanbul on April 24, 2012. She was launched on March 28, 2015, and was named for Oruç Reis (c. 1474–1518), the Ottoman Beylerbeyi of the West Mediterranean. The vessel is 87 m (285 ft 5 in) long, has a beam of 23 m (75 ft 6 in), a depth of 8 m (26 ft 3 in) and a draft of 6 m (19 ft 8 in). Assessed at 4,575 GT and a displacement tonnage of 4,867 t, the vessel has a maximum speed of 17 knots (31 km/h; 20 mph). She is propelled by four 2,520 kW (3,380 hp) 12V diesel generators of Anglo Belgian Corporation (ABC). The number of the crew is 27 and the scientific staff aboard is 28.

Following the completion of tests and acceptance activities in April 2017, she will be commissioned to explore petroleum in the Mediterranean Sea. She is capable of performing geophysical survey and 3D sampling at the seabed in a depth up to 20,000 m (66,000 ft). The vessel features a remotely operated underwater vehicle (ROV), which can perform observations and sampling at a depth up to 1,500 m (4,900 ft). Additional equipment allows survey of ocean current and analysis of physical, chemical and biological properties with the help of a CTD device for conductivity, temperature and depth. The vessel features a 12 t-capacity helipad for a helicopter suitable for day/night landing and take off.

== Controversies ==
On August 13, 2020, Turkish President Recep Tayyip Erdoğan announced that any attack on Oruç Reis will incur a "high price" and suggested that Turkey had already acted on that warning. This comes after unconfirmed reports that the Hellenic Navy frigate Limnos collided with one of the ships of the Turkish Navy that were escorting Oruç Reis, which resumed drilling operations near Kastellorizo on August 10 after suspending its work in July.

== See also ==
- RV MTA Selen
- RV MTA Sismik 1
- RV MTA Turkuaz
- List of research vessels of Turkey
