= TCG Akdeniz =

TCG Akdeniz is the name of the following ships of the Turkish Navy:

- TCG Akdeniz (F 257), ex-USS Bowen, a Knox-class frigate acquired in 1994 and decommissioned in 2011
- TCG Akdeniz (F 519), a Istanbul-class frigate launched in 2026

== See also ==
- Akdeniz (disambiguation)
