= Toponyms of Turkey =

The toponyms of Turkey result from the legacy left by several linguistic heritages: the Turkish language (spoken as first language by the majority of the population), the Greek language, the Armenian language, the Kurdish language, the Laz language as well as several other languages once spoken widely in Turkey. Turkey's place names range from those of unknown or unrecognizable origins to more clearly derivable onomastics. Many places have had their names changed throughout history as new language groups dominated the landbridge that present day Turkey is. A systematic turkification of place names was carried out when the worldwide wave of nationalism reached Turkey during the 20th century (See also: Place name changes in Turkey).

== Toponyms of population centers in Turkey ==
- Adana: from the Hittite ^{URU}Adaniya of Kizzuwatna, alternatives: related to the legendary character Danaus, Greek tribe Danaoi, Egyptian enemy country Danaja, Mycenaean refugees Dananayim or Danuna, and Da-na-vo (people living by the river), Scythian nomad people.
- Adıyaman: As the official Ottoman Turkish name Hısn-ı Mansur ("Castle of Mansur", or Kurdish variation Semsûr) was difficult for the locals to pronounce, people were referring the city as adı (its name) yaman (tough) since the early 19th century, u.e. "its name is tough" or "(the place) whose name is tough" in Turkish.
- Afyonkarahisar: from Turkish pronunciation: [afjonkaɾahiˈsaɾ], Turkish: afyon "poppy, opium", kara "black", hisar "fortress"., i.e. The black castle of the Opium city in Turkish (The area around has a long tradition of growing opium for the drug industry and was subject of much controversy when under US pressure Turkey forbade opium growing for a period in the seventies).
- Ağrı: From Ağrı (Ararat) Dağı (mountain), Turkification of Kurdish Agirî (first as Eğri). The town center was known earlier as Karaköse (kara black, köse beardless and mustacheless, i.e. The guy with dark complexion lacking facial hair in Turkish) formalized from KaraKise, short for Kara Kilise (Black Church) referencing a medieval Armenian church at Alashkert (Armenian: Ալաշկերտ Alaškert) some 34 km west.
- Aksaray: From Ak (white) Saray (serail/palace), i.e. The white palace.
- Akyaka, Muğla: From Ak (white) Yaka (side/coast), i.e. The white shore.
- Alanya: The Seljuks renamed the city Alaiye (علائیه), a derivative of the Sultan Alaeddin Kayqubad I's name, from earlier versions (in Latin as Coracesium or in Greek as Korakesion from the Luwian Korakassa meaning "point/protruding city", The Roman Catholic Church still recognizes the Latin name as a titular see in its hierarchy. Under the Byzantine Empire it became known as Kalonoros or Kalon Oros, meaning "beautiful/fine mountain" in Greek, In Italian Candelore or Cardelloro.). In his 1935 visit, Mustafa Kemal Atatürk finalized the name in the new alphabet as Alanya, changing the 'i' and 'e' in Alaiye, reportedly because of a misspelled telegram in 1933.
- Aliağa: after a member of the influential Karaosmanoğulları ayan family, Karaosmanoğlu Ali Ağa, who owned an estate here.
- Amasya: From the Greek name Ἀμάσεια comes from Amasis, the queen of the Amazons, who were said to have lived here. The name has changed little throughout history: Ἀμάσεια, Amaseia, Amassia and Amasia are all found on ancient Greek and Roman coinage and continue to be used in modern Greek. Armenian: Ամասիա, Ottoman Turkish أماصيا, and modern Turkish Amasya all represent the same pronunciation.
- Anamur: from the Ancient Greek "Anemourion" (Ἀνεμούριον), Latinized as "Anemurium", meaning "windmill".
- Ankara: From the original Ánkyra (Ἄγκυρα, lit "anchor") in Greek and Ancyra in Latin, Angora in many European languages and Engürü in Ottoman Turkish.
- Antakya: From Arabic: انطاكيا, Anṭākyā, previously أنطاكيّة, Anṭākīyyah from Syriac: ܐܢܛܝܘܟܝܐ, Anṭiokia; Greek: Ἀντιόχεια, Antiókheia
- Antalya: The city was founded as "Attaleia" (Ancient Greek: Ἀττάλεια), named after its founder Attalos II, king of Pergamon. This name, still in use in Greek, was later evolved in Turkish as Adalia and then Antalya.
- Ardahan: from Georgian: არტაანი, Art'aani; Armenian: Արդահան, Ardahan.
- Artvin: from Georgian: ართვინი, Artvini; Laz: ართვინი Artvini, Armenian: Արդվին Ardvin
- Aydın: from /ˈaɪdɪn/ EYE-din; Turkish: [ˈajdɯn] (meaning enlightened); formerly named Güzelhisar. Ancient Greek name is Tralles.
- Ayvalık: from Ayva (quince) and lık (suffix along with lik, luk, and lük to mean purposed for') i.e. quince orchard in Turkish. Ancient Greek name is Kydonies (Κυδωνίες). The new name is Hellenized to Aivali (Αϊβαλί).
- Balıkesir: from Türkmen Balak Hisar because of the remains of castle, as Hisar is the Turkish word for castle. The castle was Byzantine small town which had become increasingly neglected, known as Palaeokastron (Greek: Παλαιόκαστρο) meaning Old Castle. The original castle was emperor built for Hadrian in A.D. 124, as a result of a successful bear hunting. Pre-Byzantine dynasty had used this castle as a vacation area and for hunting.
- Bartın: From the antique Parthenios city (Παρθένιος in Greek) which dates back to 1200 BC, when its area was inhabited by the Kaskian tribe.
- Batman: origin of the name "Batman" for the river and the oil city is unclear: it might be a shortening of the name of the 1,228-metre (4,029 ft) tall Bati Raman mountain located nearby or refer to the unit of weight used in the Ottoman Empire.
- Bingöl: Its old name is Çapakçur. This name was given by Alexander the Great. (Zazaki: Çolig,Kurdish: Çewlîg,Armenian: Ճապաղջուր, romanized: Chapaghjur)
- Bitlis: From Armenian: Բաղեշ Baghesh/Paghesh; Kurdish: Bidlîs; Classical Syriac: ܒܝܬ ܕܠܝܣ Beṯ Dlis; Ottoman Turkish: بتليس; Medieval Greek: Βαλαλης Balales
- Bodrum: In classical antiquity Bodrum was known as Halicarnassus (ancient Greek: Ἁλικαρνασσός, Turkish: Halikarnas), a major city in ancient Caria. The modern name Bodrum derives from the town's medieval name Petronium, which has its roots in the Hospitaller Castle of St. Peter (see history).
- Bolu: From Boli, Turkicized short for the Greek Polis 'city'.
- Burdur: From the Byzantine era, city bearing the name Polydorion (Greek: Πολυδώριον).
- Burhaniye: renamed Burhaniye after the Ottoman Prince Şehzade Burhanettin. previously called Taylıeli ('Town of Taylı') village, named after one of the Turkish beys who came to the aid of Seljuk ruler Süleyman. At the beginning of the 14th century it came under the domain of the Karasids and grew as it attracted migrants. In Ottoman times, it was also known as Kemer and attached to Edremit until 1866.
- Bursa: After Prusias I, the King of Bithynia who in 202 BC. was granted the Greek city of Cius, which rebuilt the city and renamed it Prusa (Ancient Greek: Προῦσα; sometimes rendered as Prussa)
- Çanakkale: From Çanakkale ceramics, compared by one traveler to Delftware, and an Ottoman fortress called Kale-i Sultaniye (Ottoman Turkish: قلعة سلطانيه) or Sultaniye kalesi (Fortress of the Sultan). As of 1920, the British began to call Çanakkale, Chanak and Kale Sultanie in their reporting. The place was earlier known by the straits Greek name Δαρδανέλλια, Dardanellia,
- Çankırı: From its name in antiquity Gangra. The city has also been known as Changra, Kandari or Kanghari.
- Çeşme: From "Çeşme" meaning "spring, fountain" in Persian (چشمه), and the first settlement 2 km south of the present-day center Çeşmeköy ('town with fountain' in Turkish) founded by Tzachas.
- Çorum: Turkish pronunciation: [ˈtʃoɾum]; Medieval Greek: Ευχάνεια, romanized: Euchaneia from Karum Akkadian: kārum "quay, port, commercial district", plural kārū, from Sumerian kar "fortification (of a harbor), break-water" ancient Assyrian trade posts in Anatolia (modern Turkey) from the 20th to 18th centuries BC.
- Datça: from Stadia, a name of the city of Cnidus. Stadia developed into Tadya, Dadya, Dadça, and then Datça.
- Denizli: In the 17th century, the Turkish traveler Evliya Çelebi visited Denizli and recorded the town as follows: "The city is called by Turks as (Denizli) (which means has abundant of water sources like sea in Turkish) as there are several rivers and lakes around it. In fact it is a four-day trip from the sea."
- Dikili: origin of the name (means upright in Turkish) is unclear, might mean an obelisk, a single stone column, or a not-fallen dead tree. Ancient Pitane and as yet unexplored site of Atarneus are located nearby.
- Diyarbakır: from diyar (land of) and bakr (unclear which of these is the origin: tribe name bakr, or Kurdish for north bakur, or Turkish for cupper bakır) The city is called Kurdish: Amed, Arabic: ديار بكر, Diyaru Bakr, Syriac: ܐܡܝܕܐ, romanized: Amida, Armenian: Տիգրանակերտ, romanized: Dikranagerd)
- Doğubeyazıt: from Doğu (east) and Beyazit after the Turkish warlord Celayırlı Şehzade Bayazıt Han who ordered one of the rebuildings (in 1374) even though the old castle with Armenian name Daruynk. was repaired many times throughout history. Ultimately, the town was renamed Beyazit itself in the 16th century and later in the 1930s a new town was built in the plain below the old site, hence the new name "Doğubayazıt", which literally means "East Beyazıt".
- Düzce: From Düzce Pazar (Flattish Bazaar or market on flat ground) a marketplace on the plain 8 km from the historical Konuralp, the seat of the Turkish conqueror of the area on behalf of Osman I at 13th century.
- Edirne: From Adrianople (Hadrianopolis in Latin or Adrianoupolis in Greek, founded by the Roman emperor Hadrian on the site of a previous Thracian settlement named Uskudama),
- Edremit, Balıkesir: From the original in Greek Adramyttion (Άδραμύττιον) or Adramytteion (Άδραμύττειον)
- Enez: From the original in Greek Ainos (Greek: Αἶνος), Latinized as Aenus.
- Erbaa: From "Erbaa" means "four" in Arabic. Erek (Niksar and Amasya), Karayaka, Sonusa (Uluköy), and Taşâbat (Taşova) were collectively named as Nevah-i Erbaa, "four towns" in Arabic as they were in the same region and close to one another.
- Erdek: formerly Artàke, Greek: Αρτάκη
- Erzincan: Acilisene, the ancient city that is now Erzincan, was the site of the Peace of Acilisene by which in AD 387 Armenia was divided into two vassal states, a smaller one dependent on the Byzantine Empire and a larger one dependent on Persia. This is the name (Ἀκιλισηνή in Greek) by which it is called by Strabo in his Geography, 11.4.14. The etymological origin of the word is disputed, but it is agreed that the city was once called Erez. For a while it was called Justinianopolis in honour of Emperor Justinian. In more recent Greek it has been called as Κελτζηνή (Keltzene) and Κελεζηνή (Kelezene) In the Armenian language, the 5th-century Life of Mashtots called it Yekeghiats In the more recent past, it was known in Armenian as Երզնկա (Yerznka)
- Erzurum: A neighboring commercial city named Artze (Arcn, Arzan; Armenian: Արծն) was heavily sacked by the Seljuk Turks in 1048–49. Its Armenian, Syrian, and other Christian inhabitants moved to Theodosiopolis, which they began calling "Artsn Rum" (meaning Artze of the Rûm, i.e., Romans) to distinguish it from their former residence. Some older sources derive the name Erzurum from the Arabic Arḍ ar-Rūm (Arabic: ارض الروم) 'land of the Rûm'.
- Eskişehir: The name Eskişehir literally means "Old City" in Turkish; indeed, the city was founded by the Phrygians in at least 1000 BC, although it has been estimated to be older than 4000 years old. The city was known as Dorylaeum (Δορύλαιον) in Greek under the Roman Christian era.
- Fethiye: In 1934, the city was renamed 'Fethiye' in honor of Yüzbaşı Fethi Bey one of the first pilots of the Ottoman Air Force, killed in 1914 by Al-Samra. Modern Fethiye is located on the site of the ancient city of Telmessos. Over the centuries, it has been called Telmissos, Anastasioupolis, Makre, Makri (Μάκρη, "long one") and Beskaza during the Turkish period.
- Gaziantep: formerly called Antep or Aīntāb (عين تاب) in Ottoman Turkish, 'Aīntāb (عينتاب) in Arabic, there are several theories for the origin of its name:
  - Aïntap may be derived from khantap, meaning "king's land" in the Hittite language.
  - Aïn, an Arabic and Aramaic word meaning "spring", and tab as a word of praise.
  - Antep could be a corruption of the Arabic 'aīn ṭayyib meaning "good spring". However, the Arabic name for the city is spelled with t (ت), not ṭ (ط).
  - Ayin dab or Ayin debo in Aramaic, meaning "spring of the wolf"
  - The Crusaders called the city and its castle "Hantab", "Hamtab", and "Hatab".
  - Gaziantep is the probable site of the Hellenistic city of Antiochia ad Taurum ("Antiochia in the Taurus Mountains").
  - In February 1921, the Turkish parliament honored the city as غازى عينتاب Ghazi Aīntāb or "Antep the war hero" to commemorate its resistance to the French Siege of Aintab during the Franco-Turkish War, part of the Turkish War of Independence, and that name was officially adopted in 1928 as Gaziantep.
- Gebze: Origin of the name is unclear. Ottoman records contains these variations: Geybüyze, Geybüveyze, Geyibüveyze, Geyiboyze, Geykivize. Evliya Celebi in one of his trips called it Kekbeziye, in another trip he gave the sentence "Gel bize" (come to us in Turkish) as explanation for the origin.
- Gelibolu: from Greek: Καλλίπολις, Kallipolis, "Beautiful City"
- Giresun: formerly Cerasus (Κερασοῦς) in Greek. the etymology might be related to the Greek word κερασός (kerasós) "cherry" + -ουντ (a place marker). Thus, the Greek root of the word "cherry", κερασός (kerasós), predates the name of the city, and the ultimate origin of the word cherry (and thus the name of the city) is probably from a Pre-Greek substrate, likely of Anatolian origin, given the intervocalic σ in Κερασοῦς and the apparent cognates of it found in other languages the region. Another theory derives Kerasous from κέρας (keras) "horn" + -ουντ (a place marker), for the prominent horn-shaped peninsula that the city is situated on (compare with the Greek name for the horn-shaped Golden Horn waterway in Istanbul, Κέρας (Keras) "Horn"). The toponym would have later mutated into Kerasunt (sometimes written Kérasounde or Kerassunde), and the word "cherry" (as well as its cognates found in other local languages) was derived from the name of the city itself, rather than the other way around.
- Göcek, Fethiye: possibly from Turkish male name meaning young, fresh, beautiful. The word also is used to mean one foot tall young wheat plant.
- Güllük: Literally "for roses" or rose garden.
- Gümüşhane: From gümüş (silver), and hane (house) i.e. silver house in Turkish. Name due to the many silver mines in the area. The Greek population used the unofficial translation to Argyrópolis or Arghyropolis, Αργυρόπολις for a time in the 19th century.
- Hakkari: unclear name origin (undocumented suggestions: Hakkar tribe, hak-kar-in = can-do-just)
- Iğdır: after a western Turkish clan called Iğdır that belonged to a branch of the Oghuz Turks.
- İskenderun: From Alexander the great
- Isparta: from Greek: Σπάρτη, Baris/Βάρις in Byzantine Greek
- Istanbul: Derived from the Medieval Greek phrase "εἰς τὴν Πόλιν" (pronounced [is tim ˈbolin]), which means "to the city", how Constantinople was referred to as the only major city in the vicinity by the local Greeks.
- İzmit: from the Ancient Greek name of the city, Nicomedia (Greek: Νικομήδεια). Names used in English prior to official Turkish Latinization include Ismid, Iskimid, and Isnikmid.
- İzmir: from original Greek name "Smyrna" and "Smyrne" (Σμύρνη)
- Kahramanmaraş:
- Kandıra: From Kéndri or Kándora.
- Karabük: From Kara (black) and bük (bush) i.e. black bush in Turkish. Karabük was built in the 1930s as the seat of the iron and steel industry of Turkey.
- Karaman: From Karaman Bey who was one of the rulers of the Karamanid dynasty. The former name was Laranda which in turn comes from the Luwian language Larawanda, literally "sandy, a sandy place".
- Kars: As Chorzene, the town appears in Roman historiography (Strabo) as part of ancient Armenia. For the origin of the name "Kars", some sources claim it to be derived from the Georgian word კარი (kari), meaning "the gate" as was the case for other border region strongholds while other sources claim it is from the Armenian word հարս (hars), meaning "bride", or rather from կառուց բերդ (kaṛuts berd), "Kaṛuts Fortress". The Turkish etymology offered by M. Fahrettin Kırzıoğlu (that the name came from the "Karsak", a Turkish tribe), has been dismissed as unsustainable by scholars.
- Kastamonu: The city is believed to have been founded in the 18th century BC. The town was known as Timonion (Τιμόνιον in Greek) during the Roman period. The change of name of the town dates to the 10th century AD. Manuel Erotikos Komnenos, a Thracian soldier who became a prominent general and the father of the Byzantine emperor Isaac I Komnenos, was given lands around Kastamonu by Emperor Basil II and built a fortress there named Kastra Komnenon (Κάστρα Κομνηνών). Manuel came to the notice of Basil II because of his defence, in 978, of Nicaea against the rebel Bardas Skleros. The name Kastra Komnenon was shortened to Kastamone, and later turkified to Kastamoni and Kastamonu.
- Karataş: From Kara (black) and taş (stone) i.e. black stone in Turkish.
- Kaş: in the 1600s the Lord of Teke observed Kaş and Meis from the top of the hill and said, "If the islet of Meis Adası is the eye, then this place will be its kaş (eyebrow in Turkish)." It seems Kaş was founded by the Lycians, as Habesos or Habesa. In the Hellenistic period and under the Roman Empire it served as the port of Phellus. It was called Andifli under Arab, Seljuks, and Ottomans, and Kaş since the 1600s.
- Kayseri: originally called Mazaka or Mazaca by the Hattians and was known as such to Strabo, during whose time it was the capital of the Roman province of Cilicia, known also as Eusebia at the Argaeus (Εὐσέβεια ἡ πρὸς τῶι Ἀργαίωι in Greek), after Ariarathes V Eusebes, King of Cappadocia (163–130 BC). The name was changed again by Archelaus (d. 17 AD), last King of Cappadocia (36 BC–14 AD) and a Roman vassal, to "Caesarea in Cappadocia" (to distinguish it from other cities with the name Caesarea in the Roman Empire) in honour of Caesar Augustus, upon his death in 14 AD. When the Muslim Arabs arrived, they adapted the pronunciation to their writing resulting in Kaisariyah (note that letter C in classical Latin was pronounced K), and this eventually became Kayseri when the Seljuk Turks took control of the city in circa 1080, remaining as such ever since.
- Kazlıçeşme, Zeytinburnu: from the historic fountain (Turkish: çeşme) with a relief goose (Turkish: kaz) figure below the fountain's inscription, which dates it back to Hijri year AH 953 (AD 1537).
- Kilis: In the tablets belonging to the Assyrian period, the name 'Ki-li-zi' is written in cuneiform and a city named as "Ciliza Sive Urnagiganti" during the Roman Empire period is mentioned.
- Kırklareli: From 'Kırk' (Forty) and 'El' (Area), i.e. The land of the forties in Turkish.
- Kırşehir: From 'Kır' (grey / steppe ) and 'şehir' (city), i.e. The grey / steppe city in Turkish.
- Kırıkkale: From 'Kırık' (broken) and 'kale' (castle), i.e. The broken castle in Turkish.
- Konya: from εἰκών (icon), as an ancient Greek legend ascribed its name to the "eikon" (image), or the "gorgon's (Medusa's) head", with which Perseus vanquished the native population before founding the city. if not hellenised from an earlier Luvian name.
- Kuşadası: From 'Kuş' (bird) and 'ada' (islet), i.e. The island of birds in Turkish.
- Kütahya: From the original in Greek Kotyaion, Latinized in Roman times as Cotyaeum.
- Malatya: From the Hittite Malidiya (melid or milit which means "honey").
- Manisa: From Magnesia (Greek: Μαγνησία) the place where the original magnetic rocks came from.
- Mardin: From a Syriac/Assyrian Neo-Aramaic language name translating to "fortress" used as the Roman period name Marida (Merida),
- Marmara Ereğlisi: From name given 300 AD as Heraclea (Ἡράκλεια).
- Marmaris: From the Turkish word mermer, Greek màrmaron (marble) in reference to the rich deposits of marble in the region.
- Mersin: From Mersin Bey, a leader of the Oghuz Turks, a local clan named Mersinoğulları reported by Evliya Çelebi
- Milas: From ancient name (Ancient Greek: Μύλασα, Mylasa) associated with Lycians
- Muğla: From ancient name Mobolla
- Muş: From Mushki the ancient clan with clover as sign that built the original castle later demolished by Suleiman the Magnificent
- Nazilli: According to legend, the son of Aydın's governor in the Ottoman period, fell in love with a young woman from Pazarköy but was rejected by the girl's father. The young man later named the town Nazlı Ili (Nazlı's Hometown) after his loved one.
- Nevşehir: From Nev ('new'), and şehir ('city') i.e. 'New town' in Ottoman Turkish')
- Niğde: From Anahita, Nakita or Nahita an ancient goddess for fertility. Later (Ancient Greek: Νίγδη), Nakida, Nekide, Nîkde (1400)
- Ordu: From Ordu ('army') the 12,000-strong army gathered at Eskipazar in 1396 by Hacı Emiroğlu Süleyman Bey to conquer Giresun.
- Osmaniye: Related to Osman
- Rize: From the original in Greek ρίζα (riza) or Ριζαίον (Rizaion), meaning "mountain slopes",ρίζα in Greek means root.
- Samsun: From the original in Greek: Amisos (Αμισός) by a reinterpretation of eis Amison (meaning "to Amisos") and ounta (Greek suffix for place names) to eis Sampsunda (Σαμψούντα) and then Samsun (pronounced [samsun]).
- Şanlıurfa: From prehistoric Ur, ܐܘܪܗܝ Urhai in Syriac, Ուռհա Uṙha in Armenian, الرها Ar-Ruhā in Arabic and Ορρα, Orrha in Greek (also Ορροα, Orrhoa). Şanlı means "great, glorious, dignified" in Turkish.
- Siirt: From Keert or Kaa'rat ('city' in Chaldean), (Arabic: سِعِرْد Siʿird, Armenian: Սղերդ Sġerd, Syriac: ܣܥܪܬ siʿreth, Kurdish: Sêrt, Ottoman Turkish: سعرد Greek: Σύρτη)
- Sinop: from the original in Greek: Σινώπη, translit. Sinṓpē, historically known as Sinope /sɪˈnoʊpi/, after Sinope the goddess from Greek mythology.
- Şebinkarahisar: From Turkish: şap (alum in Turkish), kara (black in Turkish) and hisar (fort in Turkish) as a reference to the Alum factory that made Germiyanids rich thanks to a monopoly of alum needed to fix colors on fabric. Other names : Colonia, in Greek Koloneia (Κολώνεια), Koğoniya. turkified at the time as Kuğuniya., Mavrokastron (Greek for "Black Fortress"), Karahisar (Greek: Γαράσαρη, Gareysar by greeks of the 14th century), Şapkarahisar, Kara Hisar-ı Şarkî/Şarkî Kara Hisar ("Black Fortress of the East" to differentiate it from Afyonkarahisar farther to the west), Nikopoli (Greek: Νικόπολη);. It should not be confused with the nearby Koyulhisar, where the ruins of ancient Roman Nikopoli lie.
- Şırnak: From Kurdish: Şirnex or Şehr-i Nuh (City of Noah) since it was believed locally, near Cudi Mountain, where Noah's Ark finally to have landed after the Flood.
- Silivri: From the ancient Greek Selymbria or Selybria (Greek: Σηλυ(μ)βρία), after the mythological thracian founder of the city, Selus.
- Sivas: From "Sebaste", which is the feminine form of the Greek name corresponding to Augustus.
- Tarsus, Mersin: from Tarsa, the original name of the city in the Hittite language, which was possibly derived from a pagan god, Tarku.
- Tavşanlı: Named 'with rabbits' in Turkish after a hunting party held by the Ottoman prince Bayezid I, in which he is said to have hunted 7 rabbits.
- Tekirdağ: From tekfur ('Byzantine lord') and dağı ('Mountain belonging to'), i.e. 'Mountain of Byzantine lord' in Turkish.
- Tokat: From Tokat or Toktat ('roofless animal enclosure') in old Turkish.
- Trabzon: From the original in Greek: Τραπεζοῦς (Trapezous), referencing the table-like central hill between the Zağnos (İskeleboz) and Kuzgun streams on which it was founded (τράπεζα meant "table" in Ancient Greek
- Tunceli: The name means the land (eli) of bronze (tunç) in Turkish
- Uşak: From the original in Greek: Ousakeion (Ουσάκειον) Turkified as Uşşak; which could mean "lovers" and "minstrels" simultaneously.
- Van: From Kingdom of Van (Urartian: Biai, Biainili; Armenian: Վանի թագավորություն, romanized: Vani t′agavorut′yun), derived from the Urartian toponym Biainili (or Biaineli), which was adopted in Old Armenian as Van (Վան), because of betacism in linguistics.
- Yalıkavak: From Yalı ('beach property'), and Kavak ('birch tree') i.e. 'birch tree at the beach' in Turkish.
- Yalova: From Yalı ('beach property'), and Ova ('low lying farmland') i.e. 'low lying farmland at the beach' in Turkish.
- Yenişehir, Bursa: From Yeni ('new'), and şehir ('city') i.e. 'New town' in Turkish.
- Yomra: From the name of a type of apple grown locally.
- Yozgat: From Yoz ('grassland'), and Kant ('city') i.e. 'city with grassland' in old Turkish.
- Yumurtalık: From Yumurta ('egg'), and lık (suffix along with lik, luk, and lük to mean purposed for') i.e. 'egg nest' in Turkish
- Zonguldak: from Zone Geul-Dagh, the name given to the area by French and Belgian mining companies to refer to the zone near "Geul-Dagh" or Göldağı ('Lake Mountain'), the highest mountain in the vicinity.

== Toponymy of Turkish regions ==
- Sakarya Province: From (Turkish: Sakarya Irmağı, Greek: Σαγγάριος, romanized: Sangarios), the third longest river in Turkey that crosses the area and runs into the Black Sea.
- İçel Province: From İç ('inner' as opposed to coastal), and el ('place/area/land populated by strangers') i.e. 'inner land' in Turkish.
- Dicle Province: From (Turkish: Dicle (Tigris) river that crosses the area. The name derives through Akkadian Idiqlat from the original Sumerian name for the river, Idigna.
- Hatay Province: From the Neo-Hittite "Hattena" people that ruled the area after Hittites before Assyrians

=== Toponymy of Turkish historical regions ===
Texts about antique history use invariably region names that are no longer in use, very often they are in the area within present day Turkey.

- Paphlagonia: From the legends from Paphlagon, a son of Phineus. (Eustath. ad Horn. II. ii. 851, ad Dion. Per. 787; Steph. B. t.v.; Const. Porph. de Them. i. 7.)
- Bithnia or Sakarya: Named in antiquity for the Thracian tribe of the Bithyni, mentioned by Herodotus (VII.75) alongside the Thyni.
- Cilicia or Çukurova: The low lying (Çukur) meadows (Ova) in Turkish, the name in antiquity is from the eponymous Hellene founder in the purely mythical Cilix
- Pontus

== Hydronyms of Turkey ==
- Bosphorus: from the Ancient Greek Βόσπορος (Bosporos), which was folk-etymologised as βοὸς πόρος, i.e. "cattle strait"
- Çanakkale Boğazı or Dardanelles(/dɑːrdəˈnɛlz/; Turkish: Çanakkale Boğazı, Greek: Δαρδανέλλια, romanized: Dardanellia), also known from Classical Antiquity as the Hellespont (/ˈhɛlɪspɒnt/; Ancient Greek: Ἑλλήσποντος, Hellespontos, literally "Sea of Helle")
- Marmara Denizi or Propontis: The sea of (denizi) Marmara; From Marmara Island, which is rich in sources of marble, from the Greek μάρμαρον (marmaron), "marble". The sea's ancient Greek name Propontis derives from pro- (before) and pontos (sea), deriving from the fact that the Greeks sailed through it to reach the Black Sea, Pontos.
- Ege denizi: The sea of (denizi) Aegea (Ege); Named after the Greek town of Aegae; after Aegea, a queen of the Amazons who died in the sea; Aigaion, the "sea goat", another name of Briareus, one of the archaic Hecatonchires; or, especially among the Athenians, Aegeus, the father of Theseus, who drowned himself in the sea when he thought his son had died. A possible etymology is a derivation from the Greek word αἶγες – aiges = "waves" (Hesychius of Alexandria; metaphorical use of αἴξ (aix) "goat"), hence "wavy sea", cf. also αἰγιαλός (aigialos = aiges (waves) + hals (sea)), hence meaning "sea-shore".
- Kara Deniz or pontos (sea): From Kara ('black'), and Deniz ('sea') i.e. 'Black Sea' in Turkish adopted after the 13th century. The principal name used earlier is Greek name "Póntos Áxeinos", generally accepted to be a rendering of Iranian word *axšaina- ("dark colored"). Black is the cardinal color indicating north (south=red, west=white, east=green or blue). Altered version á-xe(i)nos. Mythological version the "Inhospitable Sea", Πόντος Ἄξεινος Póntos Áxeinos, More euphemistic version the "Hospitable sea", Εὔξεινος Πόντος Eúxeinos Póntos; both were first attested in Pindar (c. 475 BC).
- Ak Deniz or Mediterranean Sea: From Ak ('white'), and Deniz ('sea') i.e. 'White Sea' in Turkish;
- Kızılırmak River or Kizil River: From Kızıl (red) ırmak (river) in Turkish due to its red coloured water, also known as the Halys River (Ancient Greek: Ἅλυς) (N. Marr explained its name by the Laz word meaning "river"), the longest river in Turkey.
- Yeşilırmak River or Yeşil River: From Yeşil (green) ırmak (river) in Turkish due to its water reflecting the green mountain slopes, or from the direction it originates (green=east), also known in classical Greek as Greek: Ίρις, Iris.
- Sakarya River: From name in Greek Greek: Σαγγάριος, romanized: Sangarios, the third longest river in Turkey.
- Fırat or Euphrates: From /juːˈfreɪtiːz/; Sumerian: 𒌓𒄒𒉣 Buranuna; Akkadian: 𒌓𒄒𒉣 Purattu; Arabic: الفرات, romanized: al-Furāt; Syriac: ̇ܦܪܬ Pǝrāt; Armenian: Եփրատ: Yeprat; Hebrew: פרת Perat; Turkish: Fırat; Kurdish: Firat
- Dicle or Tigris : The name derives through Akkadian Idiqlat from the original Sumerian name for the river, Idigna.
- Van Gölü: Other names in local languages (Armenian: Վանա լիճ, Vana lič̣, Kurdish: Gola Wanê) are similar and derive from Kingdom of Van (Urartian: Biai, Biainili; Armenian: Վանի թագավորություն, romanized: Vani t′agavorut′yun), derived from the Urartian toponym Biainili (or Biaineli), which was adopted in Old Armenian as Van (Վան), because of betacism in linguistics.
- Tuz Gölü: From Tuz ('salt'), and Gölü ('lake of') i.e. 'Lake of salt' in Turkish

== Etymology of Anatolia and Thrace ==
- Asia Minor or Anatolia : from Medieval and Modern Greek: Μικρά Ἀσία Mikrá Asía, "small Asia"; Turkish: Küçük Asya), Asian Turkey, the Anatolian peninsula, or the Anatolian plateau, Greek Ἀνατολή Anatolḗ; Turkish: Anadolu "east" or "[sun]rise"). The Asian part of Turkey i.e. the part east of bosphorus, Maramara and Dardanelles.
- Thrace : from the heroine and sorceress Thrace, who was the daughter of Oceanus and Parthenope, and sister of Europa. The word Thrace indicating the European part of Turkey i.e. the part west of bosphorus, Maramara and Dardanelles, was established by the Greeks for referring to the Thracian tribes, from ancient Greek Thrake (Θρᾴκη), descending from Thrāix (Θρᾷξ). It referred originally to the Thracians, an ancient Indo-European people inhabiting Southeast Europe. The name Europe first referred to Thrace proper, prior to the term vastly extending to refer to its modern concept. In Turkish, it may be referred to as Rumeli, Land of the Romans, owing to this region being the last part of the Eastern Roman Empire that was conquered by the Ottoman Empire.

== See also ==
- List of largest cities and towns in Turkey
- Metropolitan municipalities in Turkey
- List of rivers of Turkey
- List of lakes of Turkey
