= Mediterranean (disambiguation) =

The Mediterranean Sea is a major body of water south of Europe, west of Asia and north of Africa.

Mediterranean may also refer to:

== Geography ==
- Mediterranean seas, an oceanographic term to designate a mostly enclosed sea that has limited exchange of deep water with outer oceans
- Mediterranean basin, the European, Asian, and African land areas surrounding the Mediterranean Sea
- Mediterranean climate, a type of climate that resembles the weather in the Mediterranean basin
- Mediterranean Europe, those European countries that have a Mediterranean coastline
- Mediterranean forests, woodlands, and scrub, an ecoregion found in various parts of the world, named for the Mediterranean basin
- A list of Mediterranean countries

== Politics and military ==
- Mediterranean States, the two countries of Cyprus and Malta
- Union for the Mediterranean, a political partnership of European, African and Middle Eastern countries
- Mediterranean Dialogue, a forum of cooperation between NATO and seven countries of the Mediterranean
- Mediterranean Theater of Operations, a major theatre of World War II
- Mediterranean pass, a document which identified a ship as being protected under a treaty with states of the Barbary Coast
- Méditerranée, the name of a historical department of the First French Empire in present-day Italy

== Other uses ==
- "The Mediterranean" (La Méditerranée), a historical work by Fernand Braudel
- "The Mediterranean", a 1933 poem by Allen Tate
- Ansa Mediterranean, an Italian news agency
- Mediterranean League, a football league played in Spain during the Spanish Civil War
- Mediterranean diet, a modern nutritional recommendation inspired by traditional dietary patterns of Greece, Southern Italy, Spain and Portugal
  - Mediterranean cuisine, the food from the cultures adjacent to the Mediterranean Sea
- Mediterranean race, a historical racial classification
- Familial Mediterranean fever, a hereditary inflammatory disorder
- Mediterranean University, a university located in Podgorica, Montenegro

== See also ==
- British Mediterranean Airways, an airline in the United Kingdom
- Mediterranean Ridge, a wide ridge in the bed of the Mediterranean Sea
- Mediterranean noir, a literary style in fiction
- Mediterranean Revival architecture, a design style during the 20th century
- Classical antiquity
- Mediterranea (film), a 2015 film
- Mediterranean Universities Union, an association of universities based in the Mediterranean basin
- Mediterranean Grand Prix, a motor race held in Sicily from 1962 until 1998
- Mediterranean Games, a multi-sport games held every four years
- Mediterranean Harbor, one of the Tokyo Disney Sea's themed areas
- List of Mediterranean fleets
- Mediterranean Squadron (disambiguation)
- Mediterranean Shearwater (disambiguation)
