= Mubeyyin Batu Altan =

Crimean Tatar activist

Mubeyyin Batu Altan is an American Crimean Tatar scholar, activist and leading figure in the American Crimean Tatar community.

== Life ==
Altan was born in Crimea in the Ukrainian SSR to a displaced Crimean Tatar family from Sudak. Their original surname was Muhtar but it was changed when they settled in a refugee camp in Tuzla, Turkey. In the 1960s his family migrated to the US, where he studied first at the University of Bridgeport where he received undergraduiate and graduate degrees in political science and later at the Inner Asian and Altaic Studies Department of Harvard University. In 1986 he started publishing the Crimean Review, the first English-language magazine on the national movement of the Crimean Tatars. From 1999 to 2003 he was the president of the International Committee for Crimea and currently serves as the director of the Crimean Tatar Research and Information Center.
