= Mediterraneo (disambiguation) =

Mediterraneo may refer to:

== Architecture ==
- Mediterraneo Stadium in Almería, Spain

== Cinema ==
- Mediterraneo, 1991 Italian war comedy-drama
- Mediterraneo: The Law of the Sea, 2021 Spanish drama

== Music ==
- Mediterráneo (Joan Manuel Serrat album), 1971
- Mediterraneo (Bresh album), 2025

== Publishing ==
- Mediterráneo (newspaper), Spanish newspaper

== See also ==
- Mediterranean (disambiguation)
- Mediterranea University of Reggio Calabria
