= MV Akdeniz =

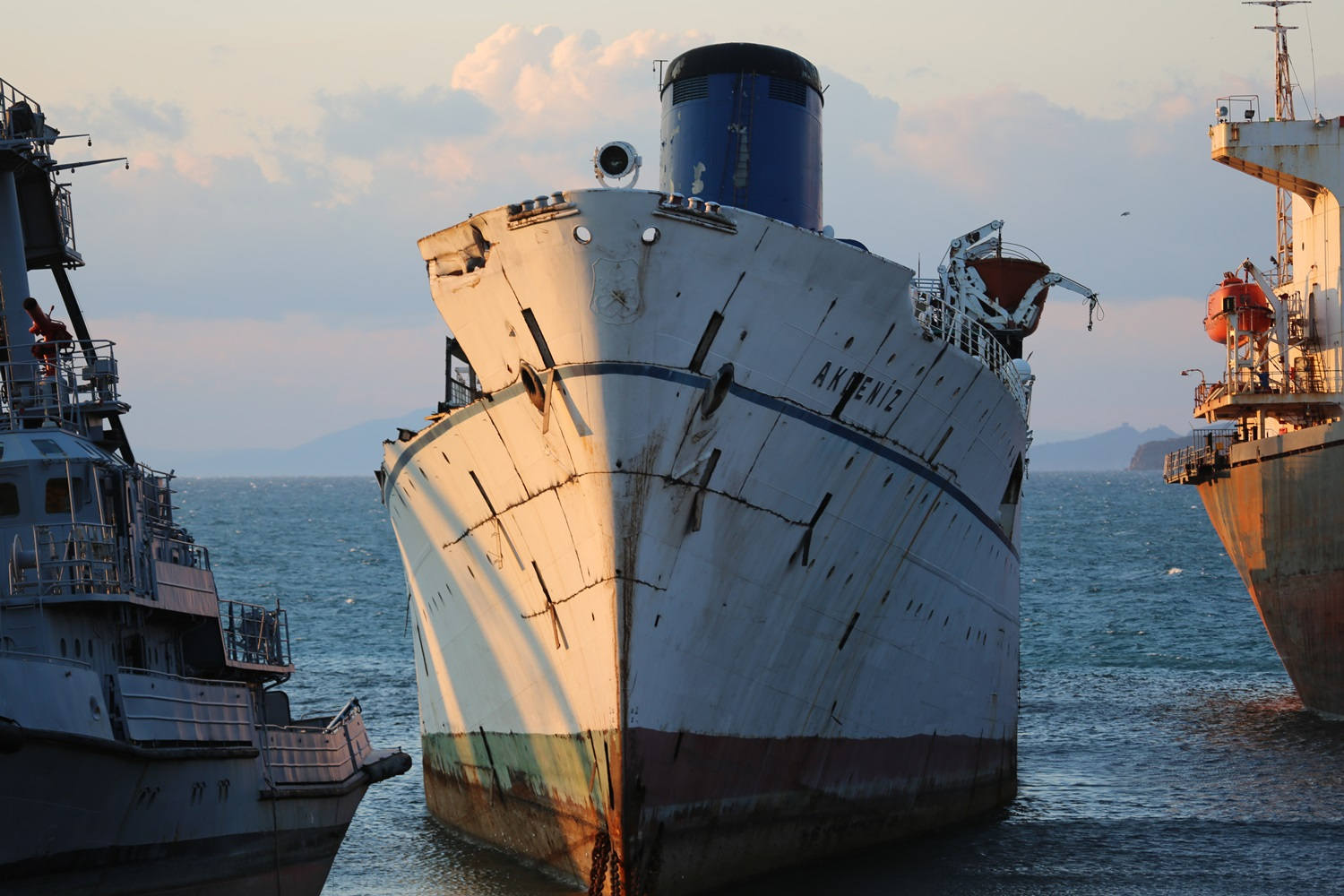
- Akdeniz in the process of being scrapped, 2016

History

Turkey
- Name: MV Akdeniz
- Owner: Turkish Maritime Lines (1956–1997); Istanbul Technical University (1997–2016)
- Operator: Turkish Maritime Lines (1956–1997); Faculty of Maritime (1997–2016)
- Builder: AG Weser Shipyards, West Germany
- Launched: 1955
- In service: 1956
- Identification: IMO number: 5006815; Callsign: TCXJ
- Fate: Scrapped in Aliağa, 2016

General characteristics
- Tonnage: 8,809 tons
- Displacement: 7,864
- Length: 474 feet
- Beam: 61 feet
- Draught: 20 foot 3
- Propulsion: Stabilizers
- Speed: 16 knots
- Capacity: 1955–1980 – 1,056; 1980–1990 – 561; 1990–present – 314
- Crew: 158

The MV Akdeniz was a 1955 built Turkish passenger ship that served on both ferry and cruise voyages for the Turkish Maritime Lines until she became a student accommodation and training ship in Tuzla, Istanbul Province for the Maritime Technology branch of the Istanbul Technical University. Ms Akdeniz never served as a ferry. It was built as a combi ship, for carrying passengers and cargo as well.

== Turkish Maritime Lines ==
The Akdeniz was the first of two near identical sister ships launched in 1955 for Northern and Southern Mediterranean ferry service, the other being the MV Karadeniz. She operated this service until 1960, when she was transferred to the Istanbul to İzmir and Black Sea Express routes. After this, she would go on back-to-back 25-day ferry voyages, beginning in Istanbul and ending in Barcelona, Spain with several stops along the way. She continued this uneventfully until 1980, when the Akdeniz and her sister went through a refit that saw them become one class ships. Later in the early 1980s Turkish Maritime decided to end their ferry services, so Akdeniz started Turkish coastal cruises out of Istanbul in the early 1980s. In 1984 a boiler explosion on board the MV Karadeniz deemed her unfit for further operational service, so she was beached and scrapped at Aliağa in 1987. Despite this setback the Akdeniz became extremely popular and heavily adored by the Turkish public, and because of this her owners decided it was time for a modernization. In 1989 she entered dry dock for another refit, which saw the installation of air conditioning, a disco, gym and sauna. This minor rebuilding also had her passenger capacity reduced down to 314. The Akdeniz was subsequently chartered to the German company Phoenix Seereisen for several years in the 1990s. In 1997 the Istanbul Technical University began to search for a suitable training and accommodation vessel for their maritime faculty. It was found that the Akdeniz was the most suitable ship for the job, and Turkish Maritime handed her over to the university in July 1997.

== Istanbul Technical University ==
The ship began service with the university in 1998. She remained at anchor in Tuzla, Istanbul until 2006, during which time she survived several harsh storms. Her funnel has been repainted from the classic Turkish Maritime logo to blue; much of her original structure remains, as her superstructure has not been altered in any way over her 55 years of service. The future of the Akdeniz is uncertain since costs to maintain her are very high, but the Faculty of Maritime currently has great interest in preserving the ship for future generations, as an emergency accommodation or hospital ship or a hotel and museum in either Turkey, where she operated, or Germany, where she was built.

Due to heavy maintenance costs caused by strong corrosion, sold to shipbreakers in Aliaga in September 2015.
