= Akdeniz (disambiguation) =

Akdeniz is an urban municipality in Mersin, Turkey.

Akdeniz may also refer to:

- Mediterranean Sea, which is named Akdeniz in Turkish
- Akdeniz Airlines, a defunct charter airline from Turkey
- Akdeniz University, a university in Antalya Province, Turkey
- Akdeniz (sculpture), a sculpture by Ilhan Koman
- MV Akdeniz, a 1955-built Turkish passenger ship

== People with the surname ==
- Deniz Akdeniz (born 1990), Australian actor
- Ferhat Akdeniz (born 1986), Turkish volleyball player
- Batu Akdeniz (born 1993), Turkish musician

== See also ==
- Mediterranean (disambiguation)
