= Postane, Tuzla =

Postane
- Neighbourhood
- Location in Turkey Postane (Istanbul)
- Coordinates: 40°49′0.70″N 29°17′52.91″E
- Country: Turkey
- Province: Istanbul
- District: Tuzla
- Time zone: UTC+3 (TRT)

Postane is a neighbourhood of the municipality and district of Tuzla, Istanbul Province, Turkey.
