= List of Mediterranean fleets =

Several countries have or have had a Mediterranean fleet in their navy:

- Mediterranean Fleet, formerly of the British Royal Navy
- French Mediterranean Fleet
- Mediterranean Squadron (United States)
- United States Sixth Fleet
- Mediterranean Division, a detached unit of the Imperial German Navy
- 5th Operational Squadron, an element of the Soviet Navy
- Permanent task force of the Russian Navy in the Mediterranean Sea
- Mediterranean Fleet (Russian Empire)
