= RV MTA Turkuaz =

History

Turkey
- Name: MTA Turkuaz
- Owner: General Directorate of Mineral Research and Exploration (MTA)
- Operator: Geophysical Directorate for Subsea Geophysical Exploration
- Ordered: April 24, 2012
- Builder: Istanbul Shipyard, Tuzla, Istanbul, Turkey
- Launched: March 28, 2015
- Commissioned: 2017
- Homeport: Istanbul, Turkey
- Identification: IMO number: 9675470
- Status: Active as of 2018

General characteristics
- Class & type: Geophysical exploration ship
- Tonnage: 5,000 GT; 1,500 NT
- Length: 86 m (282 ft 2 in)
- Beam: 23 m (75 ft 6 in)
- Speed: 14 knots (26 km/h) (service); 4.86 knots (9.00 km/h) (research)
- Endurance: 35 days autonomous
- Armament: None

RV MTA Turkuaz is a Turkish research and survey vessel owned by the General Directorate of Mineral Research and Exploration (MTA) in Ankara. Commissioned in early 2017, she will operate in deep waters under the supervision of the Geophysical Directorate for Subsea Geophysical Exploration Division.

The research vessel was ordered by Defence Industry Undersecretariate at Ministry of National Defence on April 24, 2012. She was entirely designed in SEFT Ship Design by Turkish engineers and built at Istanbul Shipyard in Tuzla, Istanbul, Turkey as the first-of-its-kind. She was launched on March 28, 2015. She will conduct a wide variety of research work including oceanography, hydrography, bathymetry, undersea geology, earthquake engineering, climate change, marine pollution, ecological research and undersea engineering in addition to geophysics for oil and gas exploration. The vessel cost around ₺300 million (approximately US$115 million).

It is projected that the vessel will be in use for at least 30 years.

== Characteristics ==
The MTA Turkuaz, a great ocean-going and Arctic-fit vessel, is 86 m (282 ft 2 in) long, with a beam of 23 m (75 ft 6 in). Assessed at 5,000 GT and 1,500 NT, she has a speed of 14 knots (26 km/h) in service and 4.86 knots (9.00 km/h) during research work.

She will be fitted with two- and three-dimensional undersea survey equipment and a remotely operated multipurpose underwater vehicle (ROV). She provides a landing platform capable of supporting the day-and-night operation of a 12-tonne helicopter. 50 personnel including researchers will be on-board the ship, which has an autonomous endurance of 35 days.

Turkish defense electronic systems producing company ASELSAN delivers all the technical and electronic equipment needed for the navigation of the vessel and for the scientific research and survey work, such as the cruise control (navigation) system, the integrated communication system, the oceanographic research systems, the 2D/3D marine seismic survey system and the geological research systems.

== See also ==
- RV MTA Selen
- RV MTA Sismik 1
- List of research vessels of Turkey
