= RV MTA Sismik 1 =

History

Turkey
- Name: MTA Sismik 1; ex Hora (1954); ex Hercules (1949); ex Agir (1942)
- Owner: Istanbul Technical University
- Operator: Faculty of Maritime
- Builder: Nazi Germany
- Launched: 18 May 1942, rebuilt 1976
- Commissioned: 1976
- Homeport: Tuzla, Istanbul
- Identification: IMO number: 5154806; MMSI number: 271002205; Callsign: TCVR
- Status: In active service as training ship

General characteristics
- Class & type: Geophysical exploration ship
- Tonnage: 720 GT; 275 NT
- Length: 56.45 m (185 ft 2 in)
- Beam: 8.80 m (28 ft 10 in)
- Draft: 3.90 m (12 ft 10 in) (max.)
- Installed power: 1,050 hp (780 kW)
- Propulsion: Diesel engine
- Speed: 12 knots (22 km/h) (service)
- Endurance: 25 days autonomous
- Complement: 12 scientists
- Crew: 7 officers and 16 seamen
- Armament: None

The RV MTA Sismik 1 is a decommissioned Turkish research vessel belonging to Istanbul Technical University. She is operated by its Faculty of Maritime for training purposes. Originally, she was owned by the General Directorate of Mineral Research and Exploration (MTA) in Ankara and operated by its division of Geophysical Directorate for subsea geophysical exploration.

The ship's crew consists of 7 officers and 16 seamen. Research work is conducted by 12 scientists aboard. She has an autonomous endurance of 25 days.

== History ==
The ship was built by Danziger Werft in Danzig for Nazi Germany's Kriegsmarine. Named Ägir, she was launched on May 18, 1942. After World War II, she was taken by the United Kingdom to England, where she was rebuilt as a salvage tug, and renamed Hercules in 1949. She was based in Gibraltar from 1950 until 1954 when she was sold to Turkey.

Her Turkish owner, the Denizcilik Bankası renamed her Hora and used as a salvage tug in service four year long from 1954 in Istanbul, and for ten years in İzmir. In 1968, she was acquired by the Port Authority of Izmir to be used as a stationary pilot boat.

In 1975, MTA purchased the ship Hora to transform her into a research vessel, and renamed her MTA Sismik 1. After fitting her with up to date technology equipment for subsea geophysical exploration at seas around Turkey, she was commissioned in 1976.

Finally in 2005, it was decided that the more-than-60-year-old ship has completed her service life. She was donated to Istanbul Technical University's Faculty of Maritime to be used as a training ship.

== Characteristics ==
MTA Sismik 1 is 56.45 m (185 ft 2 in) long, with a beam of 8.80 m (28 ft 10 in) and a max. draft of 3.90 m (12 ft 10 in). Assessed at 720 GT and 275 NT, the ship is propelled by a 1,050 hp (780 kW) diesel engine. She has a speed of 12 knots (22 km/h) in service.

== Ship's register ==
- 1942 ex Agir, built for the German Navy "Kriegsmarine",
- 1949 ex Hercules, taken by the United Kingdom and rebuilt as salvage tug. 1950-1954 in Gibraltar,
- 1954 *ex Hora, sold to Denizcilik Bankası in Turkey as salvage tug. 1954-1958 in Istanbul, 1958-1968 in Izmir. 1968-1970 as stationary pilot boat,
- 1975 acquired by General Directorate of Mineral Research and Exploration (MTA), Geophysical Directorate,
- 1976 MTA Sismik 1, transformed into research vessel by the MTA,
- 2005 MTA Sismik 1, donated to Istanbul Technical University, Faculty of Maritime for training purposes.

== See also ==
- RV MTA Selen
- RV MTA Turkuaz
- List of research vessels of Turkey
