= General Directorate of Mineral Research and Exploration (Turkey) =

Turkish government department which searches for oil and minerals

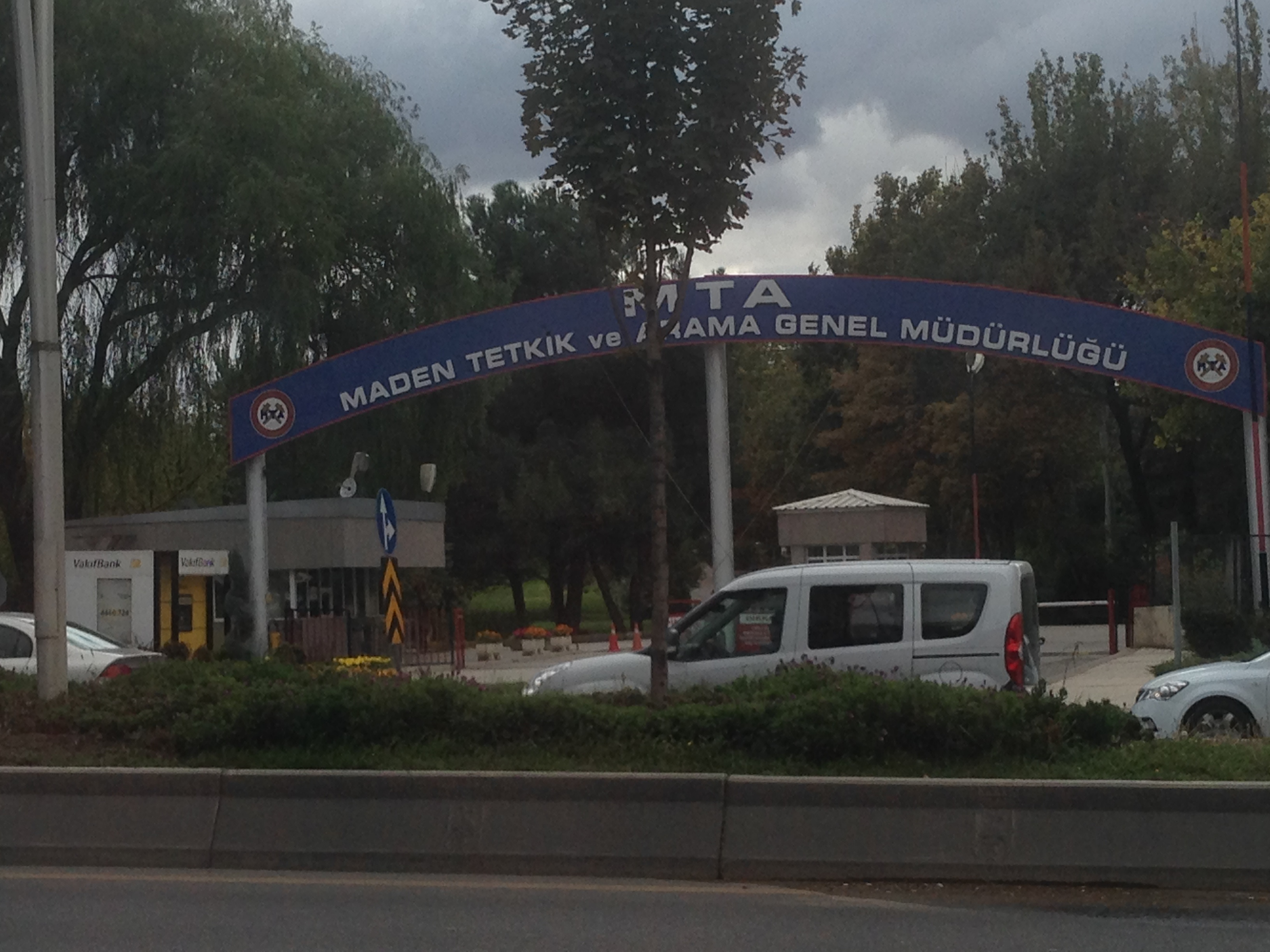
Türkiye Maden Tetkik ve Arama Genel Müdürlüğü Binası, Ankara

The General Directorate of Mineral Research & Exploration of Turkey (Turkish: Maden Tetkik ve Arama Genel Müdürlüğü, commonly known as MTA) is a scientific institution established by the Ministry of Energy and Natural Resources in 1935.

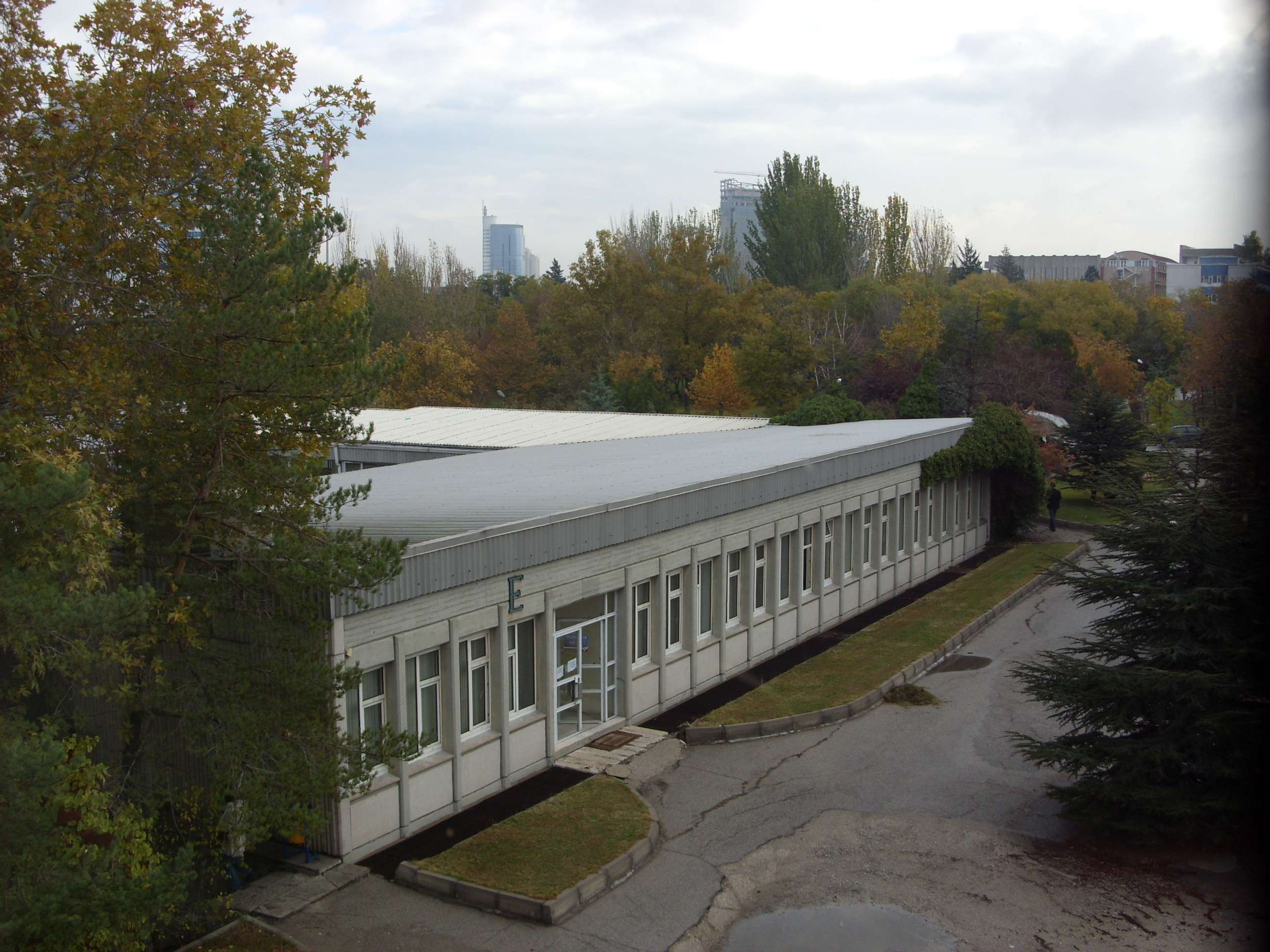
General Directorate of Mineral Research and Exploration Building E in Ankara.

MTA conducts geological and geophysical surveys all around Turkey in order to explore natural resources, like ore deposits and energy raw materials. The institution has 6 divisions with many different analysis labs, and a training facility for geologists and geophysical engineers in Ankara. Apart from focusing on fieldwork for mining research, MTA also has remote sensing facilities since 1975. Remote sensing unit operates under MTA Geophysics Research Division and TUBITAK has a cooperation since early 1970s.

MTA publishes Bulletin of the Mineral Research and Exploration twice a year since 1936. Papers are published in English and Turkish since 1950 and distributed worldwide.

== See also ==
- RV MTA Oruç Reis
- RV MTA Sismik 1
- RV MTA Selen
- RV MTA Turkuaz
