= Russian occupations of Beirut =

Part of the Russo-Turkish War, 1772–1774

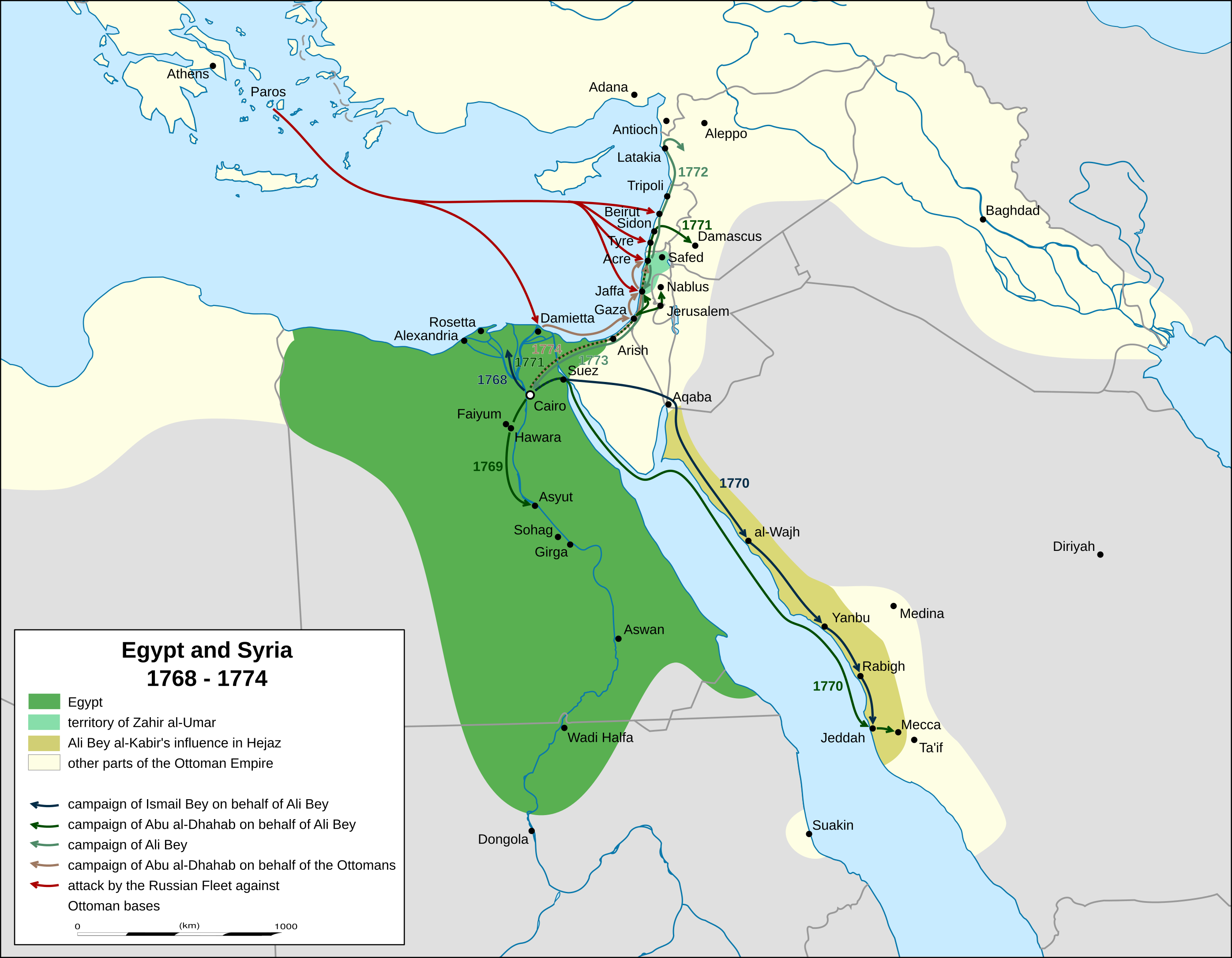
Extent of Ali Bey and Daher's territory between 1768 and 1774 and Russian naval movements in the Levant, based on the accounts of Sauveur Lusignan, a contemporary historian

Beirut was occupied twice during the Russo-Turkish War of 1768–1774 by squadrons of the Imperial Russian Navy's Mediterranean Fleet, first in June 1772 and second from October 1773 to early 1774, as part of its Levant campaign. Russia's main objective in this campaign was to assist local forces led by Egypt's autonomous ruler, Ali Bey al-Kabir, who was in open rebellion against the Ottoman Empire.

Russia, led by Catherine the Great, was pressing the Ottomans in Europe. Ali took advantage of the Empire's preoccupation with Russia to declare Egypt's independence; in 1771 he sent an army led by Muhammad Bey Abu al-Dhahab to occupy Ottoman territory in the Levant. Abu al-Dhahab unexpectedly returned to challenge Ali for control of Egypt. Ali requested Russian military assistance against both his rival and the Ottomans. When this aid, in the form of a small Russian squadron, arrived in the region, Ali had already fled Egypt and taken refuge in Acre, the power base of his ally, Daher al-Umar. After helping repel an Ottoman offensive on Sidon, the Russian squadron sailed for Beirut. They bombarded the town in June 1772 and occupied it from 23 to 28 June.

Ali requested further assistance from Russia to recover Egypt from Abu al-Dhahab. The Russians had recently entered a period of truce with the Ottomans, constraining their involvement in the region. They did, however, promise Ali a large squadron. Impatient, Ali set out for Egypt with a small force that was defeated near Cairo; he was imprisoned and died a few days later. When the Russian squadron arrived in June 1773 and learned of Ali's fate, its commander allied with Daher and the Druze chieftain Yusuf Shihab. The latter had agreed to pay the Russians a tribute in exchange for their liberation of Beirut from Jazzar Pasha, Shihab's insubordinate vassal whom he had recently appointed as governor of the town. The bombardment of the town began on 2 August, and Jazzar surrendered after two months, on October 10. A few hundred Albanian mercenaries were left as occupiers.

The occupations are of debatable historical importance. Despite their brevity, they marked the first time in over 250 years that Beirut was ruled by a power other than the Ottomans. It also marked the first occasion on which Russian rule was imposed over an Arab city.

== Background ==
The pressure of Austria and Russia on the northern Ottoman frontiers since the beginning of the 18th century had encouraged insubordination among local governors in the largely decentralised Arab provinces of Ottoman Syria. In 1768, while the Russian Empire was suppressing a Polish uprising near the Ottoman border, a Cossack regiment chased some of the rebels across the border and reportedly carried out a massacre in the town of Balta. The Sultan eventually responded by declaring war on Russia. He demanded military assistance from Ali Bey, a Mamluk, who was the most powerful official in Ottoman Egypt at the time. Ali closely observed the course of the war, sending the required 3,000 soldiers to the aid of the Sublime Porte in 1769. Early in the following year, however, he declared Egypt's independence, chiefly in response to the war with Russia. Later he struck an alliance with Daher al-Umar, a wealthy Arab ruler in northern Palestine. Ali and Daher shared common ground in their opposition to Islamic fundamentalism, the Sultan's isolationist policies towards Europe and the imposition of Ottoman dignitaries to their courts.

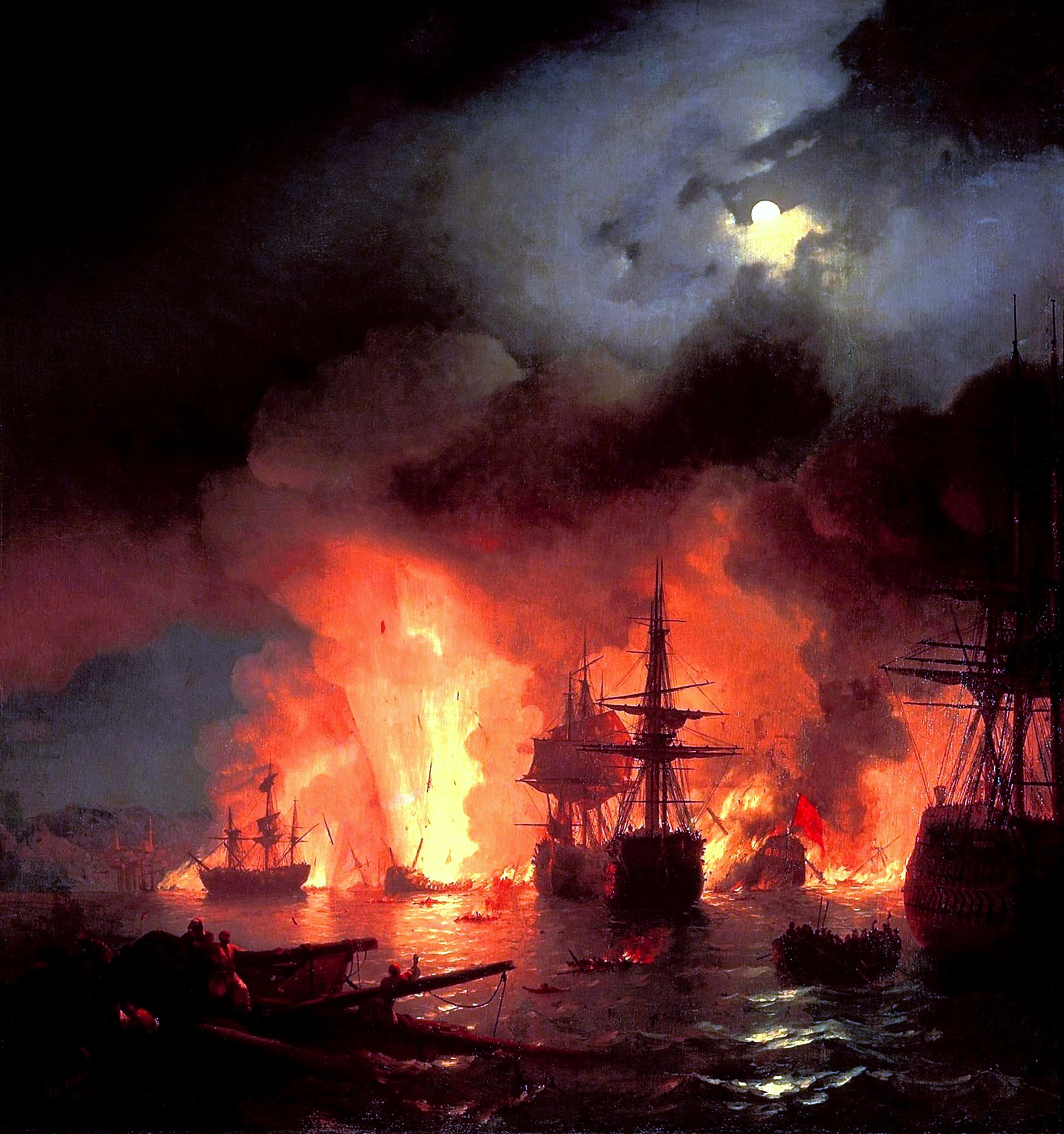
Battle of Çesme at Night by Ivan Aivazovsky (1848) (Note: Çeşme is sometimes spelled "Chesma" or "Chesme".)

At the same time, Tsarina Catherine the Great, lacking an organised Russian fleet in the Black Sea, drew up plans with Count Alexei Grigoryevich Orlov to detach a large number of ships from the Baltic Fleet and deploy them to the Mediterranean. Russia hoped they would attack the Turkish Straits from the rear, and that its naval presence in the Aegean Sea would provoke a Greek rebellion. This newly formed Mediterranean Fleet, headed by Orlov and commanded by Admiral Grigory Spiridov, sailed from Copenhagen on September 23, 1769. By 1 March 1770, the first detachment was anchored off the southern Morea, where the Orlov revolt broke out. This was followed by bombardments and troop landings at different locations in the region over the coming months. On 7 July, a Turkish fleet was crushed at the Battle of Chesma, which crippled the Ottoman Navy and gave the Russians naval command of the Mediterranean for the remainder of the war. Turkish ships that survived retreated to the Dardanelles. Rear Admiral John Elphinstone proposed a direct assault on Constantinople, but was instead convinced by Orlov to blockade the straits with his squadron, while the rest of the fleet went on the offensive in the northern Aegean.

Russian chronicles have described Muslims as Hagarians since the 15th century. This is a pejorative term suggesting that they were the descendants of biblical Hagar who was exiled into the deserts of Sinai. The Russian court was aware of the autonomization of Ottoman Tunis, Algeria, and Tripolitania in the 18th century. Despite her negative perception of Muslims, Catherine did not hesitate to approach them as potential allies. On 15 July 1769, she instructed Spiridov to avoid attacking ships belonging to the aforementioned states unless provoked, and prompted him to attempt to turn the Barbary states against their Ottoman overlord. Catherine's plans did not materialize as Tunis and Algeria fought on the side of the Ottomans, while the correspondence of Ali Pasha of Tripoli with Orlov bore no significant results.

In late 1770, Ali Bey dispatched an army of 40,000 troops, commanded by his trusted general Muhammad Bey Abu al-Dhahab, to Palestine where it joined forces with Daher's army in the spring of 1771 and went on to occupy several towns in the Levant. However, soon after the fall of Damascus in early June, Ottoman agents managed to convince Abu al-Dhahab to turn against Ali Bey, promising to appoint him as ruler of Egypt instead of his overlord. Abu al-Dhahab retreated with his army, and became embroiled in a power struggle against his former master over the control of Egypt. Daher, for his part, became isolated in his sheikhdom and had to face the inevitable Ottoman counteroffensive on his own. Ali Bey was then convinced that he could reverse his recent setbacks through an alliance with Russia. On 2 December 1771, he sent an Armenian envoy named Yaqub to meet with Orlov at the Mediterranean Fleet's headquarters on the Aegean island of Paros where he offered the Russians an alliance.

The offer was later accepted by the Tsarina, but her knowledge of the proposed alliance came after Ali Bey was no longer ruling Egypt. (Note: By the time Yaqub reached Paros, Orlov had been gone for four days on a mission to Livorno. Spiridov, who had been in charge there, told Ali's envoy that he was not at liberty to form an alliance. Yaqub then sailed to Livorno, where he met Orlov, after which he travelled all the way to Saint Petersburg to pass the message to Catherine herself.) He had been forced to leave the country and seek refuge with his ally Daher when the standoff between him and Abu al-Dhahab finally escalated to armed confrontations. Ignorant of Ali's flight and with orders from Orlov to make contact with him, a detachment commanded by General-Adjutant Rizo, a Greek, sailed for Damietta but quickly left port after learning of his fate. The squadron then searched for him along the Palestinian coast and eventually found him in Acre on 3 June. Rizo later sent a detachment to the north, which intercepted an Ottoman frigate from Beirut near Tyre. Meanwhile, in Sidon, Daher's small army of 6,000 was being besieged by an Ottoman force of 30,000 that included Druze contingents. Rizo's ships joined the garrison by bombarding the Ottoman attackers who withdrew shortly afterwards.

== First occupation ==
First bombardment of Beirut
Date	18 June 1772 – 23 June 1772
Location	Beirut
Result	Occupation of the town until 28 June

Belligerents
Imperial Russian Navy	Druze garrison

The newly assembled coalition, wishing to exploit the Ottoman setback in Sidon, decided to send the Russian squadron to the small port town of Beirut, which was controlled at the time by the Druze. According to the researcher William Persen, the aim of this expedition was to both preoccupy the Druze and punish them for siding with the Porte. Blockading their port would achieve this. Beirut was also the only port in the region which had so far remained under Ottoman rule.

Likely unaware of a recent armistice between Russia and the Porte, Rizo's squadron appeared off the town's coast on 18 June after it was reunited with its Tyre and Acre detachments. The force consisted of two frigates, the Sv. Nikolai and the Sv. Pavel, four polaccas, five half-galleys, and four xebecs. It was transporting an infantry division that was largely made up of Greek and Albanian mercenaries. Bombardment of the town began on the same day, and Ottoman ships docked in its port were sunk. In his version of the events, Auriant, author of Catherine II et l'Orient, wrote that Beirut's defenders were given a 24-hour ultimatum by Rizo to fly the Russian flag and pay a tribute. The naval offensive lasted five days and involved an unsuccessful assault by a landing party on 21 June. After two days of heavier bombardment, they finally landed on 23 June and spent hours sacking the town and its bazaar. About 550,000 qirsh worth of loot, in the form of both trade goods and cash, was taken. (Note: According to Lusignan, a certain Amir Mahamut was appointed by the Greek captain Anton Psaro, as governor of Beirut, in response to calls by members of the local Greek Orthodox community for greater protection in the face of their Druze overlords. Lusignan, however, also designates April as the month in which the events take place, contradicting other accounts of this occupation.) The Russians left on 28 June, after receiving additional payment from Yusuf Shihab, a Druze emir who ruled over the surrounding mountains. Shihab also agreed to a four-month alliance with the coalition.

== End of Ali Bey's revolt ==
Following the Russians' departure, the Ottomans ceded Beirut to Yusuf Shihab's Mount Lebanon Emirate. Shihab, in turn, charged Ahmed Bey Jazzar, who had previously served under Ali Bey, with the town's defence. While in Acre and with his allies bombarding Beirut, Ali received his envoy Yaqub. He came aboard a Russian frigate carrying gifts and a friendly message from Catherine in which she assured him of her commitment to Russia's alliance with the Egyptian ruler. Ali, however, was dissatisfied with the mere gesture and sought Russian military assistance in the form of infantry, artillery and naval support to reconquer Egypt from Abu al-Dhahab. He sent a new envoy with this message to Orlov. According to the historian Édouard Lockroy, he may have also offered the Russians control of the Christian holy sites in Jerusalem.

Orlov responded by telling Ali that he was bounded by the truce with the Porte. He pledged a small force of Russian officers and artillery, and promised to give Ali all the assistance he needed as soon as circumstances permitted. During the summer, Ali and Daher's forces laid siege to the city of Jaffa. The siege was joined in September by a Russian transport ship which landed artillery pieces near the city. The ship left a month later, carrying a renewed plea to Orlov. Another Russian naval detachment, commanded by Lieutenant Panaiotti Alexiano, arrived at Jaffa in November, again joining the bombardment and informing Ali of Orlov's plan to commission a large fleet for his cause. Alexiano's squadron consisted of the frigate Sv. Pavel and a number of polaccas, and had earlier destroyed two Barbary ships off Damietta and captured some smaller vessels.

Planted rumours of insubordination in Abu al-Dhahab's camp and growing dissent in Egypt had caught Ali's attention. He grew impatient and, in April 1773, he set out for Egypt at the head of a small force, despite being assured a month earlier that Russian assistance would arrive soon. Ali's force was defeated by his rival's army near Cairo. He was taken prisoner and died a few days later, likely by poisoning. Jazzar, meanwhile, had fortified Beirut and chose to act independently of Shihab, declaring that he would recognise only the Sultan's authority over the town. Orlov's promised squadron, commanded by Captain Mikhail Gavrilovich Kozhukhov, reached Acre in June. Hearing of Ali's death, Kozhukhov agreed to a "treaty of friendship" with Daher.

== Second occupation ==
Kozhukhov appeared with his squadron of at least 222 guns off Beirut's coast on 6 July, carrying a force of 1,200 Albanian mercenaries and mobile artillery units. Daher had already negotiated an alliance with Shihab, when the latter was denied assistance by the Pasha of Damascus against Jazzar. During the month-long negotiations that followed, the Druze emir managed to persuade Kozhukhov, through Daher and his uncle Amir Musa Mansur, to deliver Beirut to him. Shihab was to pay a tribute of 300,000 qirsh and place the town under Russian protection. On his part, Kozhukhov promised that his troops would not pillage the town as the Russian occupiers of 1772 had. Both sides agreed that the Russians would hold Mansur as a hostage, pending full payment by Shihab.

Order of battle

By the time it appeared before Beirut, Kozhukhov's squadron consisted of the following ships:

Ship	Type	Guns
Nadezhda (Kozhukhov)	Frigate	32
Sv. Pavel	Frigate	26
Sv. Nikolai	Frigate	26
Naksia	Frigate	22
Slava	Frigate	16
Sv. Aleksii	Polacca	20
Sv. Anna	Polacca	20
Sv. Ekaterina	Polacca	18
Sniks	Polacca	12
Zabiaka	Schooner	18
Six half-galleys

Second bombardment of Beirut
Date	2 August 1773 – 10 October 1773
Location	Beirut
Result	Occupation of the town until late January or early February 1774

Belligerents
Imperial Russian Navy; Shihab's forces Daher's forces	Jazzar's garrison

A bombardment began on 2 August and lasted the entire day, destroying the port area and its towers. The noise was so loud it could be heard in Sidon, about 25 miles (40 km) away, according to the city's French consul. Arabic sources said that it could even be heard in Damascus. Much of Beirut was destroyed, but Jazzar refused to surrender. Kozhukhov ordered the landing of troops and artillery units for a ground assault. The walls were breached in several places but Shihab would not commit his forces to storming the town, citing the agreement which gave Kozhukhov the task of delivering the town to the Druze in exchange for payment. Kozhukhov chose to maintain the naval and land blockade, cutting off the town from its food supply. Shihab and Daher's troops routed an Ottoman relief army commanded by the Pasha of Tripoli which approached from the Beqaa.

Jazzar opened negotiations with the attackers at the end of September. Fearing that submission to either Shihab or Kozhukhov would eventually lead to his execution, he offered to surrender himself to Daher instead and serve under his command. Jazzar surrendered Beirut on 10 October, after which he left for Acre with his garrison of 800 Maghrebis. By the end of their offensive, the Russians had lost 34 men killed and 96 wounded. Kozhukhov restricted himself to seizing two half-galleys and some weaponry after docking, in accordance with his arrangement with Shihab. When the latter could not pay the full amount promised to the Russians, Kozhukhov threatened to kill Mansur, his Druze hostage. Shihab managed to make a partial payment, which Kozhukhov accepted, pending payment of the balance. The Russian commander and his squadron departed for the Aegean, leaving behind 300 Albanian mercenaries to guard Mansur, who was under house arrest, and to remain in the town as occupiers.

The Albanians occupied Beirut until late January or early February 1774, though it remains unclear whether they received the balance of the tribute due. (Note: Some Arab chroniclers, such as Tannus al-Shidyaq, wrote that the Russians were fully repaid. On the other hand, Paul Masson, author of Histoire du commerce français dans le Levant au XVIIIe siècle, wrote that "100 purses" were never paid.) According to French consular reports from Sidon, the occupiers kept the Russian flag raised over Beirut, along with a large portrait of Catherine the Great over the town's main gate, to which travellers were forced to pay their respects.

== Aftermath and legacy ==
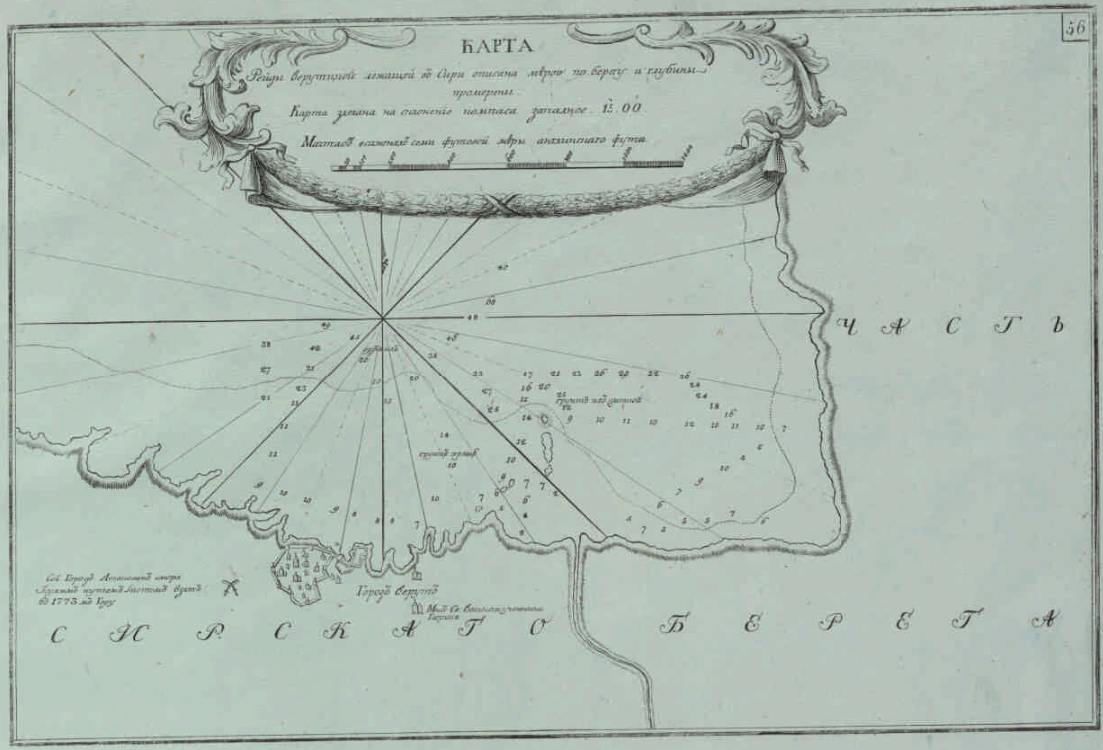
A map of Beirut from the Atlas of the Archipelago, printed in 1788

Jazzar and his Maghrebi mercenaries defected from Daher's camp to the Ottomans shortly after surrendering Beirut. With the departure of the Russians in early 1774 and the signing of the Treaty of Küçük Kaynarca the same year, Daher had to face the Porte's retribution by himself. The Russo-Turkish peace treaty allowed Russia to establish consulates wherever it wished in the Mediterranean, to open up trade routes with the Middle East, and to guarantee the safety of Christian pilgrims in the Holy Land, but made no mention of Daher or of Russia's wartime territorial gains in the region. Daher was killed in August 1775 during a siege of Acre by Ottoman forces, who were initially led by Egypt's Abu al-Dhahab. Shihab was quickly pardoned by the Ottomans, as he was never in direct rebellion against them. But he was pressured into surrendering Beirut in 1776 due to heavy taxation by Jazzar, who had been recently appointed by the Ottoman government as the Pasha of Sidon.

In addition to being the first time an Arab city came under Russian rule, the events also marked the first time that Beirut had not been under Ottoman control since the Ottoman conquest of the region over two and a half centuries earlier. "Place des Canons" ("Cannons Square") became the common name for today's Martyrs' Square in Beirut's Central District in 1773. This name remained in use, though unofficially, until the 1950s. It was a reference to the large artillery pieces that the Russians stationed in the plaza, which was then an empty area known as the Bourj, east of the walled town.

The importance of this short-lived occupation remains a subject of debate among the relatively few historians and scholars who have analysed it. In his 1952 evaluation of the events, William Persen played down the occupation, describing it simply as a "new force of Western penetration in the Middle East." Soviet scholars like P. Perminov, on the other hand, described it as an early manifestation of modern Cold War-era assistance by the Soviet Union to national liberation movements in Third World nations.

== Sources ==
- Anderson, R. C. (1952). Naval Wars in the Levant 1559–1853. Princeton: Princeton University Press.
- Gallant, Thomas W. (2015). The Edinburgh History of the Greeks, 1768 to 1913: The Long Nineteenth Century. Edinburgh University Press. ISBN 978-0-7486-3605-1.
- Harris, William; Harris, William W. (2014). Lebanon: A History, 600–2011. Oxford University Press. ISBN 978-0-19-021783-9.
- Khalaf, Samir (2013). Heart of Beirut: Reclaiming the Bourj. Saqi. ISBN 978-0-86356-590-8.
- Mariti, Giovanni (1774). Istoria della guerra accesa nella Soría l'anno 1771: Dalle armi di Aly-Bey dell' Egitto e continovazione del successo a detto Aly-Bey fino a quest' anno 1772, Volume 2 [History of the war in Syria in the year 1771: From the arms of Aly-Bey of Egypt and the further successes of the aforementioned Aly-Bey to the present year of 1772, Volume 2]. Stamperia Allegrini, Pisoni, e Comp.
- Persen, William (1955). "The Russian occupations of Beirut, 1772–74". Journal of the Royal Central Asian Society. 42 (3–4): 275–286. doi:10.1080/03068375508731555.
- Philipp, Thomas (2001). Acre: The Rise and Fall of a Palestinian City, 1730–1831. Columbia University Press. ISBN 978-0-231-12327-3.
- du Quenoy, Paul (2014). "Arabs under Tsarist Rule: The Russian Occupation of Beirut, 1773–1774". Russian History. 41 (2): 128–141. doi:10.1163/18763316-04102002.
- Sicker, Martin (2001). The Islamic World in Decline: From the Treaty of Karlowitz to the Disintegration of the Ottoman Empire. Greenwood Publishing Group. ISBN 978-0-275-96891-5.
- Smilianskaya, Irina; Velizhev, Michael; Smilianskaya, Elena (2011). Россия в Средиземноморье. Архипелагская экспедиция Екатерины Великой [Russia in the Mediterranean. The Archipelago expedition of Catherine the Great] (in Russian). Moscow: Indrik. ISBN 978-5-91674-129-2.
- Solov'ev, Sergeĭ M. (1991). The Rule of Catherine the Great: War, Diplomacy and Domestic Affairs, 1772–1774. Academic International Press. ISBN 978-0-87569-122-0.
