= Orta, Tuzla =

Orta
- Neighbourhood
- Location in Turkey Orta (Istanbul)
- Coordinates: 40°54′8.38″N 29°22′40.91″E
- Country: Turkey
- Province: Istanbul
- District: Tuzla
- Time zone: UTC+3 (TRT)

Orta is a neighbourhood of the municipality and district of Tuzla, Istanbul Province, Turkey.
