= Aydıntepe, Tuzla =

Neighborhood in Tuzla district, Istanbul, Turkey

Aydıntepe is a neighborhood in the Tuzla District on the Anatolian side of Istanbul, Turkey. Its population is 16,195 (2016).

== Location ==
Aydıntepe is bordered on the north by the Esenyalı, Fatih, and Ahmet Yesevi neighborhoods of Pendik and the Aydınlı neighborhood of Tuzla; on the southeast by the Aydınlı, İçmeler, and Evliya Çelebi neighborhoods of Tuzla, and on the west by the Sea of Marmara and the Güzelyalı neighborhood of Pendik.
