= Mediterranean Fleet (Russian Empire) =

The Mediterranean Fleet (Russian: Средиземноморский флот) was a short-lived fleet of the Imperial Russian Navy in the Mediterranean Sea, active during the Russo-Turkish War of 1768–1774.

It was established on September 23, 1769, under Tsarina Catherine the Great and Count Alexei Grigoryevich Orlov as part of the Imperial Russian Navy. It was created during the Russo-Turkish War (1768–1774). As the Imperial Russia Navy lacked an organised fleet in the Black Sea, it was planned for this new fleet to be sent from the Baltic Sea to the Mediterranean. This newly formed fleet was headed by Orlov and commanded by Admiral Grigory Spiridov. It participated in the Battle of Chesma, the Russian occupations of Beirut and some other engagements. The fleet was eventually disbanded following the conclusion of the war and the signing of the Treaty of Küçük Kaynarca, with some elements later being transferred as part of the Imperial Russian Black Sea Fleet.

== Background ==
=== Improvement of the Imperial Russian Navy ===
From Catherine's coronation in 1762 and even before that, the Imperial Russian Navy was poor in discipline, training and morale, unskillful and badly administered and equipped. The Tsarina was forced to improve its efficiency from the early days of her reign, hoping to create a proper command structure and a navy, capable of challenging Great Powers on the seas. She had sought British help, with many Russian officers going to Britain to receive training. Catherine had also gotten a stroke of luck, as the Treaty of Paris (1763) had been signed just one year later leaving many British naval officers unemployed, many of whom joined the Russians. The most notable of these were the Scots John Elphinstone and Samuel Greig. This collaboration with Britain had helped bolster the Imperial Russian Navy and improved trade relations between the Russian Empire and the British Empire. It was also due to these improvements that the Imperial Russian Navy was able to be a proper force, capable of efficient naval warfare against other nations.

=== Outbreak of Russo-Turkish War ===
Main Article: Russo-Turkish War (1768–1774)#Background

The Russo-Turkish war began, as tensions between the Russian Empire against the Bar Confederation began, in order to seize control of Poland–Lithuania. When the Russian Empire managed to seize control of the town of Bar, members of the Confederation fled to the Ottoman Empire, who agreed to help them against Russia. The outbreak of this war made Russia realize that its navy was incapable of action against the Ottomans in the Mediterranean Sea or the Black Sea, henceforth forcing the Russian government into creating the Mediterranean Fleet.

== Creation ==
Ensign of the Imperial Russian Navy

The Mediterranean Fleet was created on September 23, 1769, by Tsarina Catherine the Great and Count Alexei Grigoryevich Orlov as part of the Imperial Russian Navy. It used up elements of the Imperial Russian Baltic Fleet. Command of the fleet was given to the Russian admiral Grigory Spiridov. The main goal of the fleet was to incite a rebellion in Ottoman Greece and attack the Turkish Straits from the rear. The fleet was made up of many squadrons and consisted of 9 ships of the line, 3 frigates, 4 fireships, 1 bombship, 1 dispatch vessel, 3 armed merchantman and 1 supply ship. The ships of the line were the Evropa, Sviatoi Evstafii, Tri Svyatitelya, Sviatoi Ianuarii, Tri Ierarcha, Rostislav, Ne Tron Menya, Svyatoslav and Saratov. The other ships were the Grom (Bomb ship), Sv. Nikolai (Frigate), Afrika (Frigate), Nadezhda (Frigate), Sv. Pavel (Storage Ship), Potchtalyon (Dispatch Vessel), Graf Tchemyshev (Armed Merchantmen), Graf Panin (Armed Merchantmen), Graf Orlov (Armed Merchantmen) and four unnamed fire ships. The fleet sailed from Copenhagen on September 23, 1769. It sailed through the Danish Straits, the English Channel and the Strait of Gibraltar until finally, on March 1, 1770, the first detachment was anchored off the southern Morea, where the Orlov revolt broke out almost immediately after, in response to this. It was also the first time in history a Russian naval fleet entered the Mediterranean.

== Battle of Chesme ==
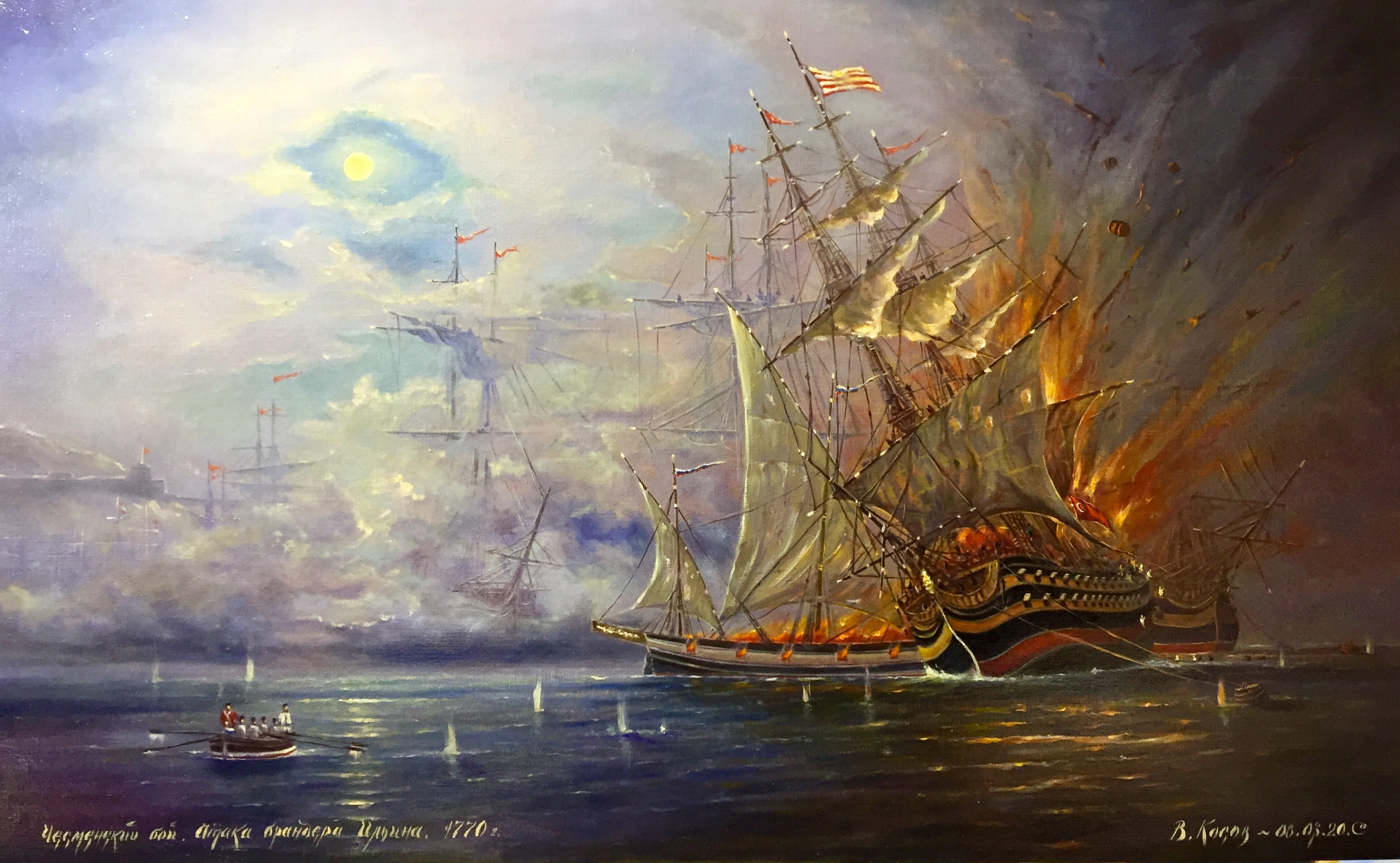
Battle of Chesme, 1770

The naval Battle of Chesme took place on 5–7 July 1770 during the Russo-Turkish War (1768–1774) near and in Çeşme (Chesme or Chesma) Bay. The Russian Mediterranean Fleet faced off against an Ottoman Fleet larger albeit it more disorganized than the Russians. The naval battle at Chesme first consisted of the Russians sailing into the Bay of Chesme, one ship at a time, in an attempt to completely annihilate the Ottoman forces there. The first shots were fired by the Ottomans, followed in quick succession by the Russians at around 11:45 AM on the 5th of July. Following 2 days of constant fighting, the Russians came out victorious and were able to cause massive casualties on the Ottomans.

== Occupations of Beirut ==
The occupations of Beirut by the Russian Empire were two military expeditions by squadrons of the Imperial Russian Navy's Mediterranean Fleet, with the first one taking place in June 1772 and the second one from October 1773 to early 1774. They formed part of its Levant campaign during the larger Russo-Turkish War of 1768–1774. Russian forces were able to capture the port city twice, once on 18 June 1772 – 23 June 1772 and then on 2 August 1773- 10 October 1773. It ended with the signing of the treaty of Treaty of Küçük Kaynarca.
