= RV MTA Selen =

Turkish research vessel

History

Turkey
- Name: MTA Selen
- Owner: General Directorate of Mineral Research and Exploration (MTA)
- Operator: Geophysical Directorate
- Launched: 2010
- Commissioned: January 2011
- Homeport: Istanbul
- Identification: MMSI number: 271040349; Callsign: TCXS9
- Status: In active service

General characteristics
- Class & type: Geolphysical exploration ship
- Tonnage: 91.08 GT; 30.64 NT
- Length: 20 m (65 ft 7 in)
- Beam: 5.60 m (18 ft 4 in)
- Draft: 3.30 m (10 ft 10 in) (max.)
- Speed: 9 knots (17 km/h) (service)
- Armament: None

RV MTA Selen is a Turkish research vessel owned by the General Directorate of Mineral Research and Exploration (MTA) in Ankara and operated by its division of Geophysical Directorate for subsea geophysical exploration in shallow waters.

== Characteristics ==
MTA Selen is 20 m (65 ft 7 in) long, with a beam of 5.60 m (18 ft 4 in) and a max. draft of 3.30 m (10 ft 10 in). Assessed at 91.08 GT and 30.64 NT, the boat has a speed of 9 knots (17 km/h) in service. She was built in 2010 and commissioned in January 2011.

== See also ==
- RV MTA Sismik 1
- RV MTA Turkuaz
- List of research vessels of Turkey
