= Istanbul Technical University Faculty of Maritime =

ITU Maritime Faculty
- Type: Public school
- Established: 1884
- Dean: Prof. Dr. Özcan Arslan
- Location: Tuzla, Istanbul, Turkey
- Campus: Urban
- Website: df.itu.edu.tr

ITU Maritime Faculty (Turkish: İstanbul Teknik Üniversitesi, Denizcilik Fakültesi) is a faculty of the Istanbul Technical University in Turkey, which is dedicated to maritime science and technology.

The history of the faculty dates back to the "Merchant Navy Boarding School" (Turkish: Leyli Tüccar Kaptan Mektebi), which was established on December 5, 1884, at Heybeliada, Istanbul as a part of the Ottoman Naval Academy with the aim of strengthening civilian navigation and seamanship in the country. During the Republican era, it was renamed as the High Maritime School (Turkish: Yuksek Denizcilik Okulu) and continued its activities in the following decades. Finally, in 1992, it is reorganized as Faculty of Maritime and tied to the Istanbul Technical University.

The school has two departments:

- Department of Maritime, Transportation and Management Engineering
- Department of Ship Machinery and Management Engineering

The campus is located in Tuzla, Istanbul.

The school possesses three vessels for training purposes:

- RV MTA Sismik 1, a 1942 built decommissioned research vessel
- Hopa, a tugboat
- Martı, a ship's tender.
