= Mediterranean shearwater =

Mediterranean shearwater Puffinus mauretanicus sensu lato was the name used during the 1990s for what was then regarded as a polytypic species of Puffinus shearwater, but which is now regarded as two separate monotypic species:

- Balearic shearwater, Puffinus mauretanicus
- Yelkouan shearwater, Puffinus yelkouan
