= Mediterranean Squadron =

Mediterranean Squadron may refer to:

- Mediterranean Squadron (France) a former French Navy squadron
- Mediterranean Squadron (United Kingdom) a former Royal Navy squadron
- Mediterranean Squadron (United States) a former United States Navy squadron
- Mediterranean Division, a division of the Imperial German Navy
