= Tuzla, Istanbul =

Tuzla
- District and municipality
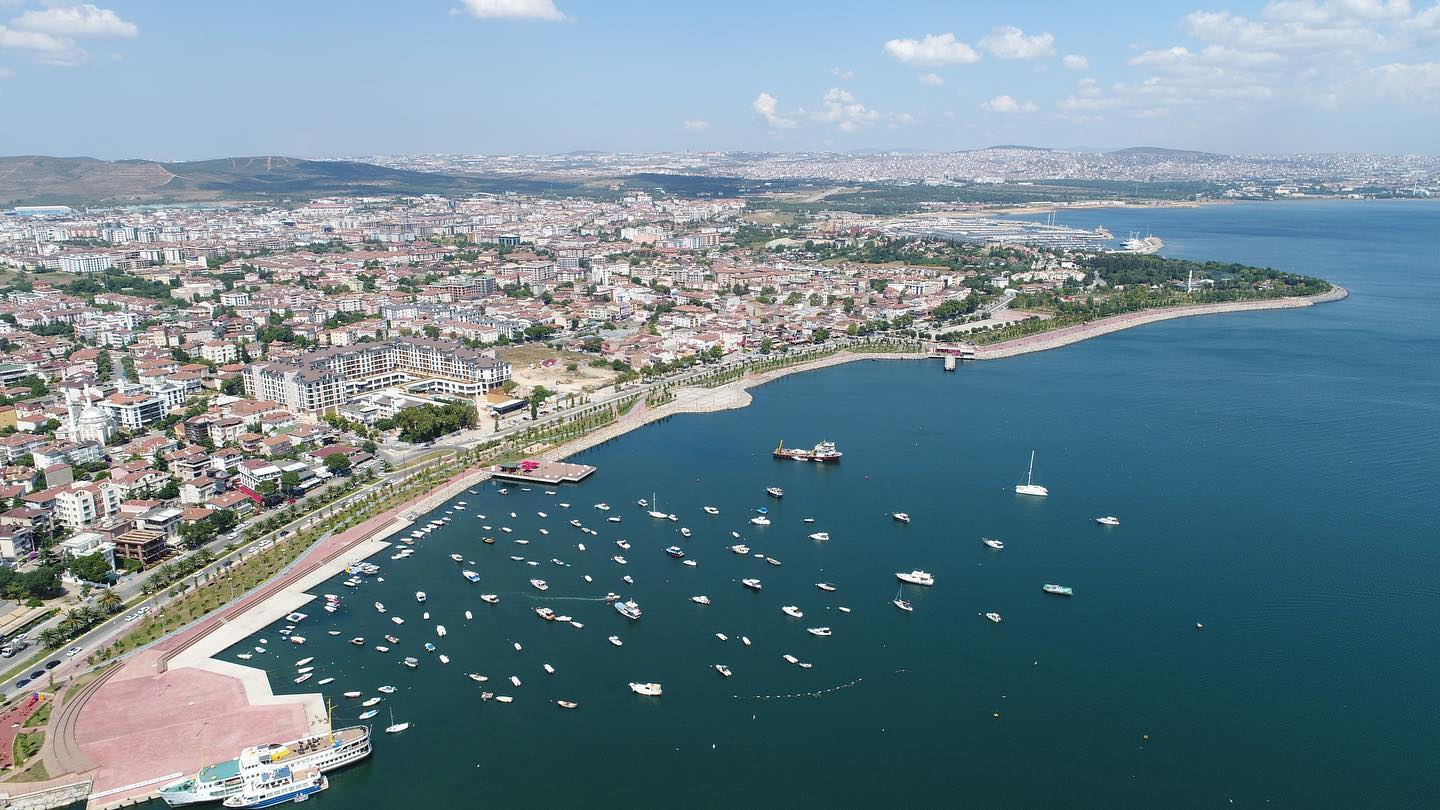

- Logo

- Map showing Tuzla District in Istanbul Province

- Location within Turkey Location within Istanbul
- Coordinates: 40°48′58″N 29°18′02″E
- Country: Turkey
- Province: Istanbul

Government
  - Mayor: Eren Ali Bingöl (AKP)
- Area: 138 km^{2} (53 sq mi)
- Population (2022): 288,878
  - Density: 2,090/km^{2} (5,420/sq mi)
- Time zone: UTC+3 (TRT)
- Area code: 0216
- Website: www.tuzla.bel.tr

Tuzla is a municipality and district of Istanbul Province, Turkey. It has a population of 288,878 (2022) and a land area of 138 km^{2} . It is on the Asian side of the city next to the municipality of Pendik. Tuzla is on a headland on the coast of Marmara Sea, at the eastern limit of the city. The mayor is Eren Ali Bingöl (AKP).

== History ==
The Greek name for the headland was Akritas (Ακρίτας). During the reign of the Ottoman Empire, a majority of inhabitants of Tuzla were Greek farmers and fishermen. The local Greek population of Tuzla was exchanged with the Turkish population of Salonica, Kavala and Drama during the population exchange between Greece and Turkey following the Treaty of Lausanne and the foundation of the Turkish Republic in 1923.

== Composition ==
There are 17 neighbourhoods in Tuzla District:

- Akfırat
- Anadolu
- Aydınlı
- Aydıntepe
- Cami
- Evliya Çelebi
- Fatih
- İçmeler
- İstasyon
- Mescit
- Mimar Sinan
- Orhanlı
- Orta
- Postane
- Şifa
- Tepeören
- Yayla

== Tuzla today ==
While fishing boats are still present in Tuzla today, by the end of the 1980s, fishing had been largely overtaken by industrial services, particularly shipbuilding; the shipyards of Tuzla remain active. Farming continues to be prevalent around the inland parts of Tuzla.

Tuzla is most well known for its seafront and its abundance of fish restaurants. It is also a popular location for wealthy or retired residents of Istanbul to move into houses that are further away from the cityside. Travelling to Kadıköy from Tuzla by public transport takes around 40 minutes to an hour, while the European side transit hubs of Eminönü and Beşiktaş are another 30 minutes away by ferry.

The local birdlife is primarily sustained by the wetland from the coast, which has since largely deteriorated due to the accelerating growth of the city as well as environmental product dumping by factories. To this day, environmental pollution remains a prevalent issue in Tuzla.

Frequent deaths of shipyard workers have become a common occurrence in Tuzla. This has led to criticism of the government for their lack of control of illegal employment and inaction in regards to companies and improving their working conditions. In February and March 2008, thousands of workers went on strike for better wages and conditions. The police intervened in the demonstrations, and 86 workers were taken into police custody, 15 of them injured.

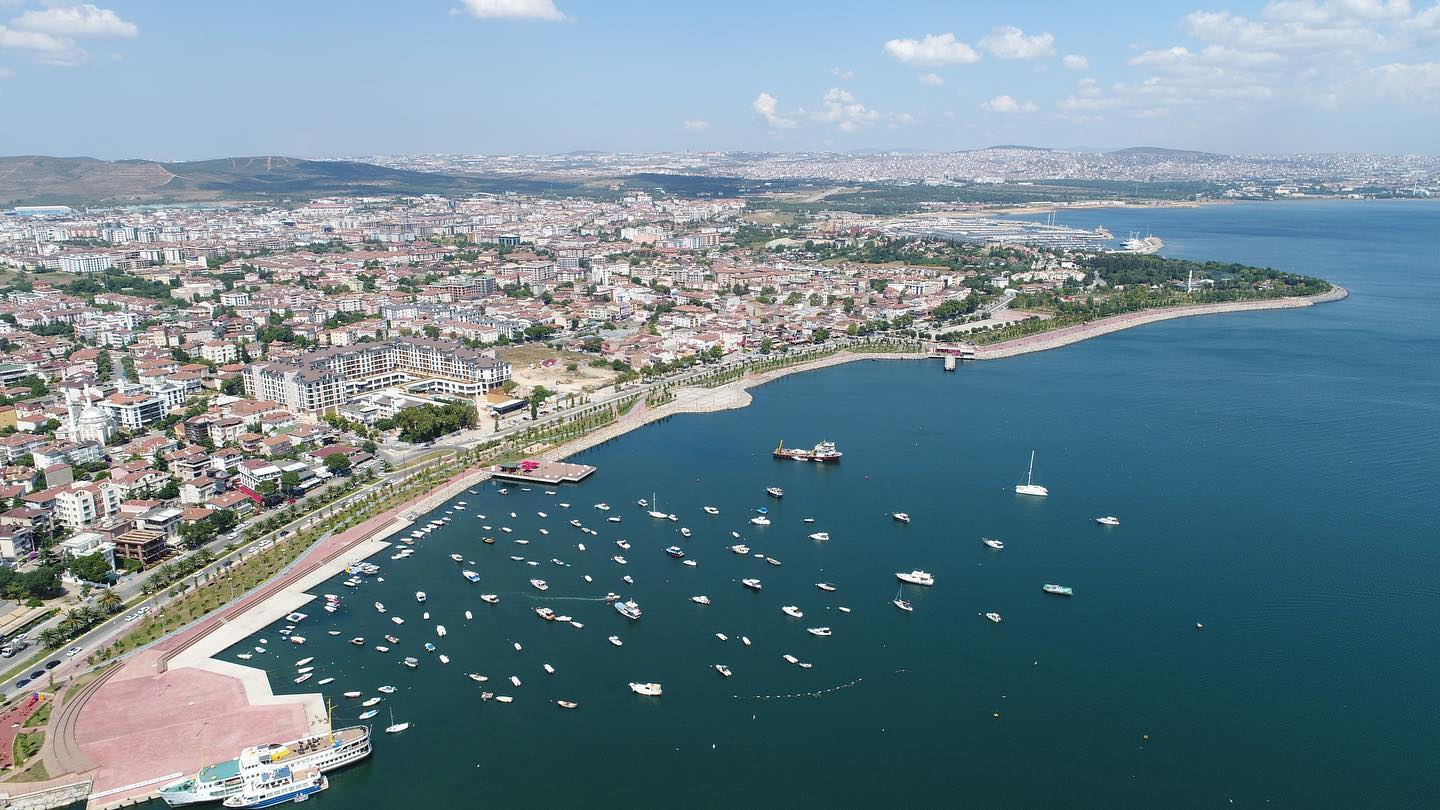
Tuzla

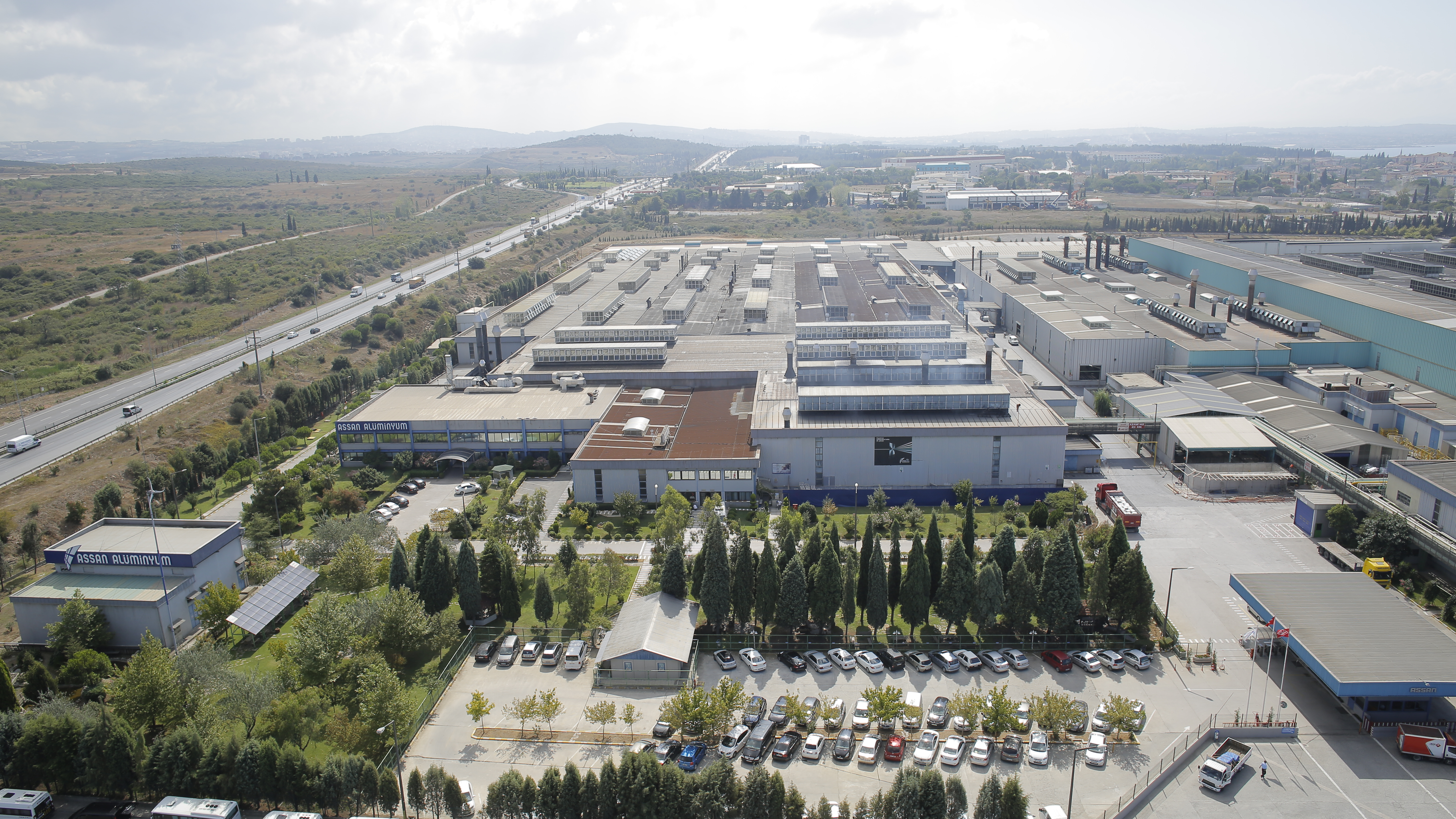
Tuzla Aluminum Factory

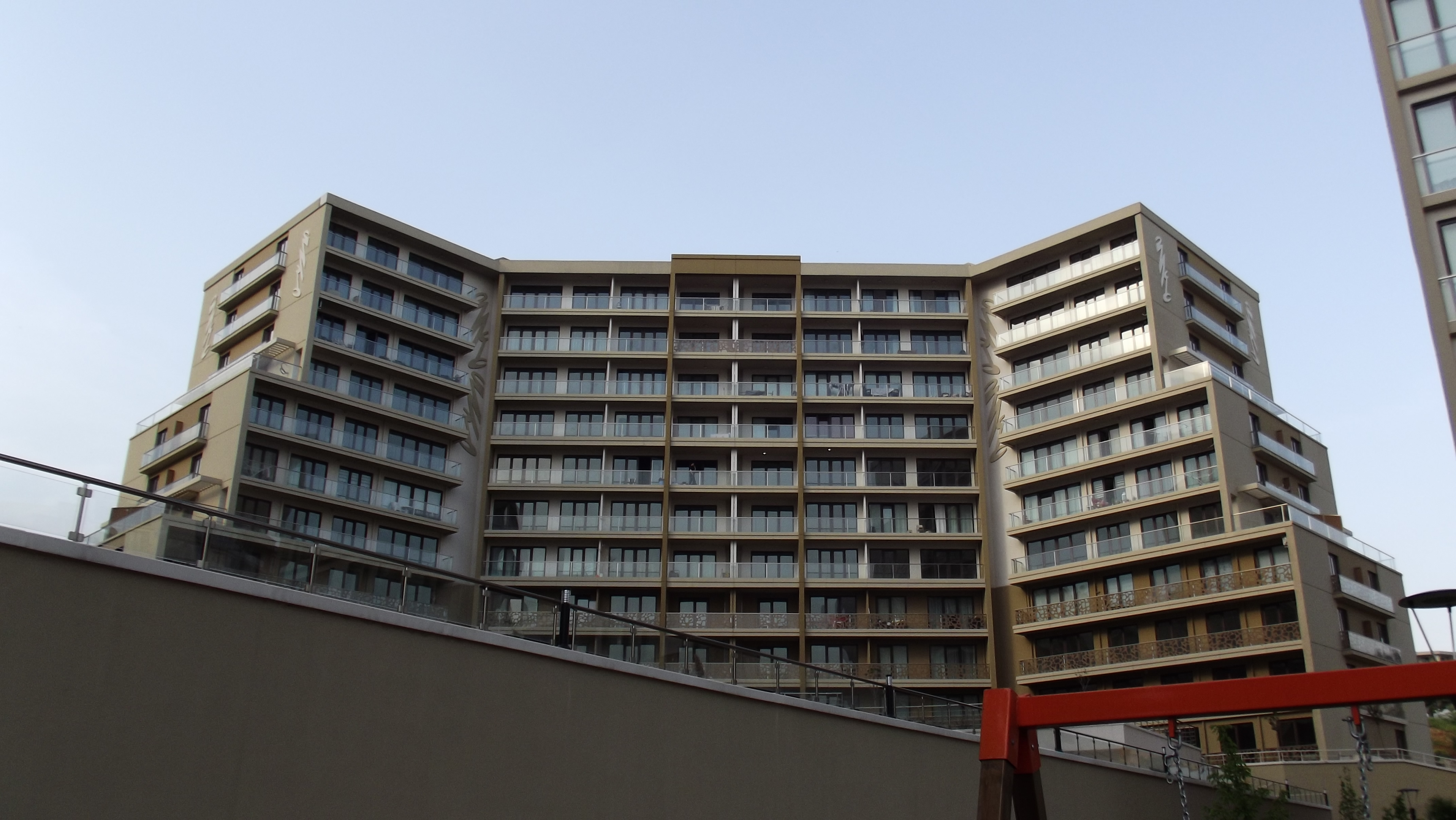
Residential building in Tuzla

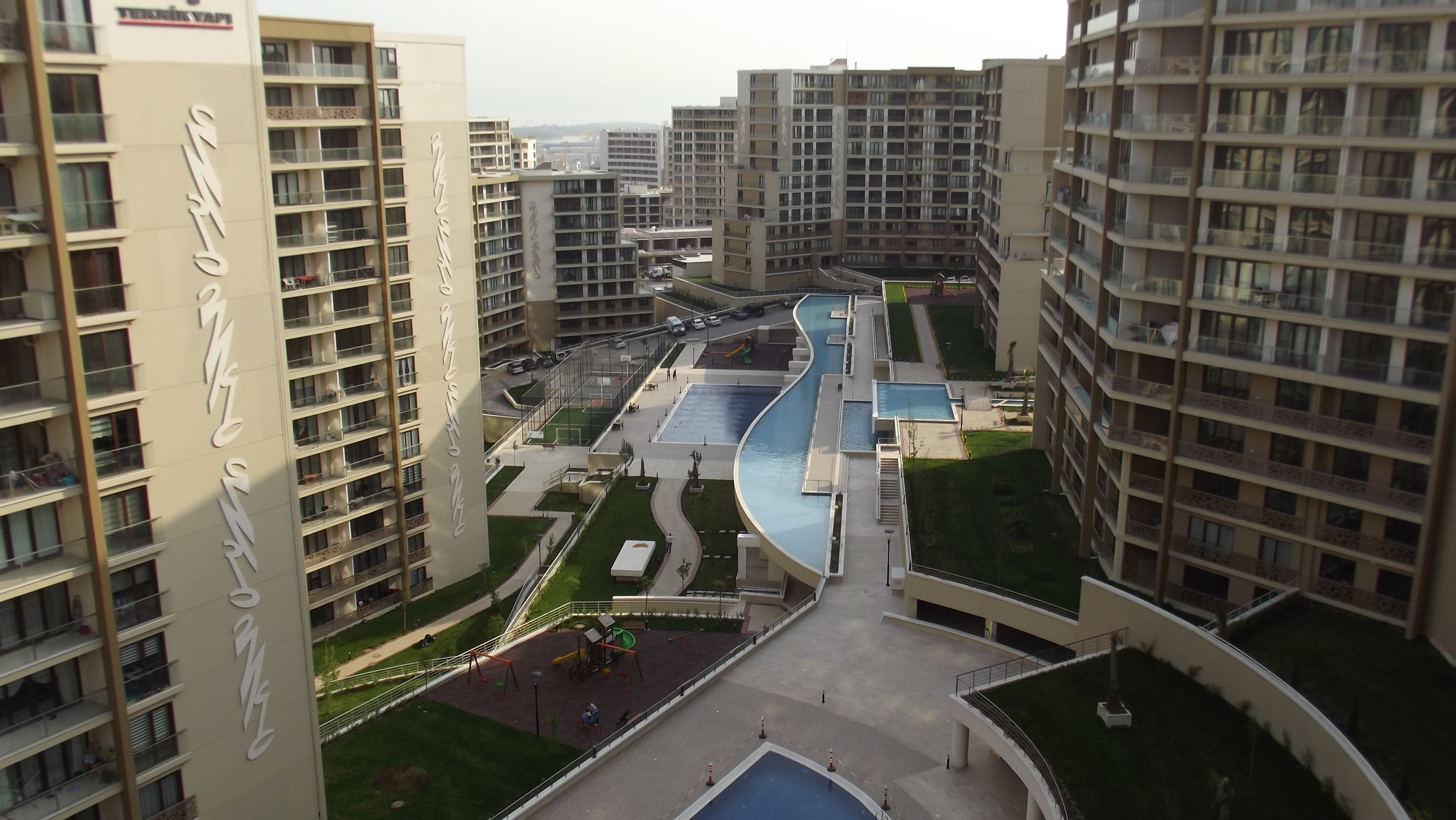
Residential buildings in Tuzla

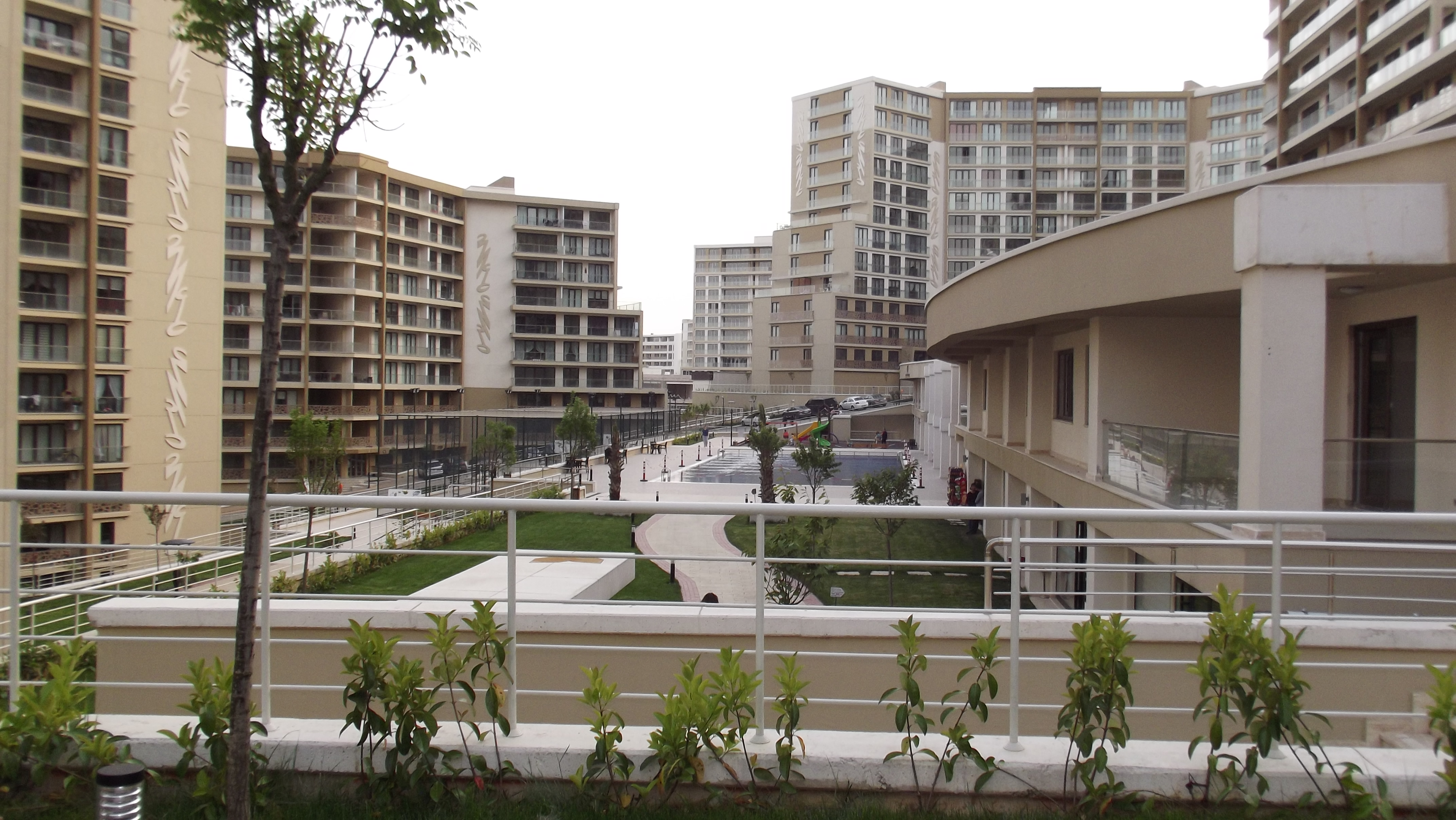
Residential buildings in Tuzla

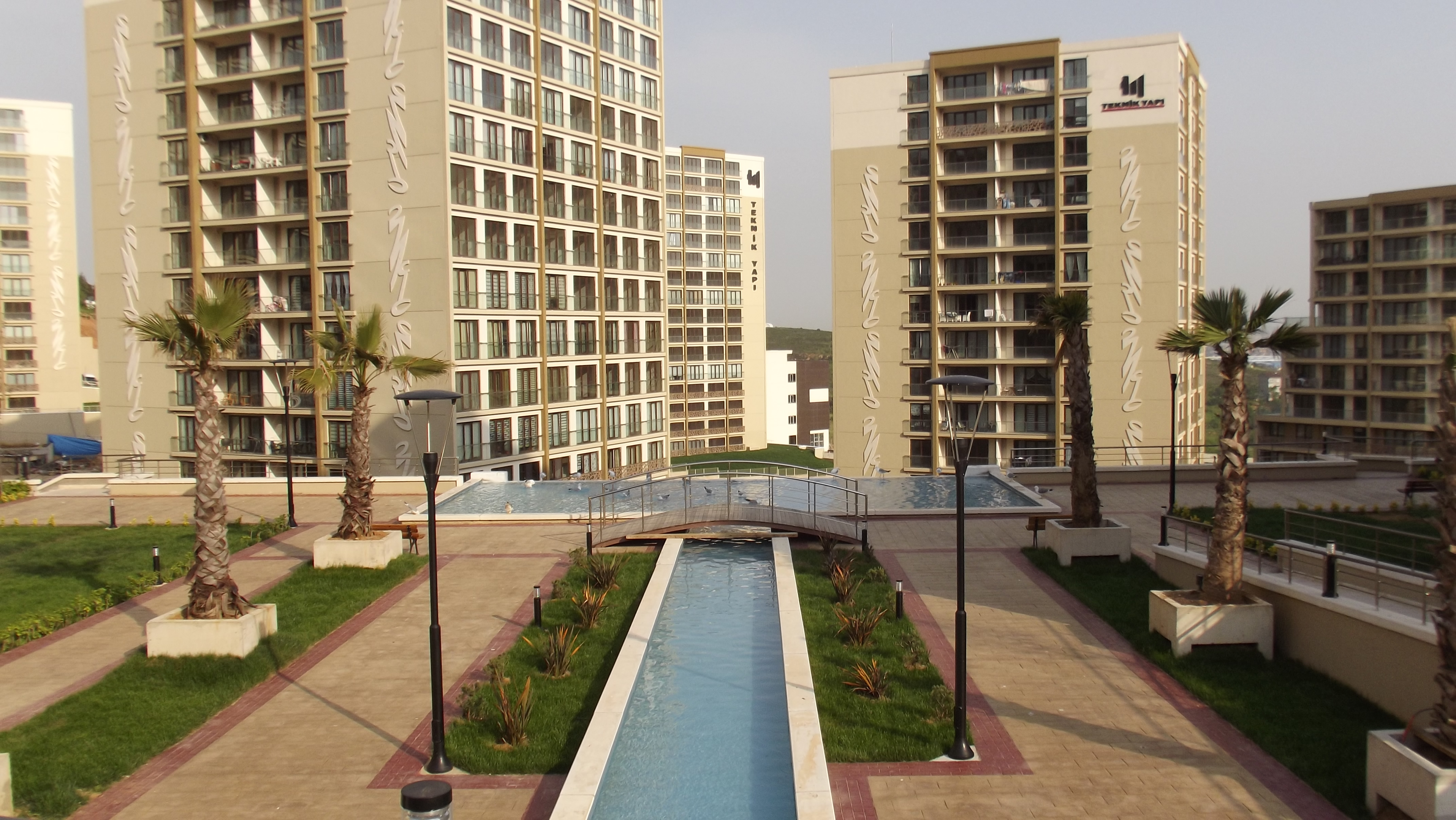
Residential buildings in Tuzla

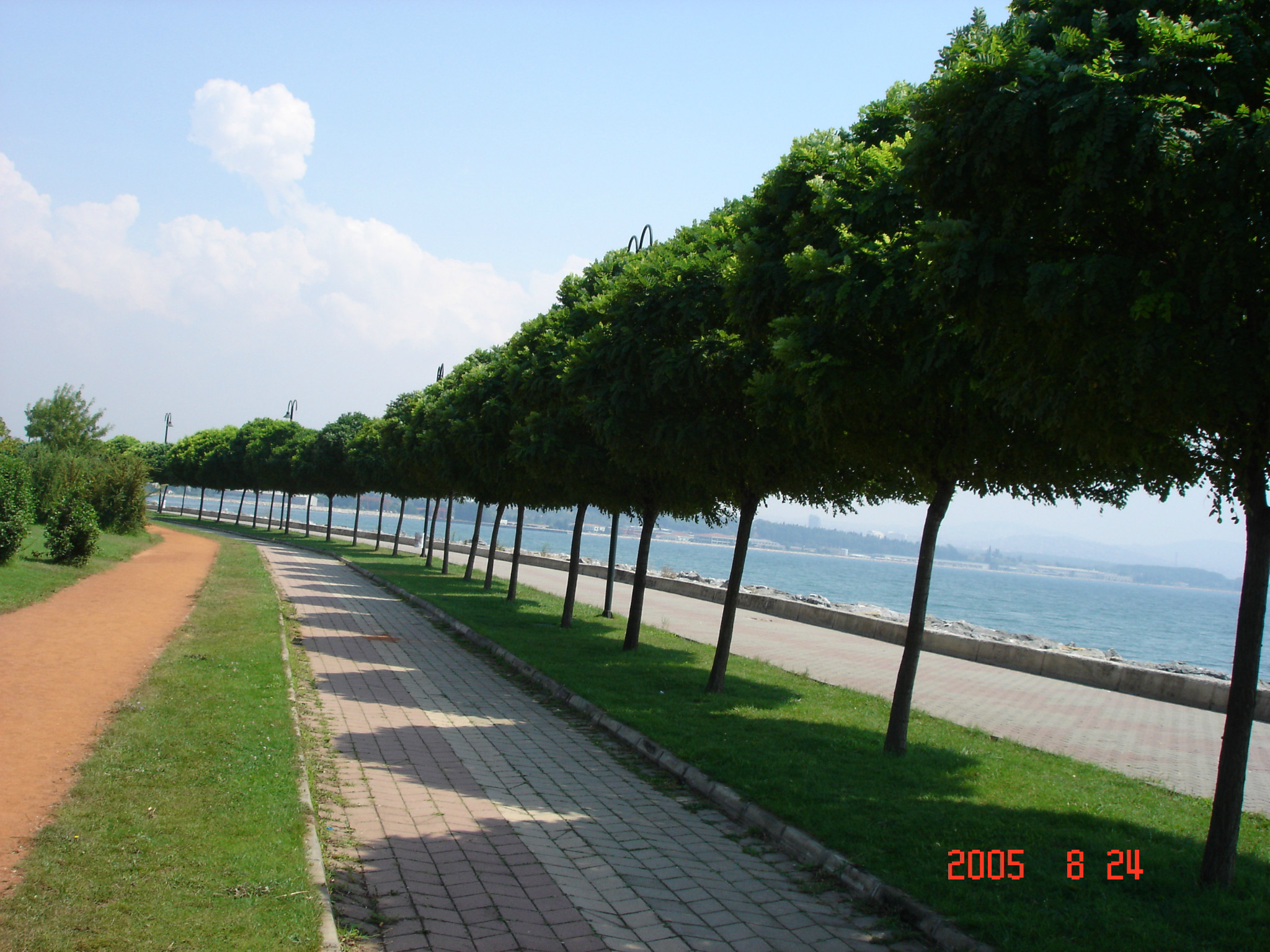
Tuzla coastline

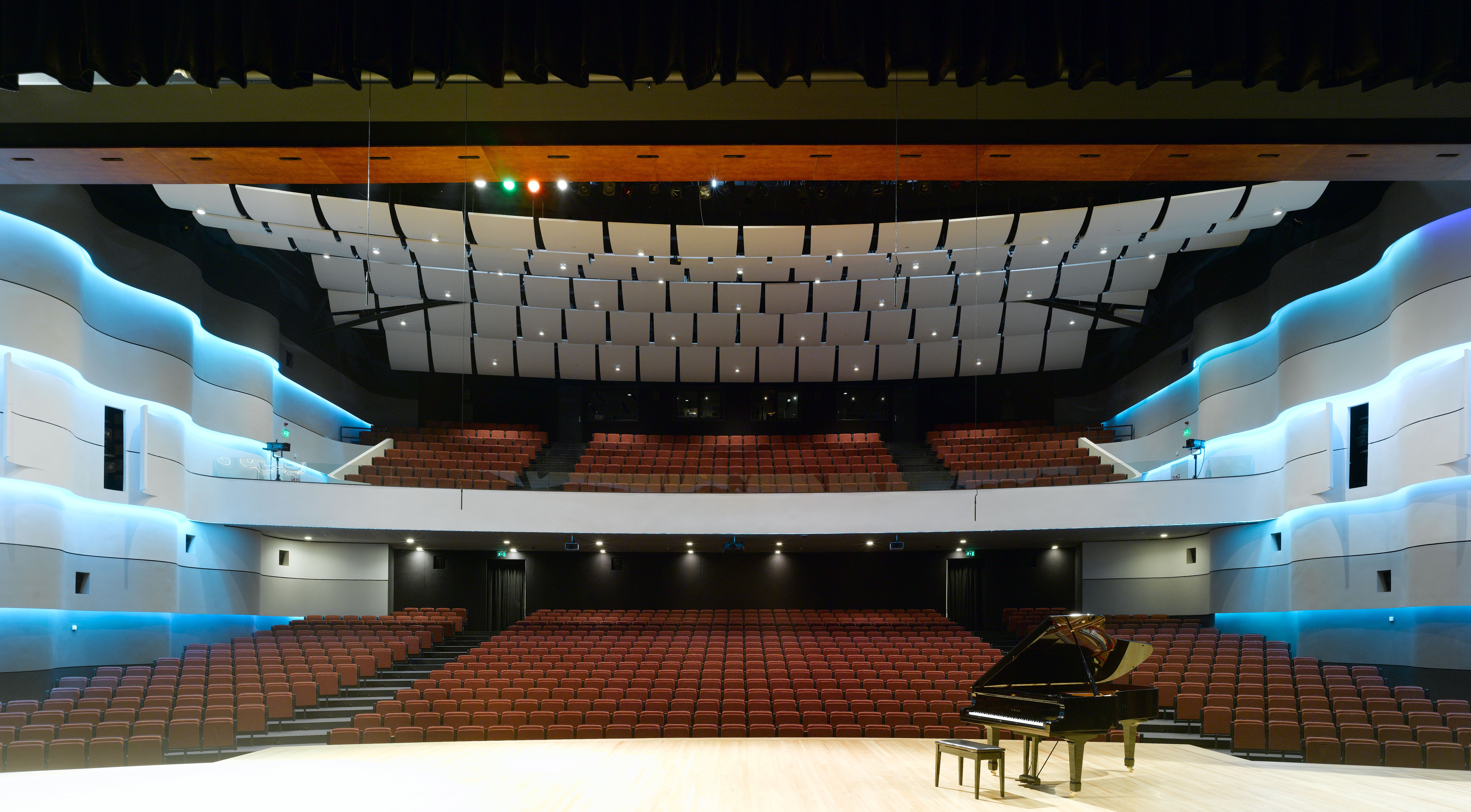
Atakan Demirseren Hall at Koç School

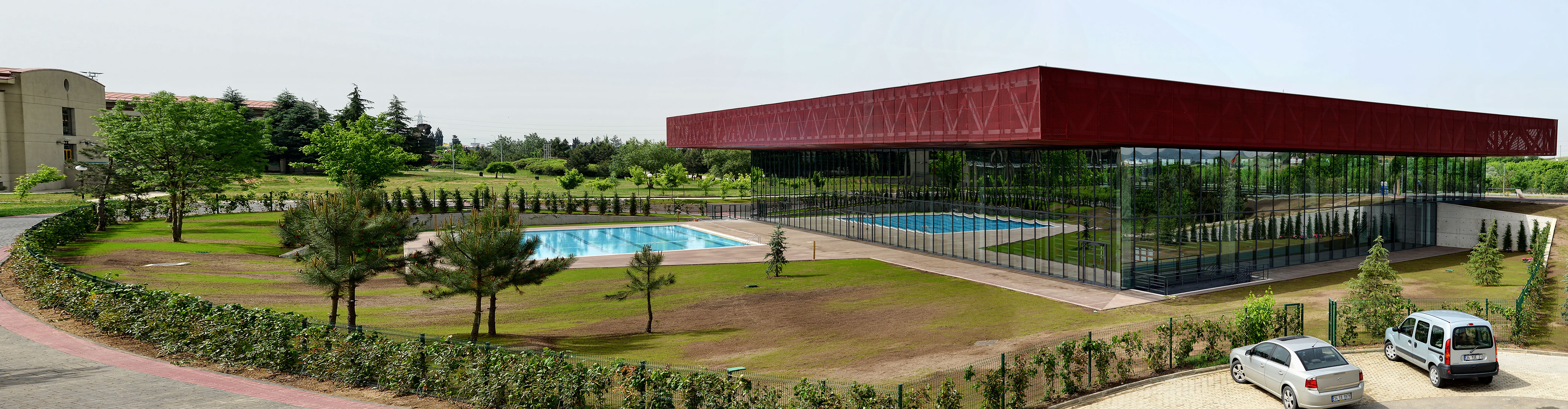
Koç School Pool Complex

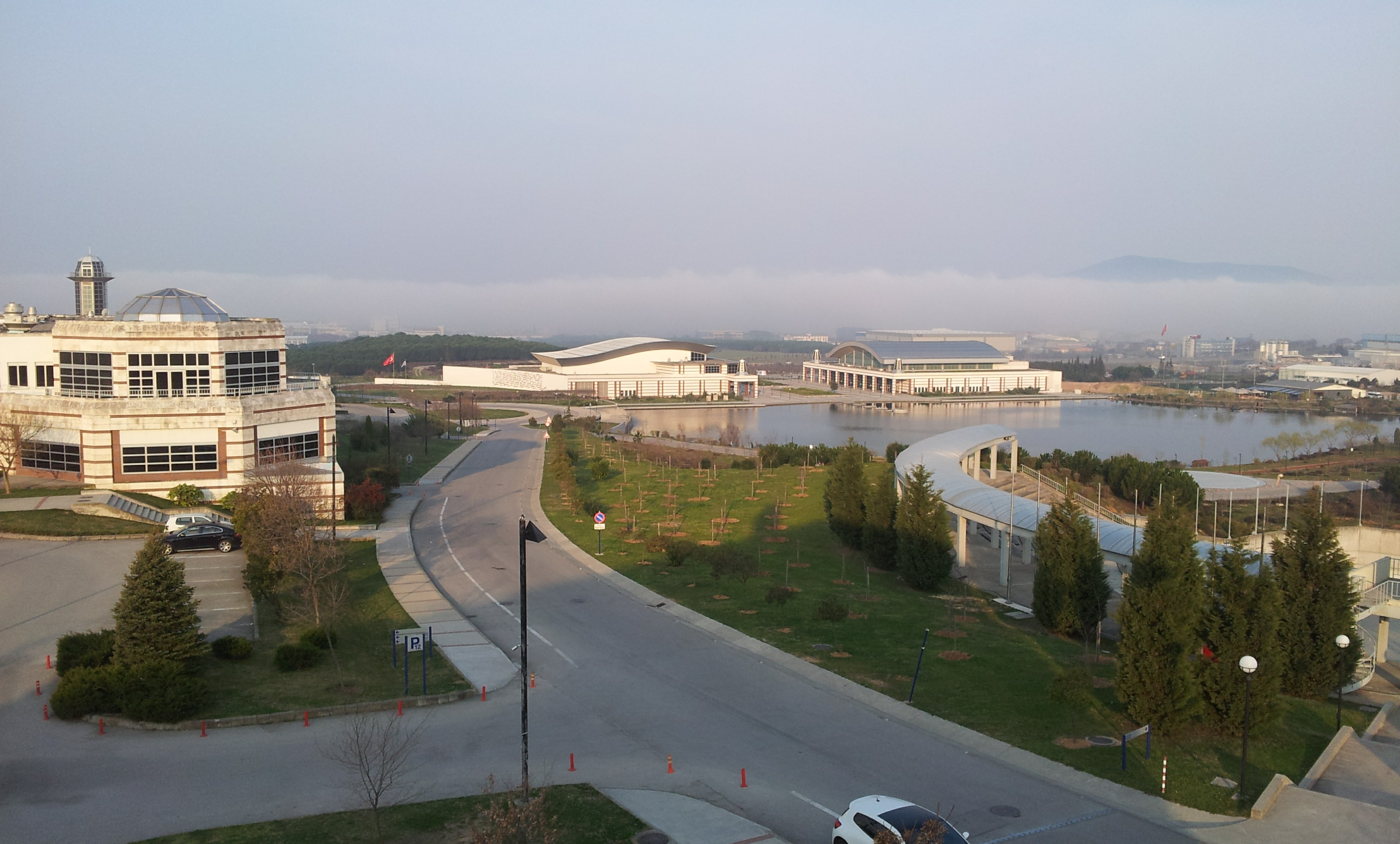
Sabancı University Campus

== Places of importance ==
- ITU School of Maritime
- Koç School
- Okan University
- Piri Reis University
- Sabancı University
- School of Infantry (Piyade Okulu)
- Turkish Naval Academy
- Istanbul Park Racing Circuit
- Tuzla Anatolian High School
- Viaport Marina Tuzla Shopping Center
- Ahmet Kilic Coastal Boulevard
- The Martyrs Avenue
- Tuzla Port Shopping Center

== Politics ==
The mayor of Tuzla during the 1990s was İdris Güllüce, a leading figure in the conservative Justice and Development Party (AK Party). In the 2024 local elections, Eren Ali Bingöl was elected mayor of Tuzla from the Republican People's Party. However, during the summer of 2026, Bingöl switched parties, joining the AK Party.
