= 15 Temmuz station =

Station of the Istanbul Metro

15 Temmuz
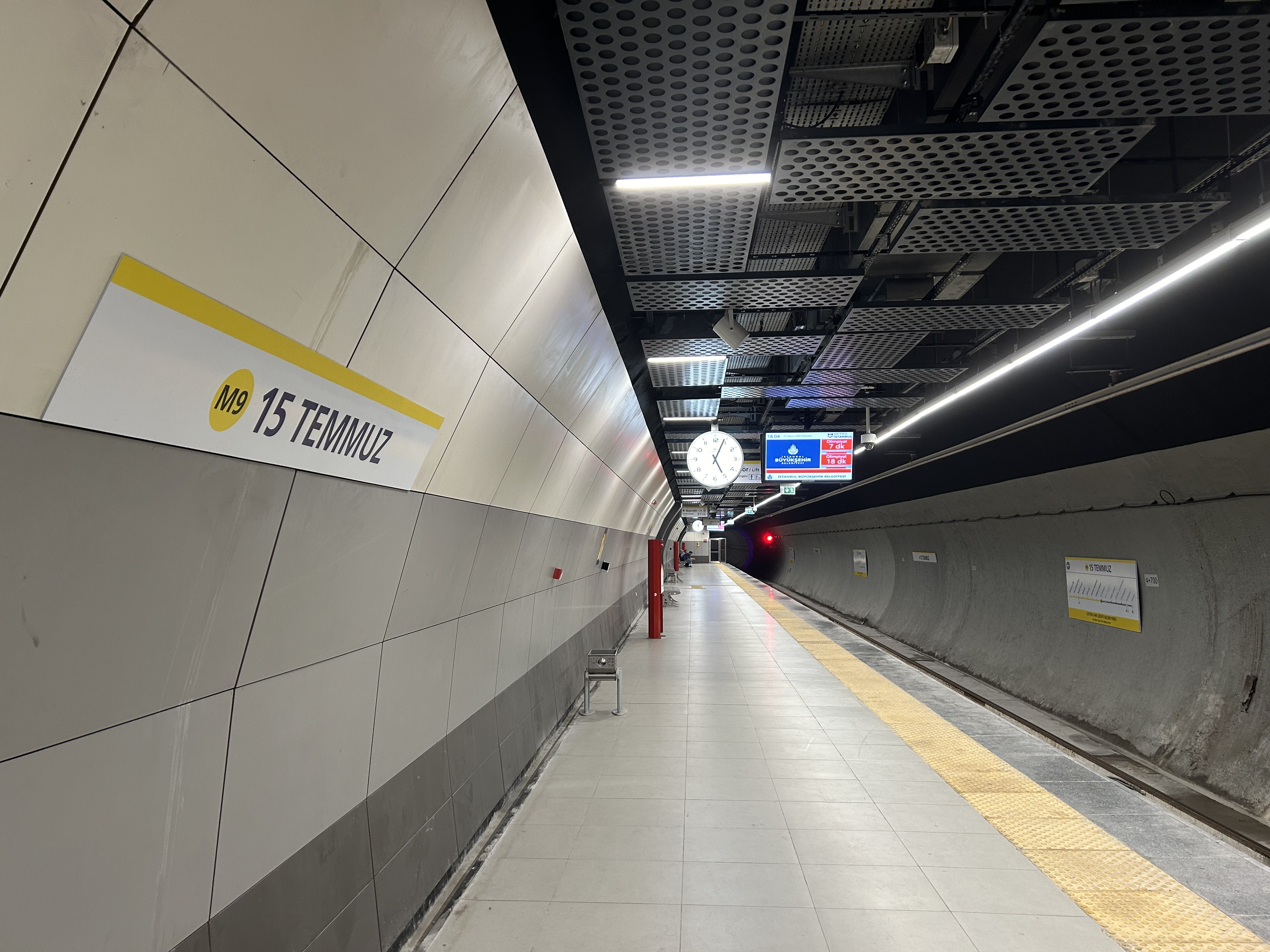
- Platform

General information
- Location: 15 July Neighborhood, Gülbahar Street, 34212; Bağcılar, Istanbul; Turkey
- Coordinates: 41°2′13″N 28°48′51″E
- System: Istanbul Metro rapid transit station
- Owner: Istanbul Metropolitan Municipality
- Operator: Istanbul Metro
- Line: M9
- Platforms: 1 Island platform
- Tracks: 2
- Connections: İETT Bus: 97, 97GE, 97M, 983, HT12, MK3, MK42; Istanbul Minibus: Şirinevler – Tahtakale, Şirinevler – Başakşehir, Şirinevler – Kayaşehir, Şirinevler – Kayaşehir Fenertepe, Olympiakent – Kuleli, Kuleli – Fenertepe, Kuleli – Deliklikaya, Kuleli – Kayabaşı

Construction
- Structure type: Underground
- Parking: No
- Cycle facilities: Yes
- Accessible: Yes

History
- Opened: 18 March 2024 (2 years ago)
- Electrified: 1,500 V DC Overhead line

Services
Preceding station	Istanbul Metro	Following station
Halkalı Caddesi towards Olimpiyat	M9 Line	Mimar Sinan towards Ataköy
Location

15 Temmuz (15 July) is an underground station on the M9 line of the Istanbul Metro. It is located under Gülbahar Street in the 15 July neighborhood of Bağcılar. It was opened on 18 March 2024, with the extension of M9 from Bahariye to Ataköy.

== Station layout ==
Platform level	Northbound	← toward Olimpiyat (Halkalı Caddesi)
Platform level	Island platform, doors will open on the left
Platform level	Southbound	toward Ataköy (Mimar Sinan) →

== Operation information ==
The line operates between 06:00 and 00:00 and train frequency is 9 minutes. The line has no night service.

== Gallery ==
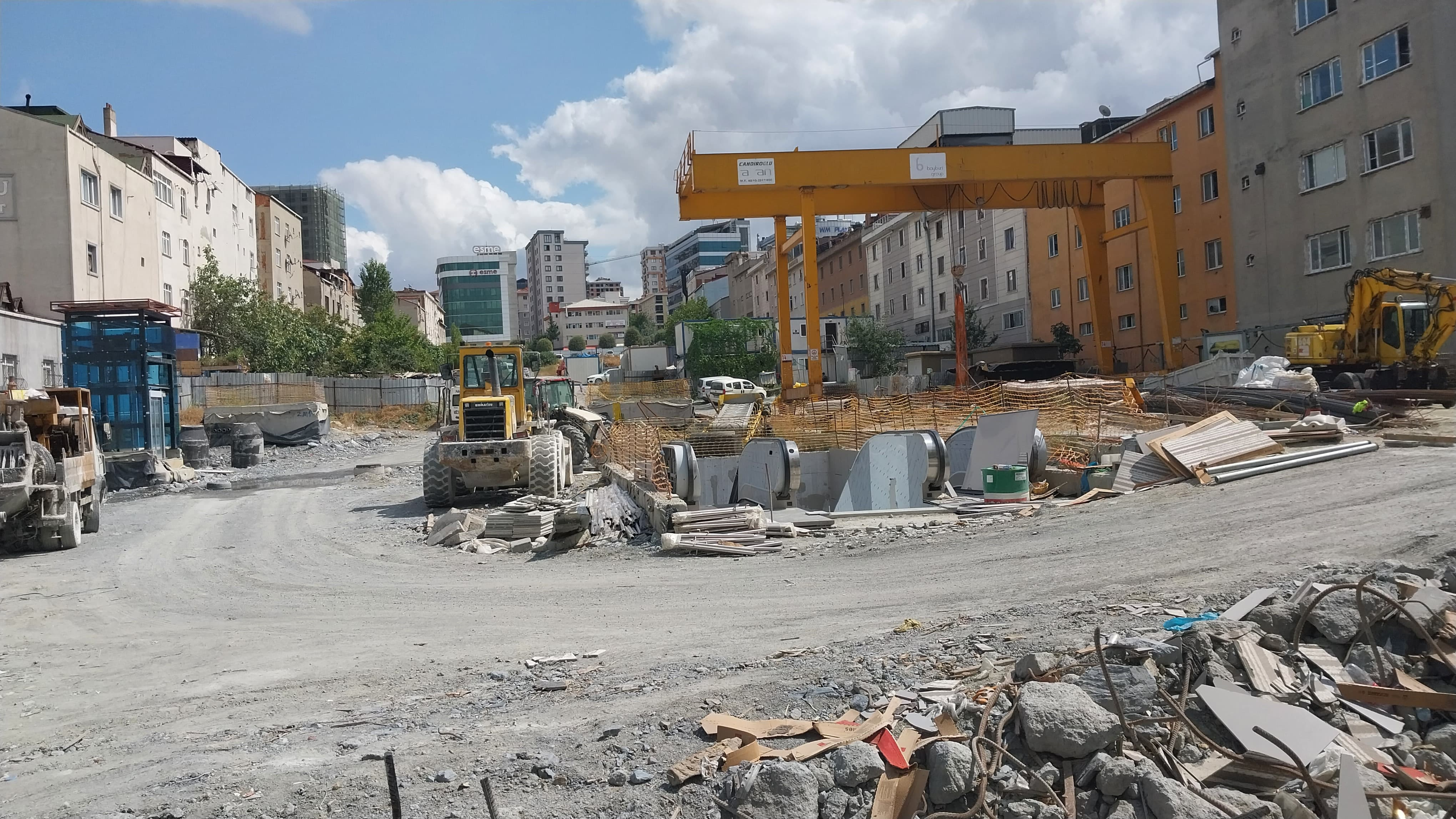
Construction site in September 2023

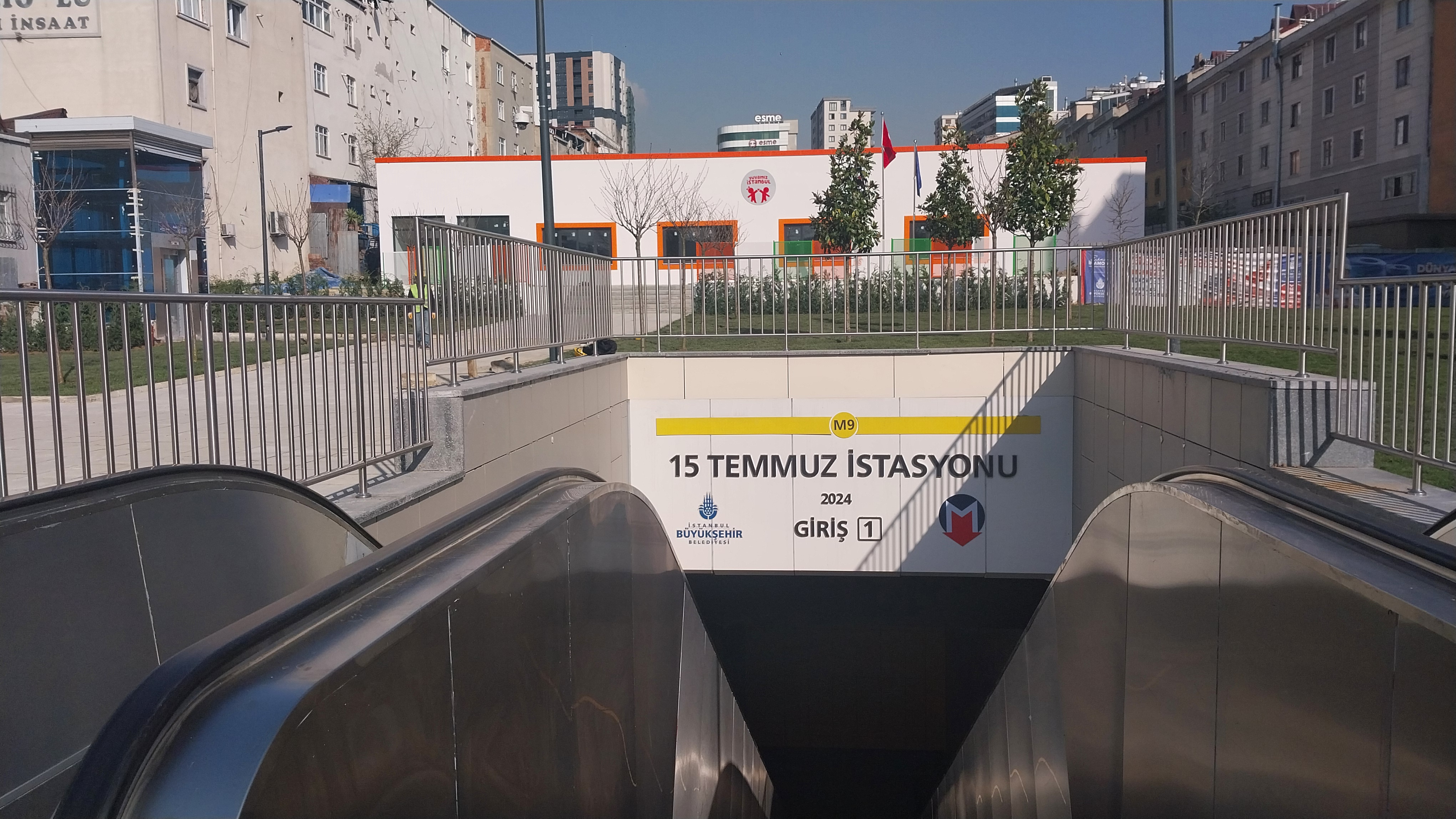
Entrance 1

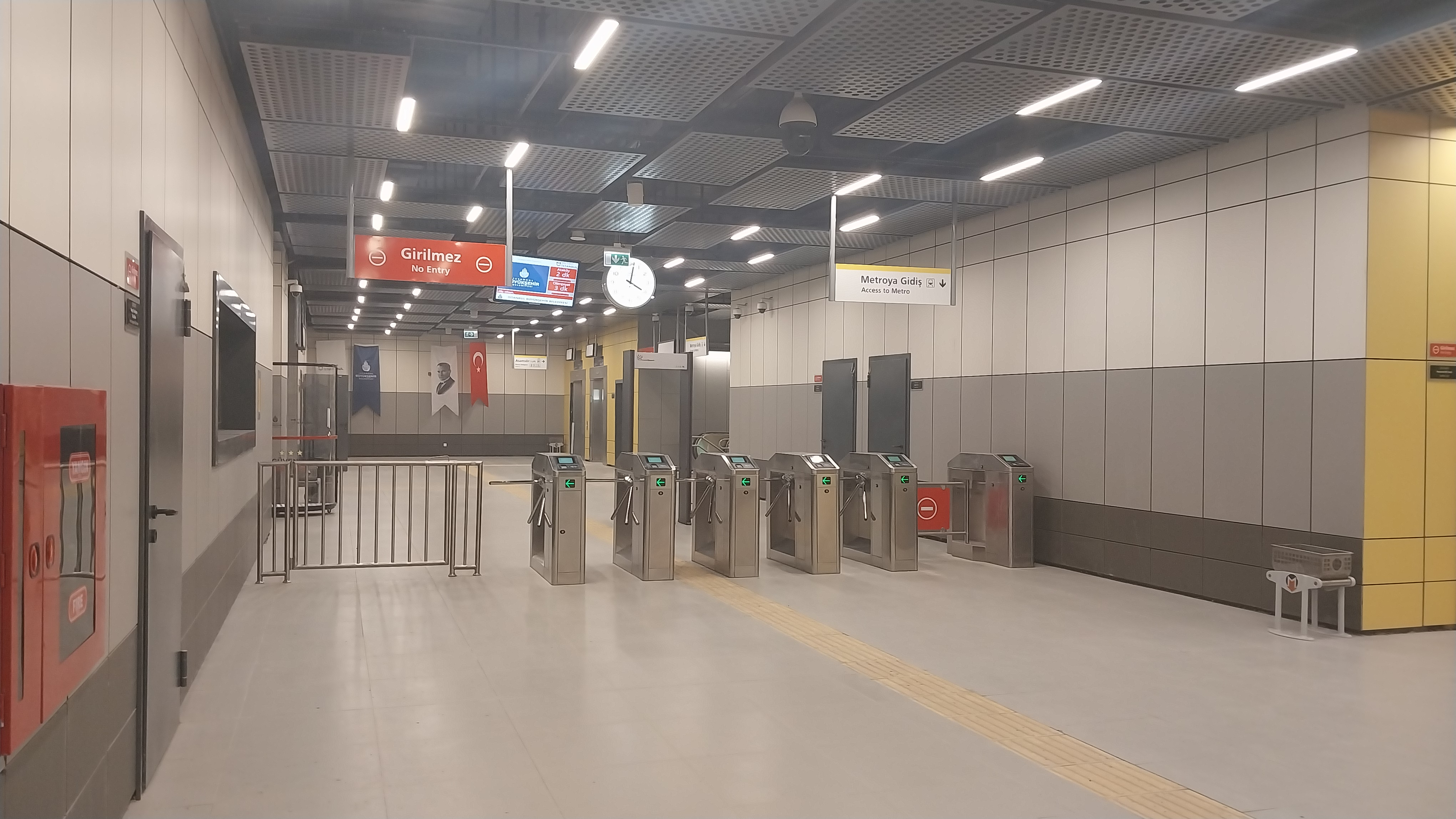
Ticket hall

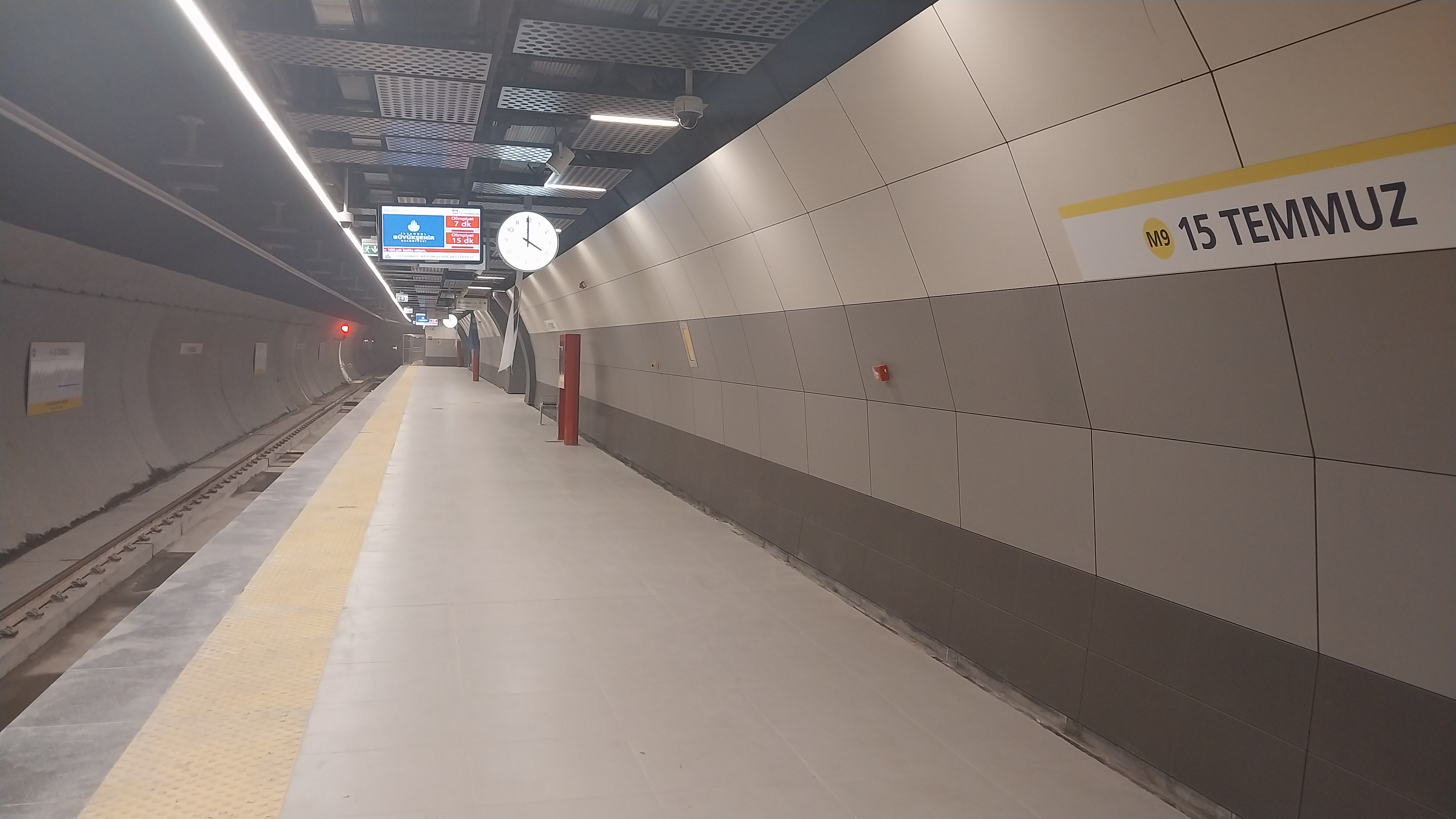
Platform
