= Halkalı Caddesi station =

Station of the Istanbul Metro

Halkalı Caddesi
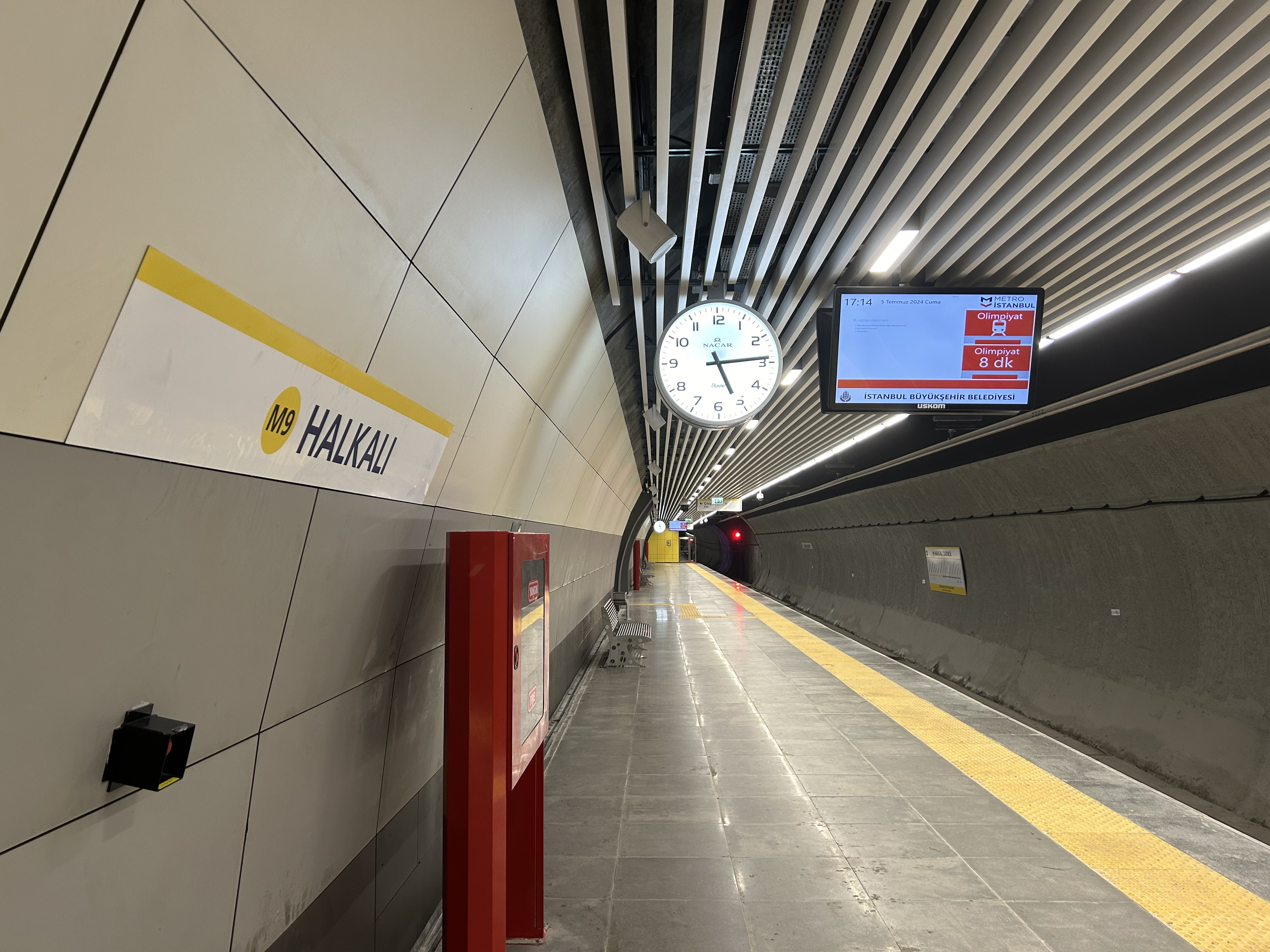
- Platform

General information
- Location: Atatürk Neighborhood, Halkalı Street, 34100; Küçükçekmece, Istanbul; Turkey
- Coordinates: 41°2′43″N 28°48′22″E
- System: Istanbul Metro rapid transit station
- Owner: Istanbul Metropolitan Municipality
- Operator: Istanbul Metro
- Line: M9
- Platforms: 1 Island platform
- Tracks: 2
- Connections: İETT Bus; Istanbul Minibus

Construction
- Structure type: Underground
- Parking: No
- Cycle facilities: Yes
- Accessible: Yes

History
- Opened: 18 March 2024 (2 years ago)
- Electrified: 1,500 V DC Overhead line

Services
Preceding station	Istanbul Metro	Following station
Atatürk Mahallesi towards Olimpiyat	M9 Line	15 Temmuz towards Ataköy
Location

Halkalı Caddesi is an underground station on the M9 line of the Istanbul Metro. It is located under Halkalı Street in the Atatürk neighborhood of Küçükçekmece. It was opened on 18 March 2024, with the extension of M9 from Bahariye to Ataköy.

== Station layout ==
Platform level	Northbound	← toward Olimpiyat (Atatürk Mahallesi)
Platform level	Island platform, doors will open on the left
Platform level	Southbound	toward Ataköy (15 Temmuz) →

== Operation information ==
The line operates between 06:00 and 00:00 and train frequency is 9 minutes. The line has no night service.

== Gallery ==
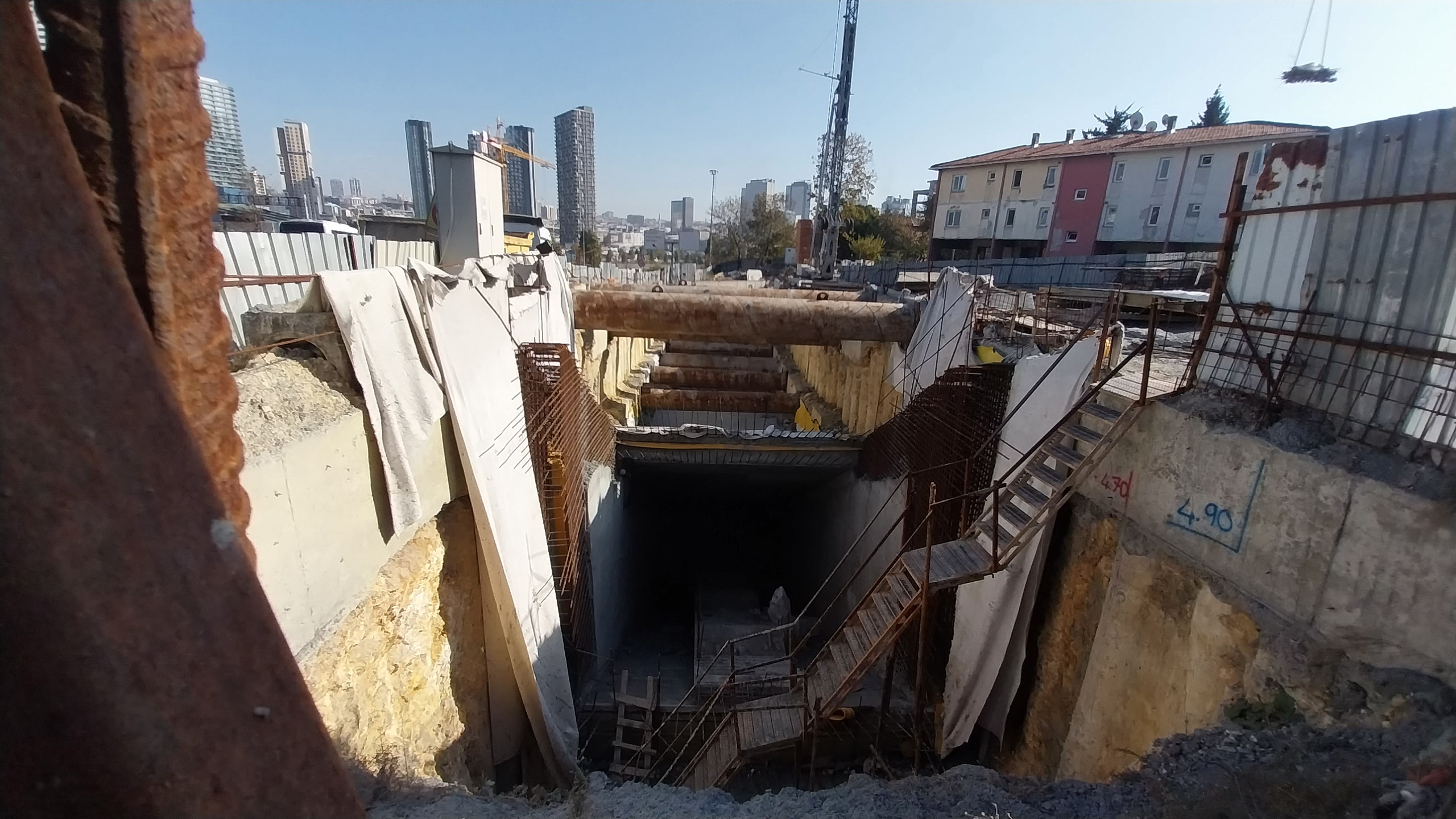
Construction site in 2022

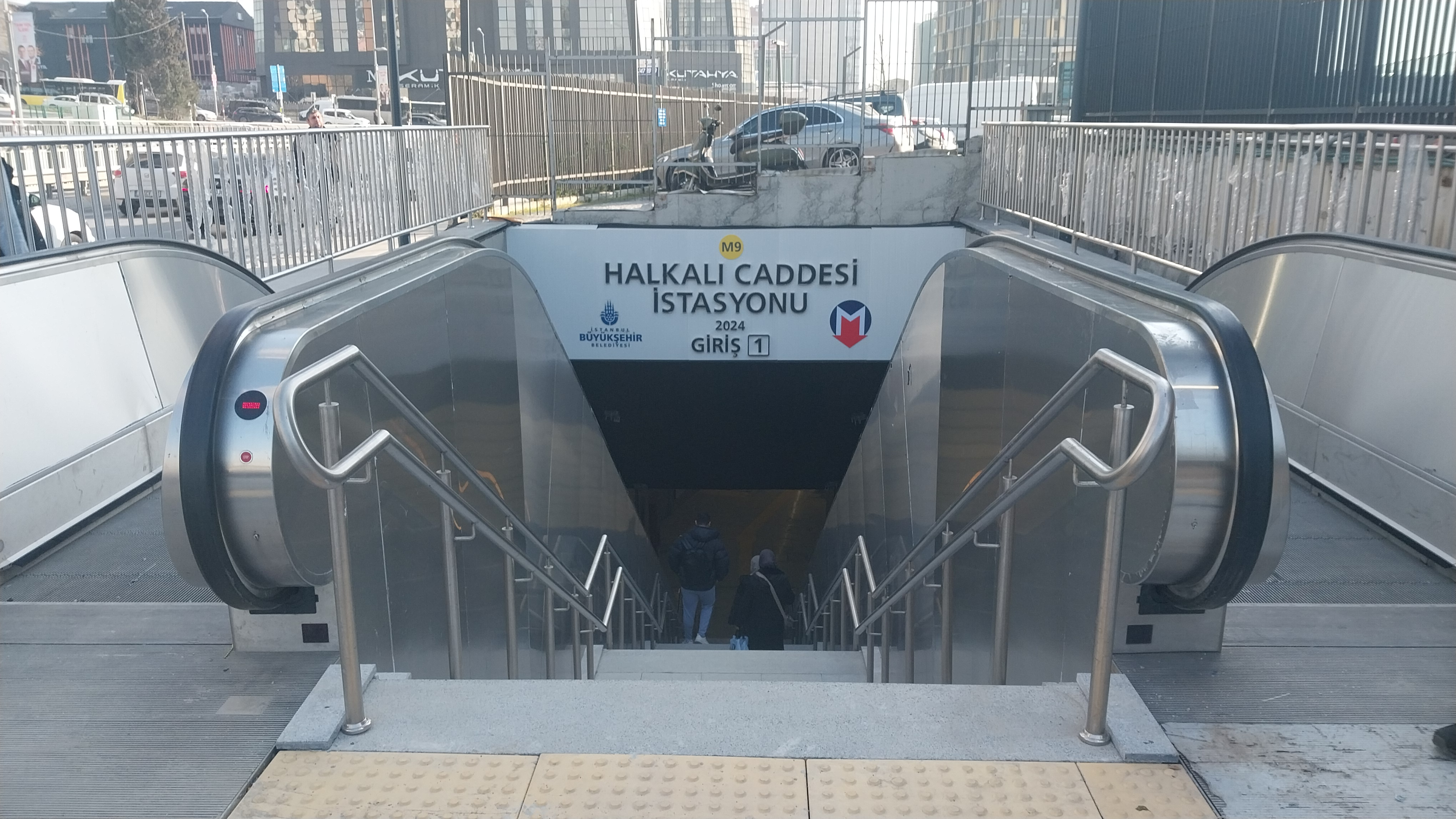
Entrance 1

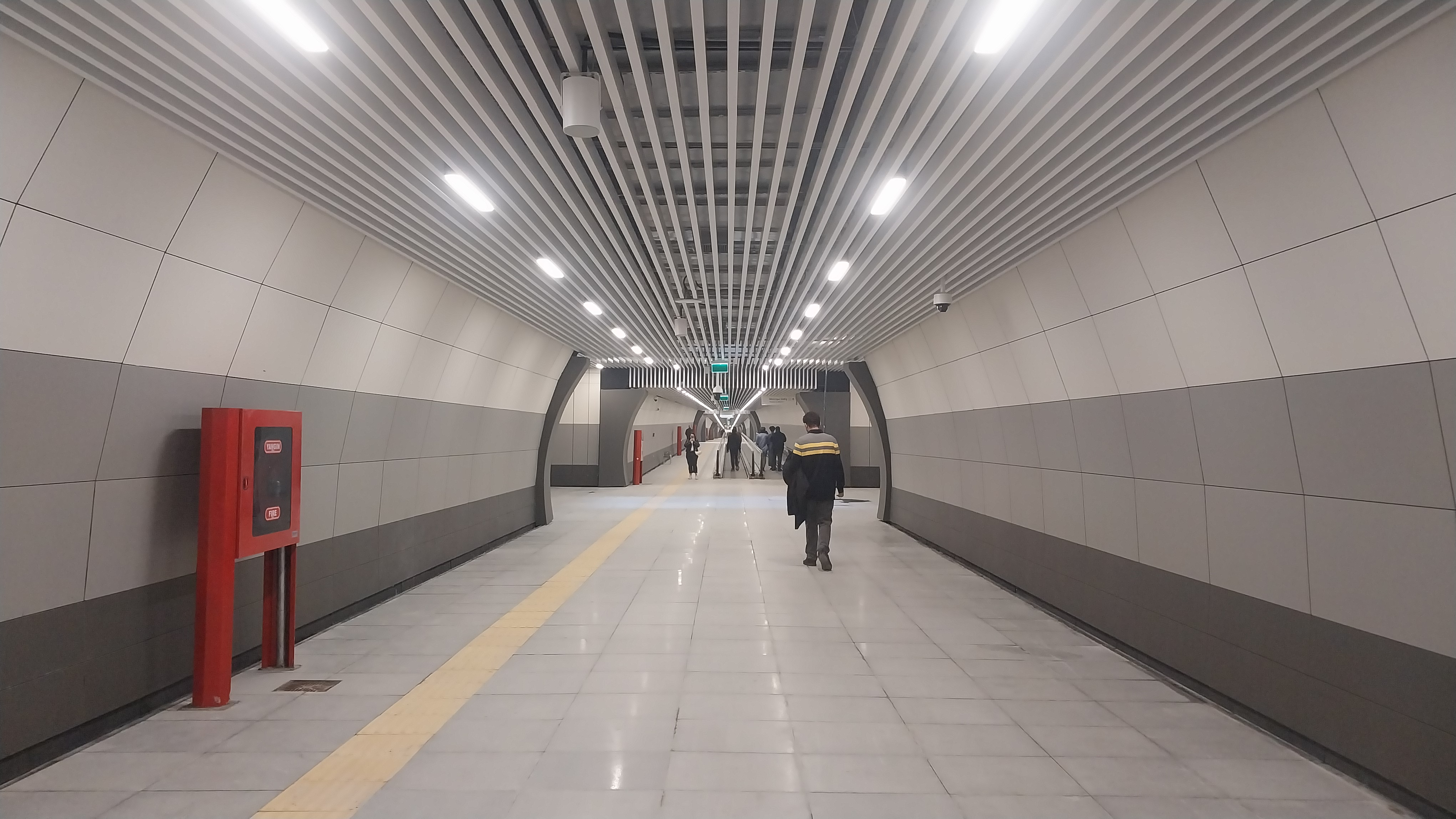
Underpass

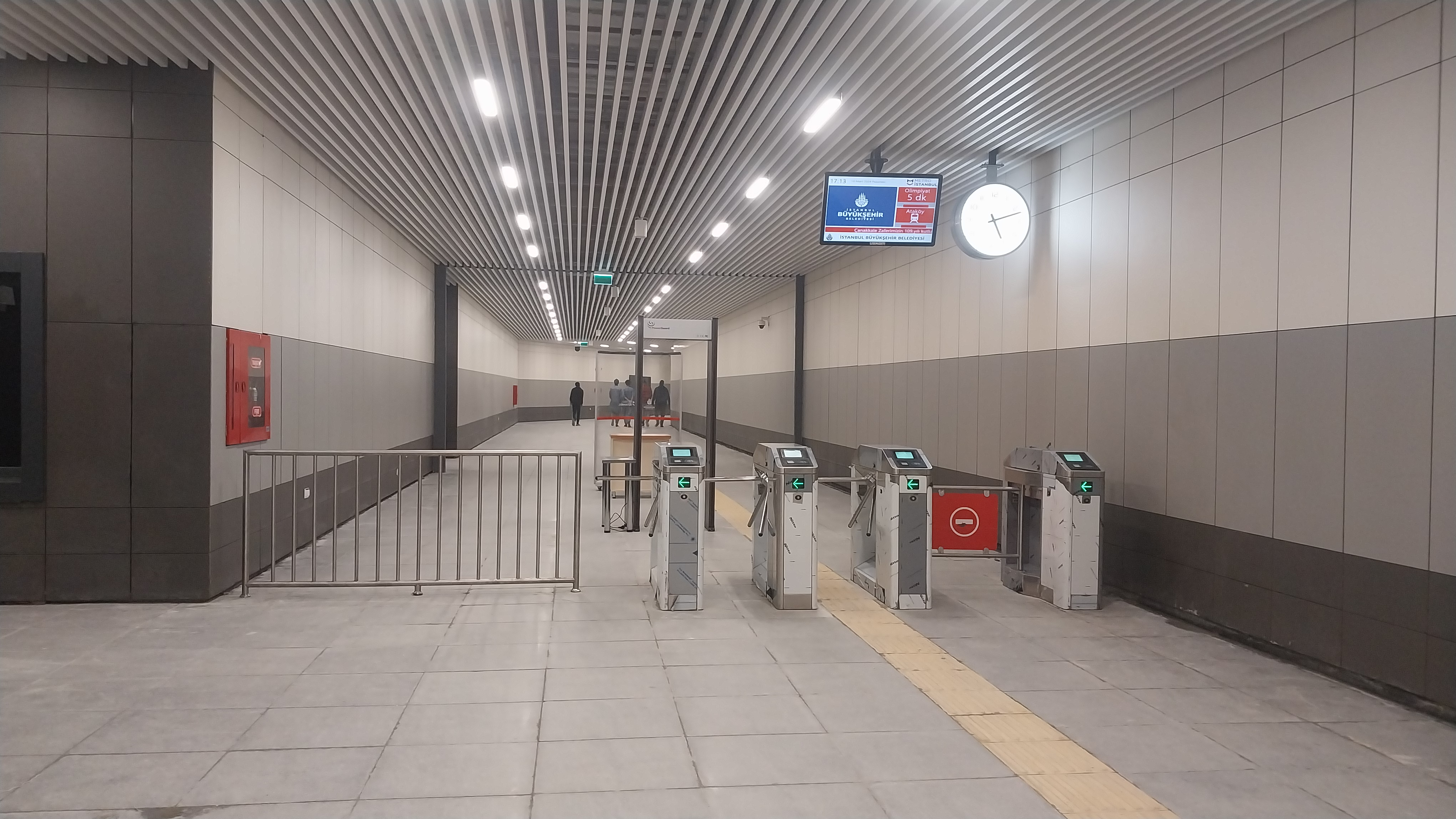
Ticket hall

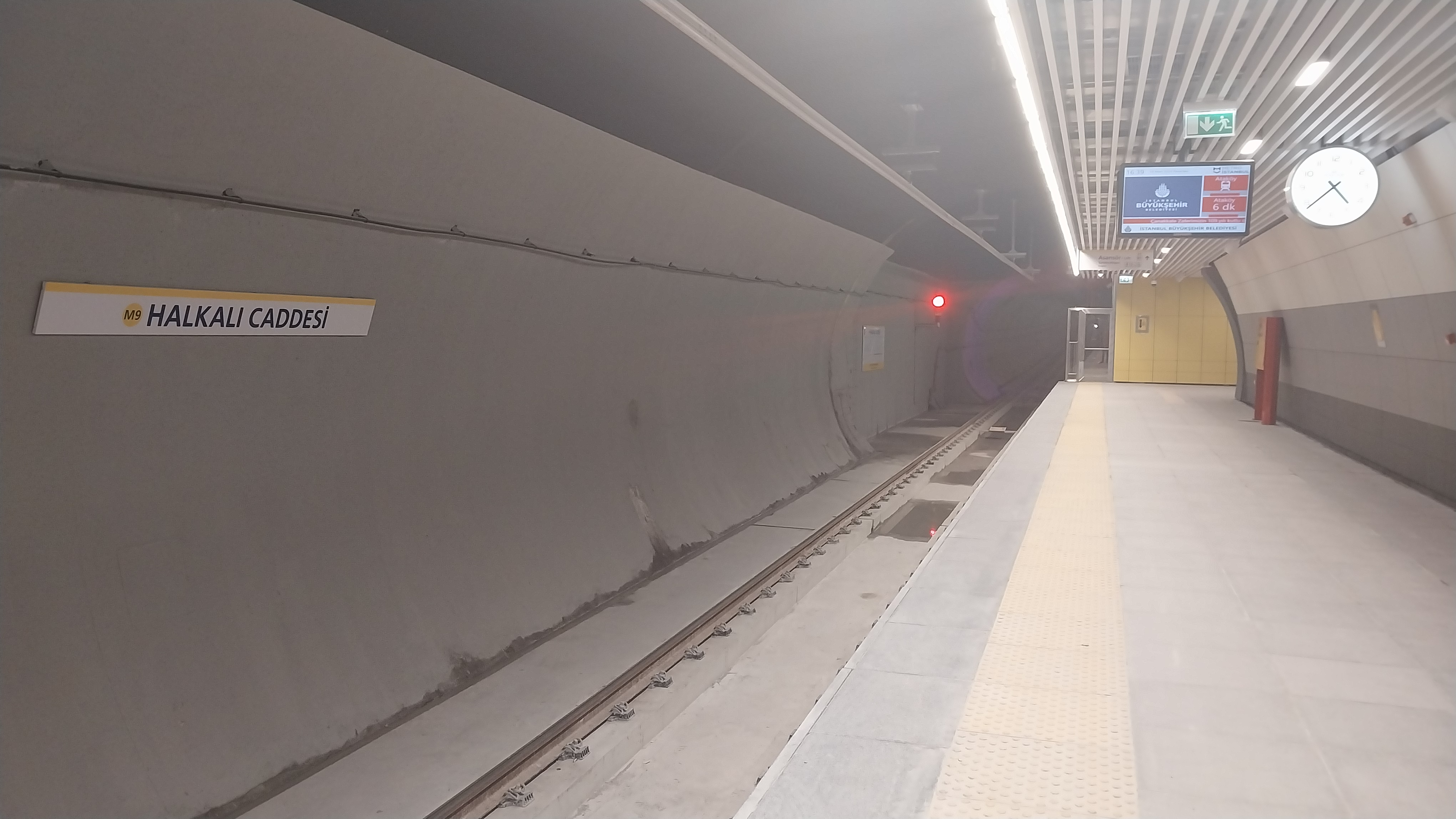
Platform
