= Mimar Sinan station =

Station of the Istanbul Metro

Mimar Sinan
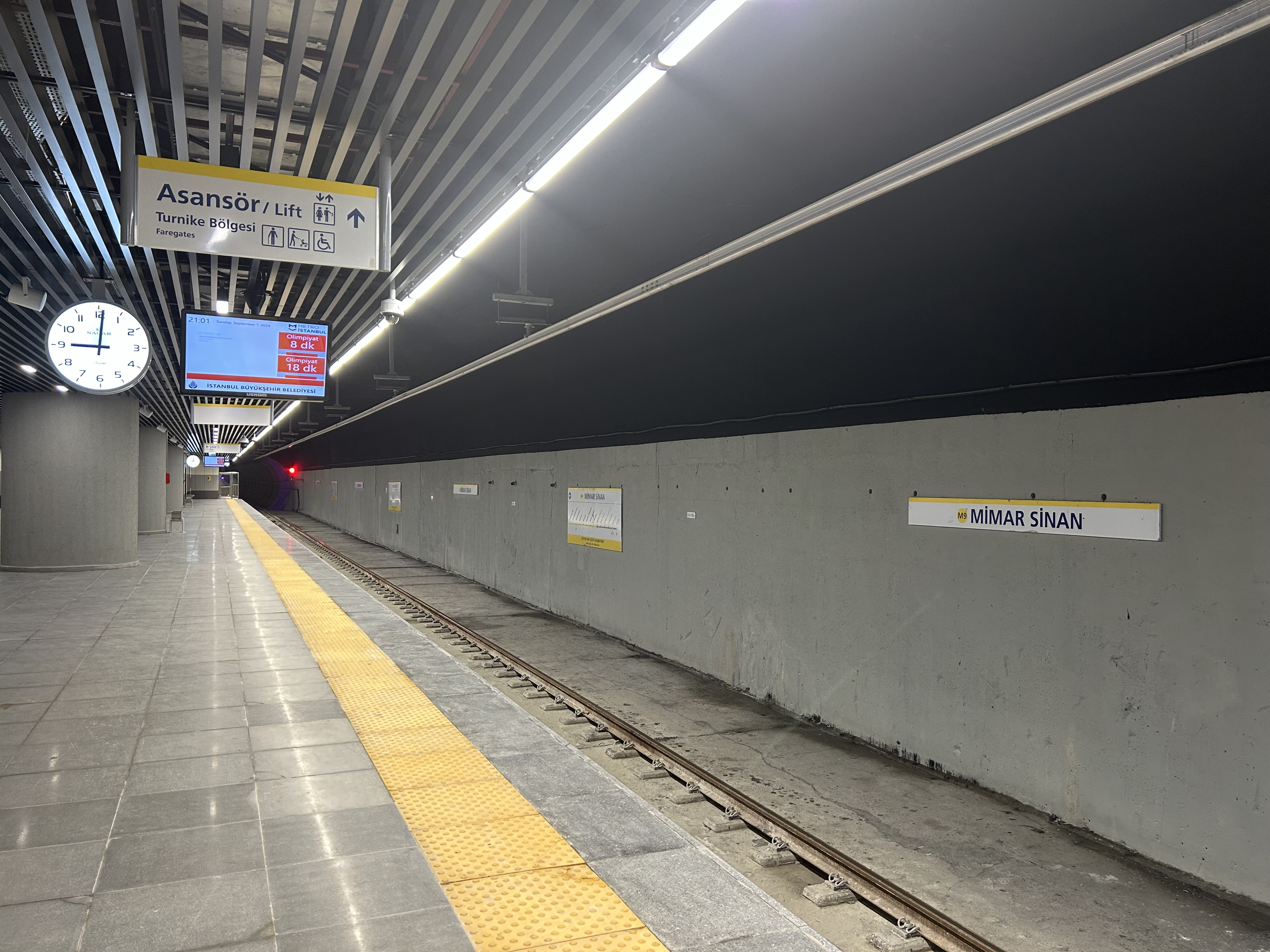
- Platform

General information
- Location: Bağlar Neighborhood, Mimar Sinan Street, 34212; Bağcılar, Istanbul; Turkey
- Coordinates: 41°1′30″N 28°49′0″E
- System: Istanbul Metro rapid transit station
- Owner: Istanbul Metropolitan Municipality
- Operator: Istanbul Metro
- Line: M9
- Platforms: 1 Island platform
- Tracks: 2
- Connections: İETT Bus; Istanbul Minibus

Construction
- Structure type: Underground
- Parking: No
- Cycle facilities: Yes
- Accessible: Yes

History
- Opened: 30 August 2024 (23 months ago)
- Electrified: 1,500 V DC Overhead line

Services
Preceding station	Istanbul Metro	Following station
15 Temmuz towards Olimpiyat	M9 Line	Doğu Sanayi towards Ataköy
Location

Mimar Sinan is an underground station on the M9 line of the Istanbul Metro. It is located under Mimar Sinan Street in the Bağlar neighborhood of Bağcılar. Due to slow construction progress, it could not be opened with the rest of the extension of M9 from Bahariye to Ataköy on 18 March 2024. The station was opened on 30 August 2024.

It will become an interchange with the M1B line in 2029.

== Station layout ==
Platform level	Northbound	← toward Olimpiyat (15 Temmuz)
Platform level	Island platform, doors will open on the left
Platform level	Southbound	toward Ataköy (Doğu Sanayi) →

== Operation information ==
The line operates between 06:00 and 00:00 and train frequency is 9 minutes. The line has no night service.
