= Atatürk Mahallesi station =

Station of the Istanbul Metro

Atatürk Mahallesi
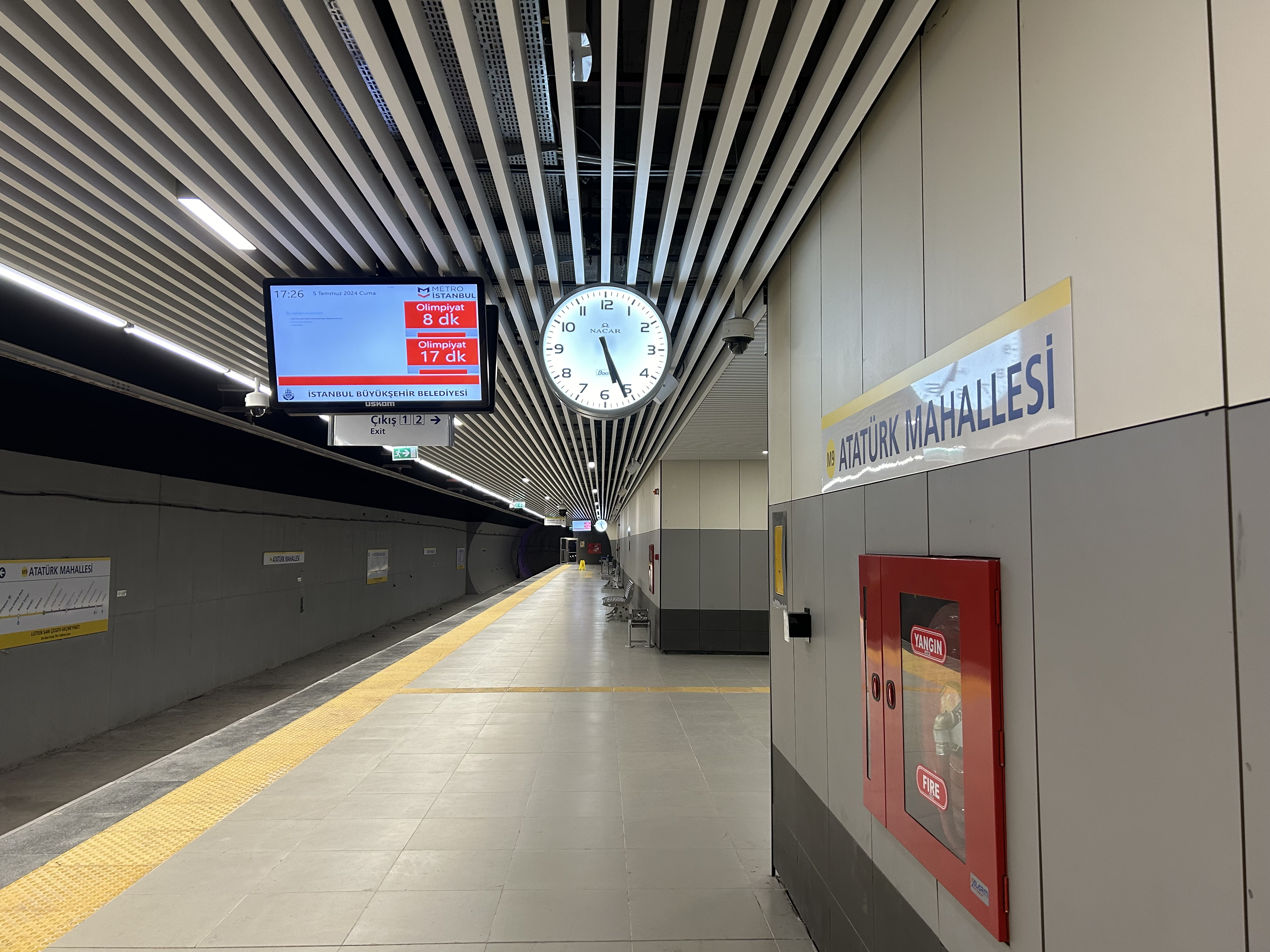
- M9 platform

General information
- Location: Atatürk Neighborhood, Öztürk Street, 34307; Küçükçekmece, Istanbul; Turkey
- Coordinates: 41°3′7″N 28°47′51″E
- System: Istanbul Metro rapid transit station
- Owner: Istanbul Metropolitan Municipality
- Operator: Istanbul Metro
- Line: M9
- Platforms: 1 Island platform
- Tracks: 2
- Connections: İETT Bus: 36AY, 76O, 78ZB, 79FY, 79K, 89C, 89F, 89M, 98, 98H, 89KM, 98MB, 141K, 141M, H-3 HS1, MK19, MK31; Istanbul Minibus: Bakırköy – İkitelli Köyiçi, Küçükçekmece – Deprem Konutları, Küçükçekmece – Kayaşehir, Şirinevler – Kayaşehir, Şirinevler – Kayaşehir Fenertepe, Topkapı – İkitelli Organize Sanayi, Otogar – İkitelli Organize Sanayi

Construction
- Structure type: Underground
- Parking: No
- Cycle facilities: Yes
- Accessible: Yes

History
- Opened: 18 March 2024 (2 years ago)
- Electrified: 1,500 V DC Overhead line

Services
Preceding station	Istanbul Metro	Following station
Bahariye towards Olimpiyat	M9 Line	Halkalı Caddesi towards Ataköy
Location

Atatürk Mahallesi is an underground station on the M9 line of the Istanbul Metro. It is located under Öztürk Street in the Atatürk neighborhood of Küçükçekmece. It was opened on 18 March 2024, with the extension of M9 from Bahariye to Ataköy.

The station was originally designed to be a single station complex with the future M7 line station. When the M7 line extension was revised in 2021, it was decided that the connection between the stations would be abandoned and that the M7 station would be built with the shaft type. Another revision was made in 2023, which meant that this decision was abandoned and it was decided to build the M7 station in a tunnel type and connect it to the M9 station via a pedestrian underpass of approximately 130 meters.

== Station layout ==
Platform level	Northbound	← toward Olimpiyat (Bahariye)
Platform level	Island platform, doors will open on the left
Platform level	Southbound	toward Ataköy (Halkalı Caddesi) →

== Operation information ==
The line operates between 06:00 and 00:00 and train frequency is 9 minutes. The line has no night service.

== Gallery ==
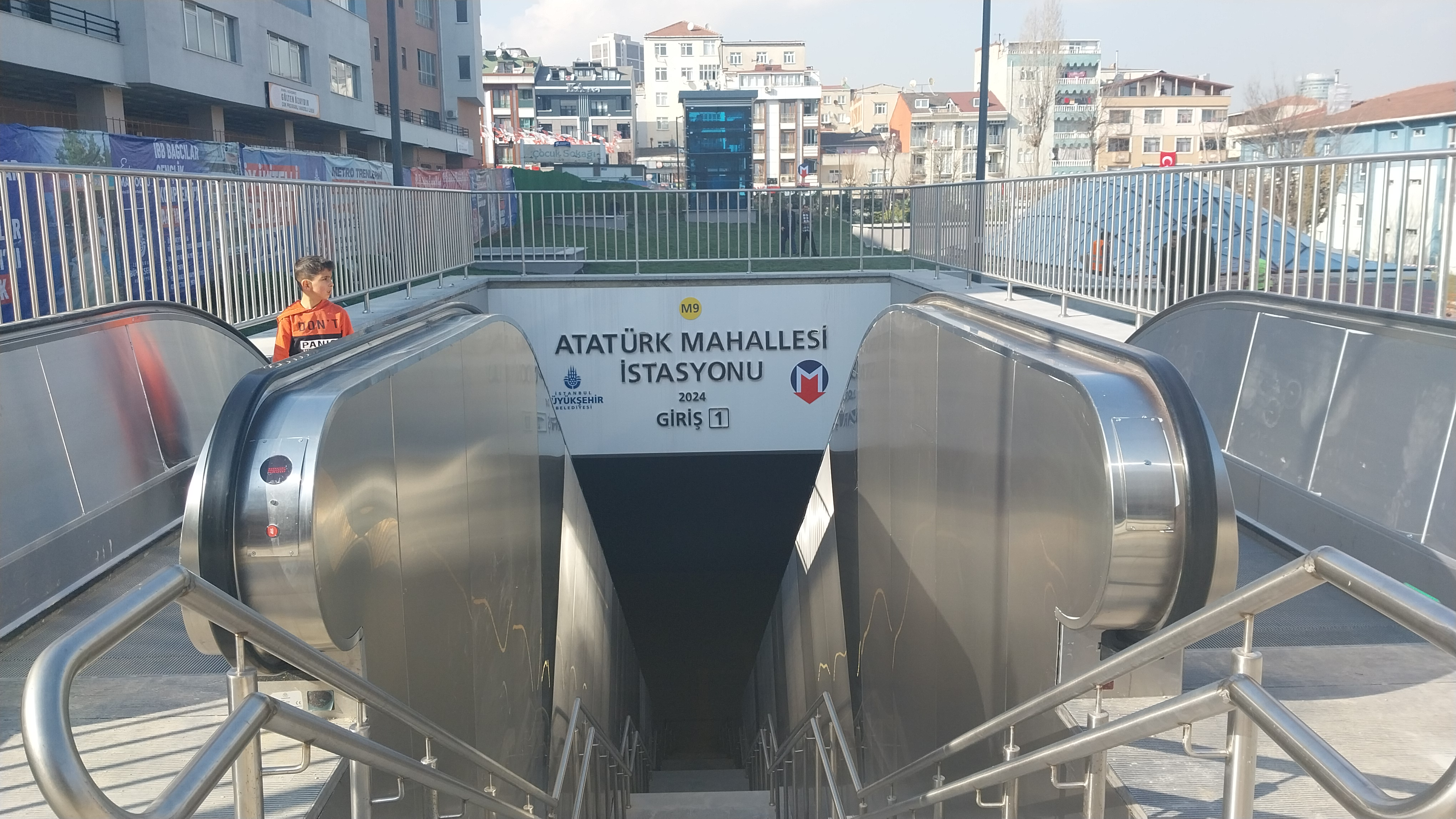
Entrance 1

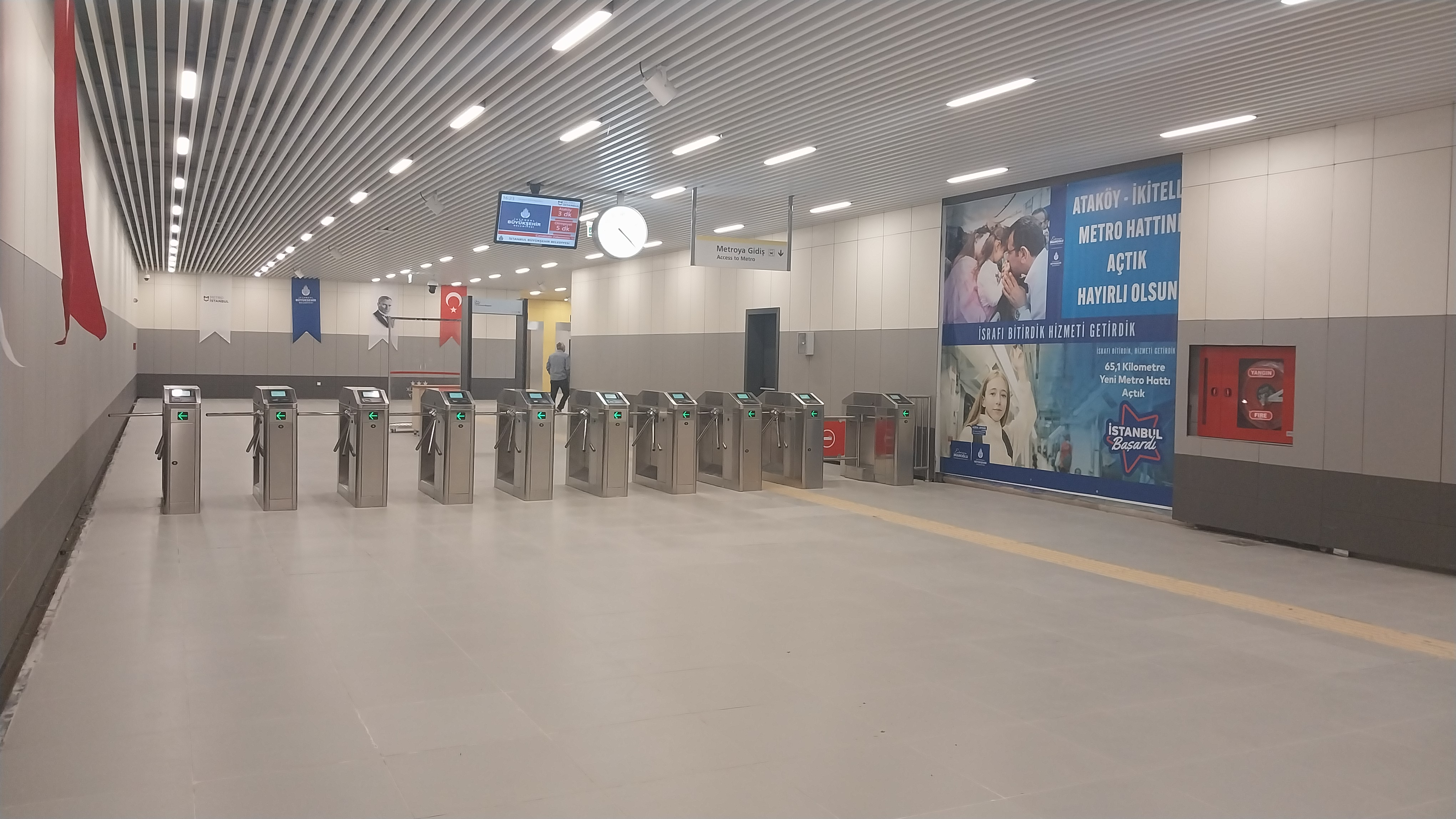
Ticket hall

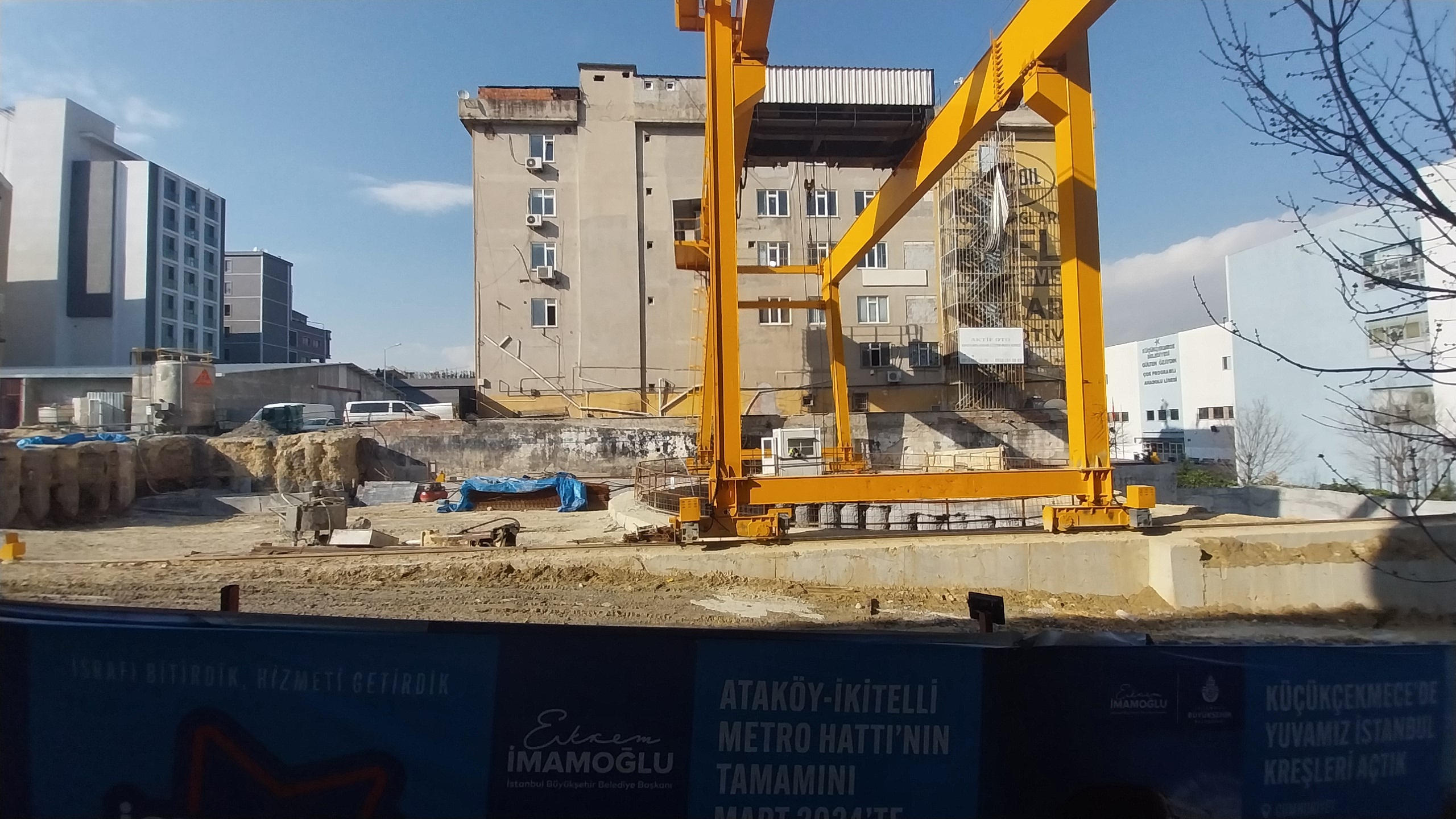
M7 construction site

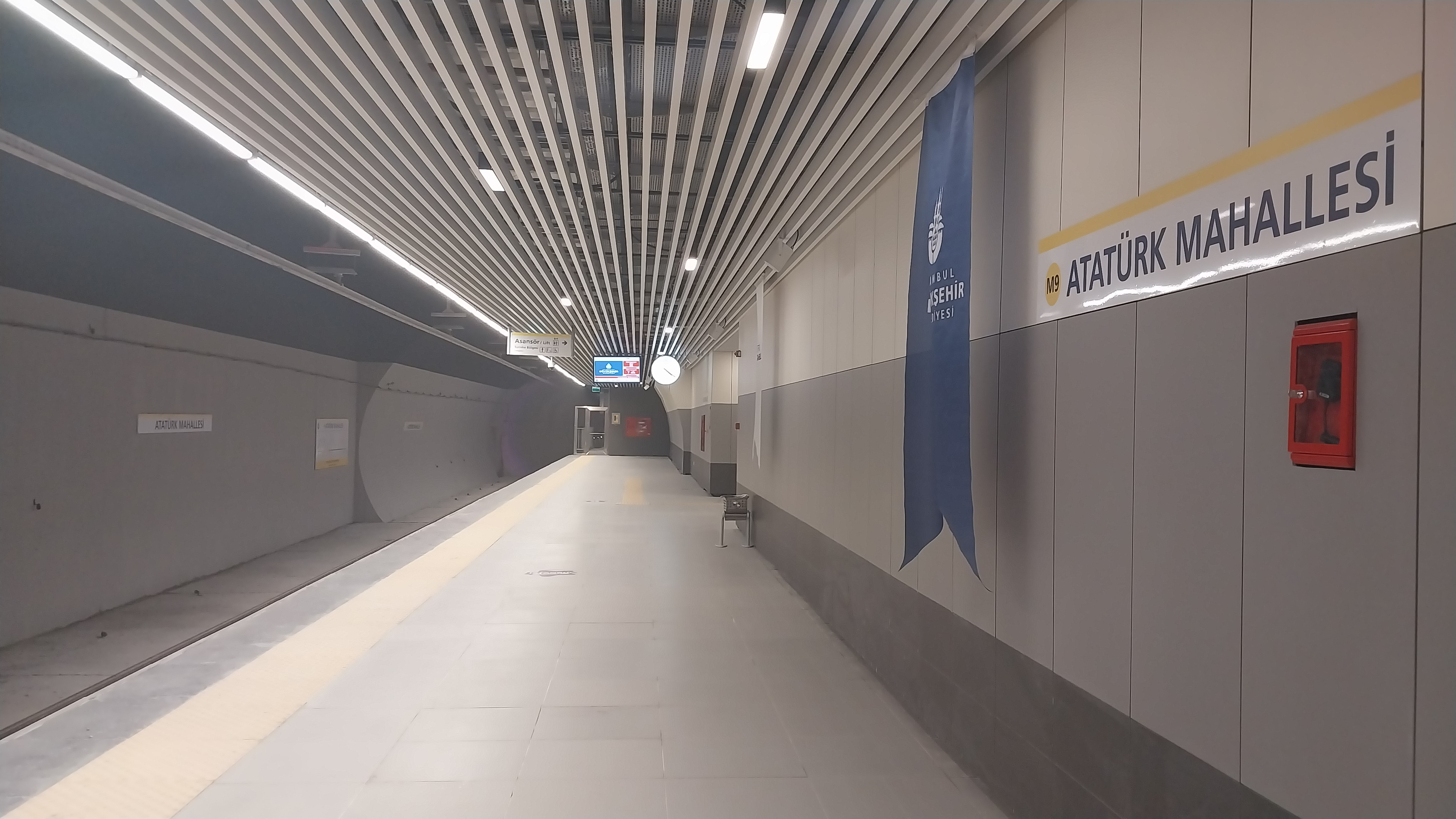
M9 platform in 2024
