= M9 =

M9, M-9 most often refers to:

- Beretta M9, a 9 mm pistol

M9, M-9 or M09 may refer to:

== Aviation ==
- Grigorovich M-9, a Russian World War I-era biplane flying boat
- Miles M.9 Master, a 1939 British 2-seat monoplane advanced trainer
- Motor Sich Airlines, a Ukrainian airline (IATA airline designator: M9)

== Computers ==
- M9-IX, a short name for the Moscow Internet Exchange
- Apple M9, one of the company's series of Apple motion coprocessors

== Firearms and military equipment ==
- Beretta M9, the formerly standard-issue service pistol for the US Army and other forces
- M9M1, a 9mm/.45ACP submachine gun
- M-9, the export name for the Chinese missile DF-15
- M9 half-track, a variant of the M2 Half Track
- M9 bayonet, a United States military knife
- M9 armored combat earthmover, a United States military earthmover
- M9 anti-tank rocket launcher, another name for the bazooka
- M9 flamethrower, flamethrower, United States
- M9 gun director, director used with 90mm anti-aircraft guns
- T40/M9 tank destroyer, American tank destroyer

== Science ==
- Messier 9 (M9), a globular cluster in the constellation Ophiuchus
- ATC code M09 Other drugs for disorders of the musculo-skeletal system, a subgroup of the Anatomical Therapeutic Chemical Classification System
- M9 medium, a salt medium for cultivating Escherichia coli

== Transport ==
- M9 road (disambiguation), various roads
- M9 (New York City bus), a New York City Bus route in Manhattan
- M9, a Washington, D.C. Metrobus route
- Sri Lanka Railways M9, Sri Lanka Railways diesel-electric locomotive
- M9 (railcar), a Long Island Rail Road car
- M9 (Istanbul Metro), a rapid transit rail line in Istanbul, Turkey
- AITO M9, a Chinese electric SUV
- Bestune M9, a Chinese minivan
- Geely Galaxy M9, a Chinese plug-in hybrid SUV

== Other ==
- Leica M9, a camera
- Meizu M9, a smartphone with Android
- HTC One M9, a smartphone with Android
- "M9", a song by British band Boards of Canada, released on their Boc Maxima demo in 1996
- "M9", a fictional British secret intelligence agency in the television spy show Danger Man
- M9, a difficulty grade in mixed climbing

== See also ==
- 9M (disambiguation)
