= 9P =

9P or 9-P may refer to:

== Science and technology ==
- 9P (protocol), a network protocol developed for the Plan 9 from Bell Labs distributed operating system
- 9P, NASA code for Progress M1-9
- 9p, an arm of Chromosome 9 (human)
- 9P/Tempel; see Tempel 1
- Monosomy 9p, a chromosomal disorder due to deletion
- Tetrasomy 9p, a genetic disease due to inclusion

== Engineering ==
- 9P, a variant of Salmson 9
- 9P, a model of AIM-9 Sidewinder
- GCR Class 9P, a class of British 4-6-0 steam locomotive
- Yak-9P, a model of Yakovlev Yak-9

== Other uses ==
- New York State Route 9P

== See also ==
- P9 (disambiguation)
