= 9Y =

9Y or 9-Y may refer to:

- 9 years
- 9Y, IATA airline code for Air Kazakhstan, which went bankrupt in 2004
- 9Y, international code identifying airplanes from the state of Trinidad and Tobago
- Salmson 9Y, a model of Salmson 9
- USP9Y, or Ubiquitin specific peptidase 9, Y-linked
- 9Y, Aircraft registration for Trinidad and Tobago

== See also ==
- Y9 (disambiguation)
