= Ziya Gökalp Mahallesi station =

Station of the Istanbul Metro

Ziya Gökalp Mahallesi
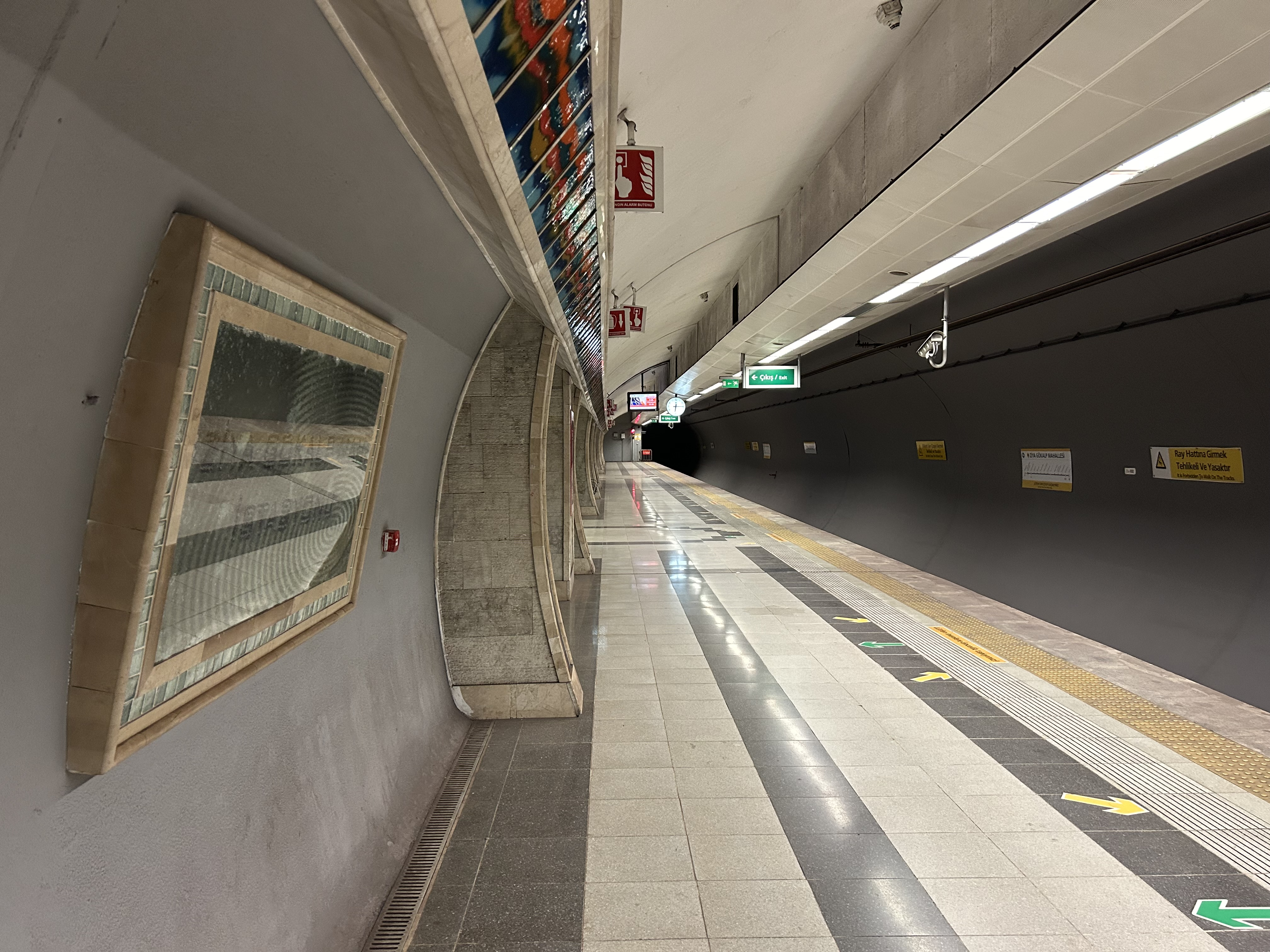
- Platform

General information
- Location: Ziya Gökalp Neighborhood, Hürriyet Boulevard, 34490; Başakşehir, Istanbul; Turkey
- Coordinates: 41°4′28″N 28°47′11″E
- System: Istanbul Metro rapid transit station
- Owner: Istanbul Metropolitan Municipality
- Operator: Metro Istanbul A.Ş.
- Line: M9
- Platforms: 1 Island platform
- Tracks: 2
- Connections: İETT Bus: 31Y, 78ZB, 78Ş, 79K, 79Ş, 89C, 98, 98KM, 143, MK19; Istanbul Minibus: Bakırköy-İkitelli, Deprem Konutları-Küçükçekmece, Küçükçekemece-Kayaşehir, Şirinevler-Başakşehir, Şirinevler-Kayaşehir Fenertepe Sefaköy-Kayaşehir, Sefaköy-Onurkent

Construction
- Structure type: Underground
- Parking: No
- Cycle facilities: Yes
- Accessible: Yes

History
- Opened: 13 June 2013 (13 years ago)(As part of M3)
- Electrified: 1,500 V DC Overhead line

Services
Preceding station	Istanbul Metro	Following station
Olimpiyat Terminus	M9 Line	İkitelli Sanayi towards Ataköy
Location

Ziya Gökalp Mahallesi is an underground station on the M9 line of the Istanbul Metro in Başakşehir, Istanbul. The station is located beneath Hürriyet Boulevard in the Ziya Gökalp neighborhood of Başakşehir. Ziya Gökalp Mahallesi was opened on 13 June 2013 as part of the Olimpiyatköy branch to Olimpiyat station. It was converted in to the M9 line along with Olimpiyat station.

== Station Layout ==
P Platform level	Westbound	← toward Olimpiyat (terminus)
P Platform level	Island platform, doors will open on the left
P Platform level	Eastbound	toward Ataköy (İkitelli Sanayi) →

== Operation information ==
The line operates between 06:00 and 00:00 and train frequency is 9 minutes. The line has no night service.
