= 9M =

9M or 9-M may refer to:

- Central Mountain Air (IATA: 9M)
- New York State Route 9M
- Northrop N-9M
- Period-after-opening symbol
- AIM-9M, a model of the AIM-9 Sidewinder
- ČZW-9M, a Czech submachine gun made by ČZW
- DE-9M, see D-subminiature
- FN FNP-9m, see FN Herstal FNP
- Kappa 9M, a model of Kappa rocket
- PC-9M, see Pilatus PC-9
- Salmson 9M, several models of Salmson 9
- VF-9M, see VMF-111
- Yak-9M, see Yakovlev Yak-9
- 9M, an aircraft registration prefix for Malaysia

== See also ==
- M9 (disambiguation)
