= Y9 =

Y9 may refer to:

- Shaanxi Y-9, a Chinese transport aircraft
- Lynx Air, former low-cost airline with IATA code Y9
- LNER Class Y9, a class of British steam locomotives

== See also ==
- 9Y (disambiguation)
