= P9 =

P9 or P-9 may refer to:

- Planet Nine, a hypothetical new planet in the far outer solar system
- Boeing XP-9, a prototype fighter aircraft from the 1930s
- Heckler & Koch P9, a semi-automatic pistol
- Springfield Armory P9, a semi-automatic pistol
- Peruvian Airlines IATA airline designator
- P9 (band), a Brazilian boyband
- Power Nine, a set of 9 rare cards from the Magic: The Gathering TCG, widely considered to be the most powerful cards ever printed in the game.
- Psyclon Nine, an aggrotech band
- P-9 Project

== See also ==
- 9P (disambiguation)
