= Bahariye station =

Station of the Istanbul Metro

Bahariye
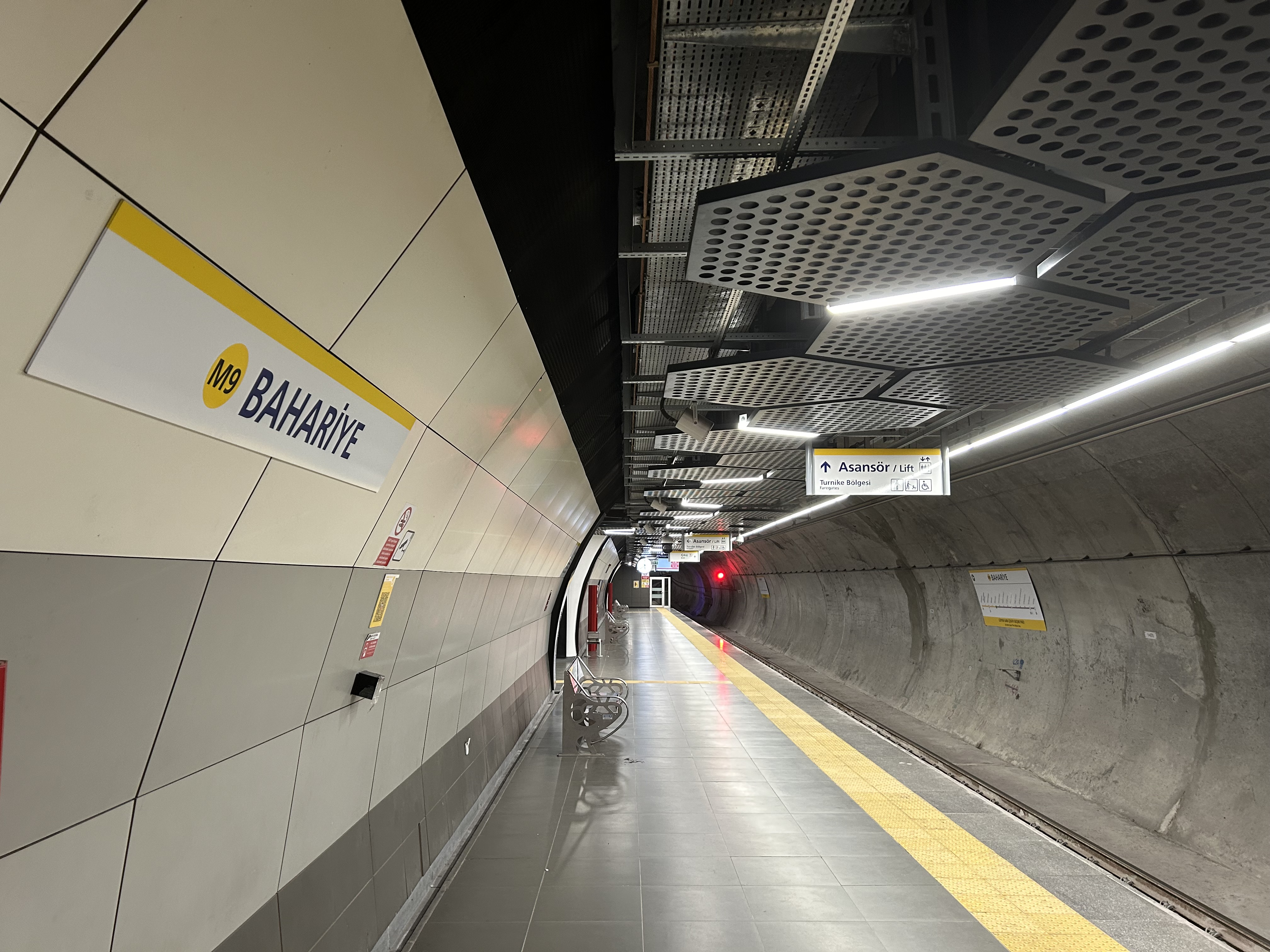
- Platform

General information
- Location: Mehmet Akif Neighborhood, Şehit Albay Rıdvan Özden Street, 34100; Küçükçekmece, Istanbul; Turkey
- Coordinates: 41°3′31″N 28°47′57″E
- System: Istanbul Metro rapid transit station
- Owner: Istanbul Metropolitan Municipality
- Operator: Istanbul Metro
- Line: M9
- Platforms: 1 Island platform
- Tracks: 2
- Connections: İETT Bus: 89M, 98MB, 141K, 141M, MK31; Istanbul Minibus: Topkapı-İkitelli Organize Sanayi, Yüzyıl-Tahtakale, Otogar-İkitelli Organize Sanayi, Şirinevler-Kayaşehir

Construction
- Structure type: Underground
- Parking: No
- Cycle facilities: Yes
- Accessible: Yes

History
- Opened: 29 May 2021 (5 years ago)
- Electrified: 1,500 V DC Overhead line

Services
| Preceding station | Istanbul Metro | Following station |
|---|---|---|
| MASKO towards Olimpiyat | M9 Line | Atatürk Mahallesi towards Ataköy |
Location

Bahariye is an underground station on the M9 line of the Istanbul Metro. It is located on Şehit Albay Rıdvan Özden Street in the Mehmet Akif neighborhood of Küçükçekmece. It was opened on 29 May 2021, and was the southern terminus of the line until the extension to Ataköy opened on 18 March 2024.

== Station layout ==
| Platform level | Northbound | ← toward Olimpiyat (MASKO) |
| Platform level | Island platform, doors will open on the left |
| Platform level | Southbound | toward Ataköy (Atatürk Mahallesi) → |

== Operation information ==
The line operates between 06:00 and 00:00 and train frequency is 9 minutes. The line has no night service.

== Gallery ==
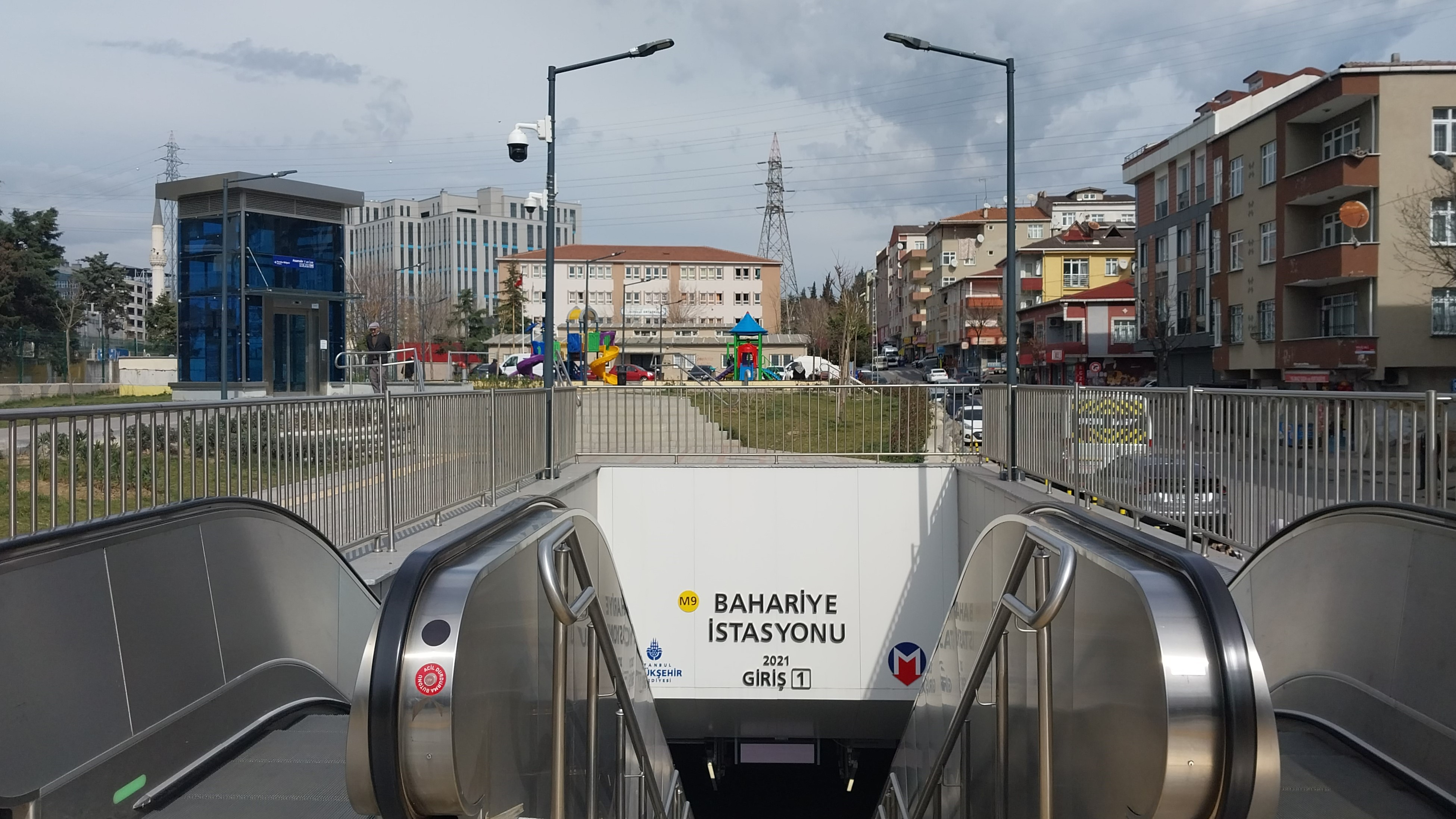
Entrance 1

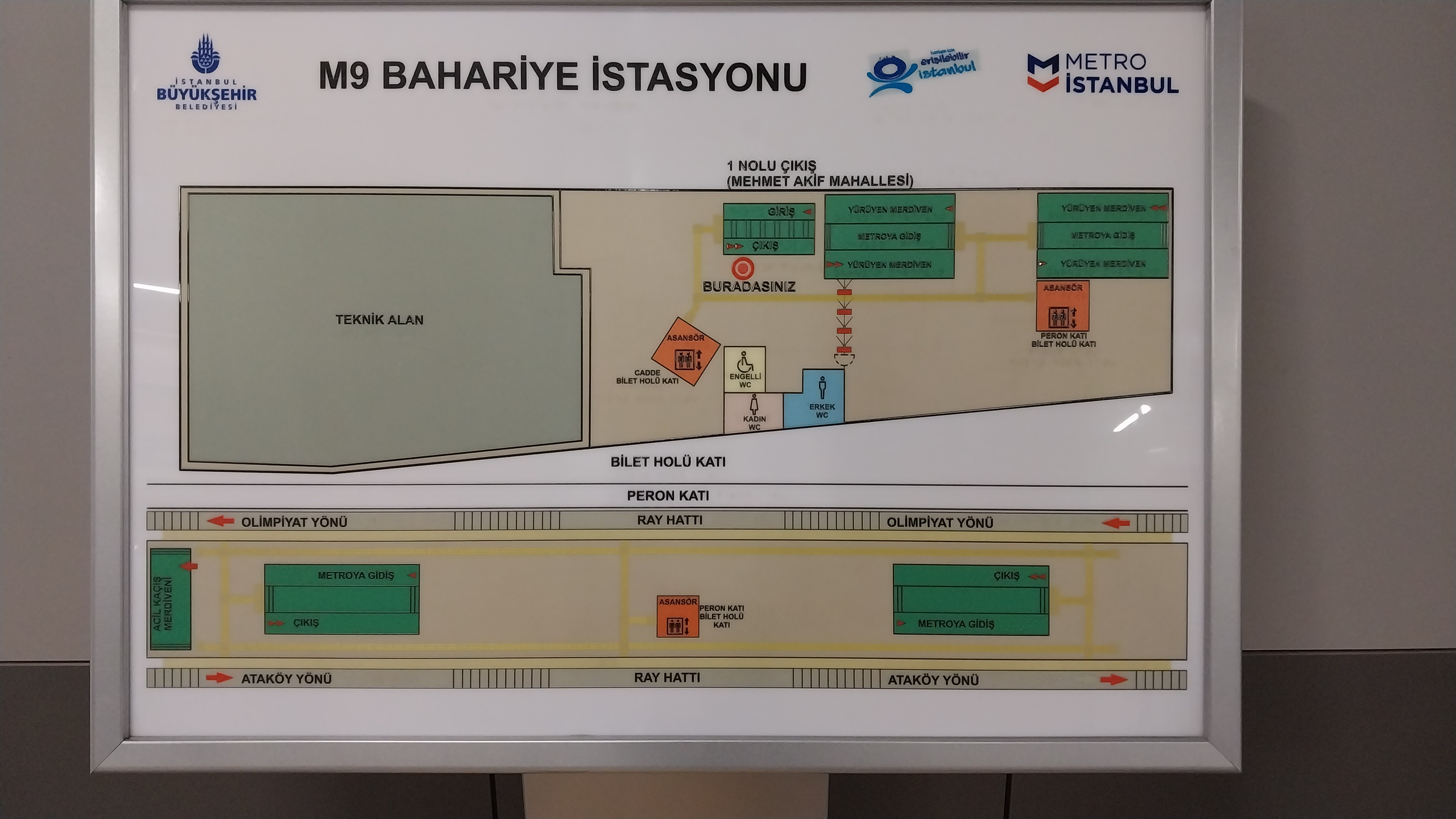
Station diagram

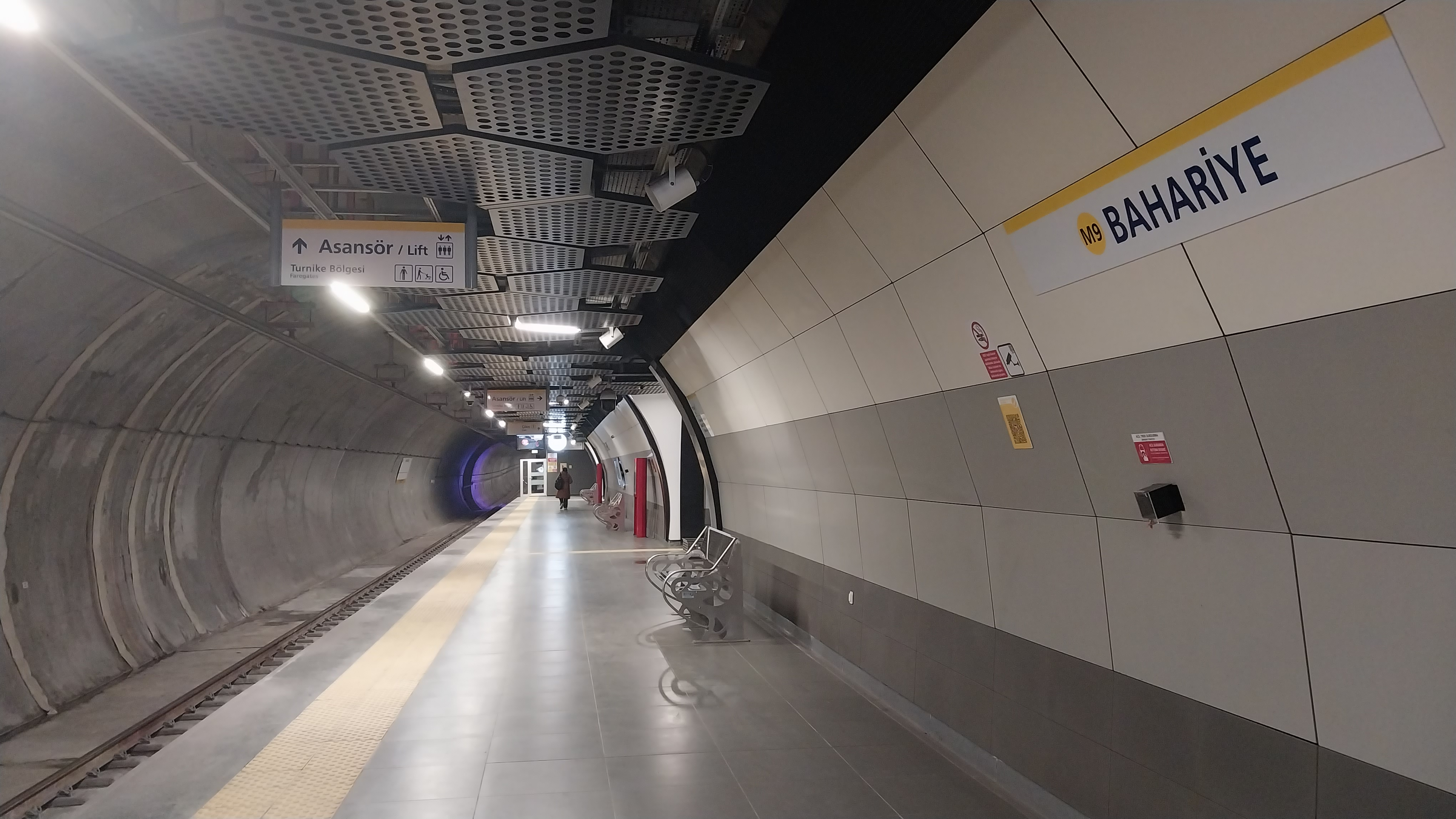
Platform
