= M9 (Istanbul Metro) =

Rapid transit line in Istanbul

M9 Ataköy–Olimpiyat
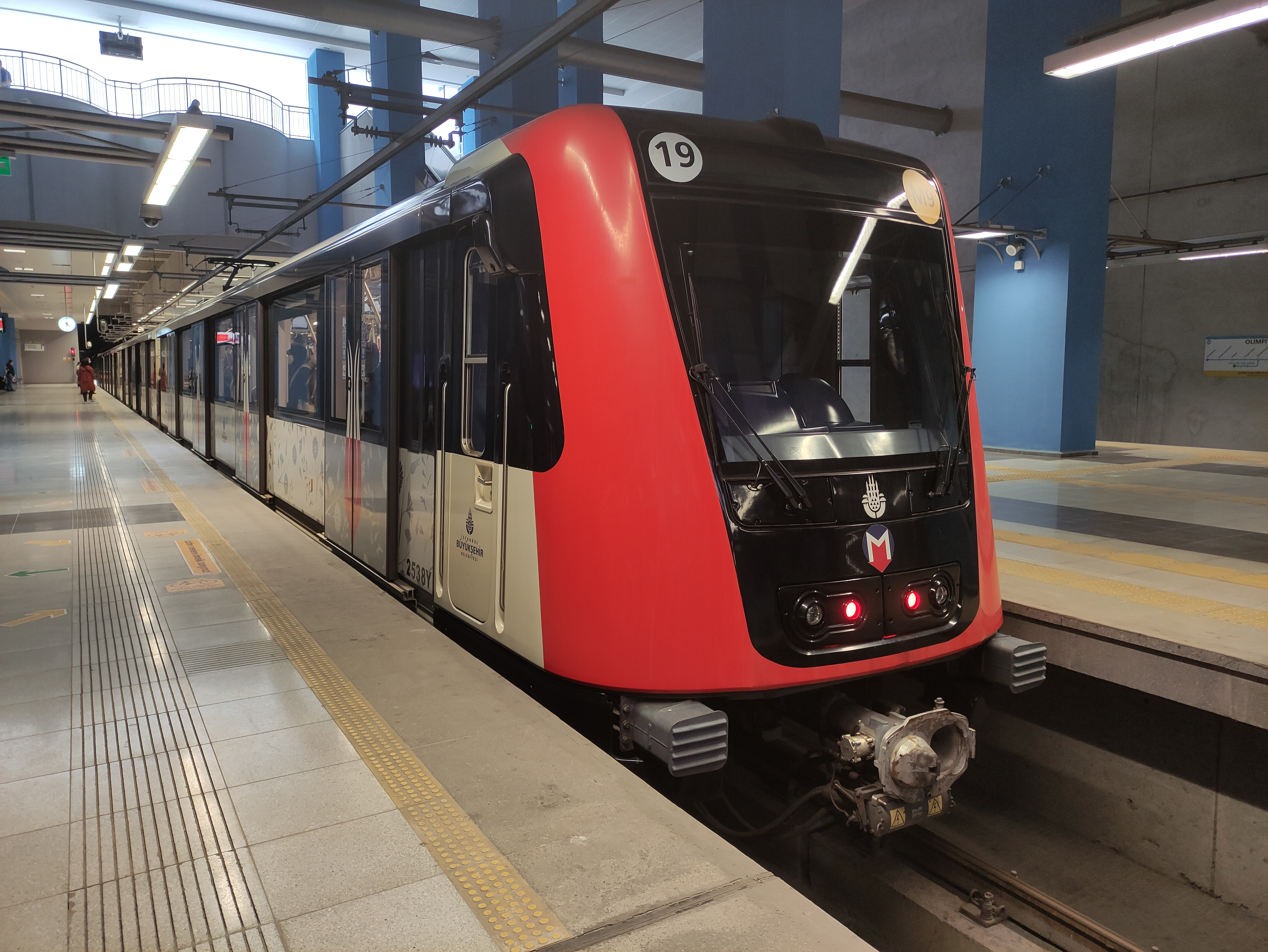

Overview
- Status: Operational
- Owner: Istanbul Metropolitan Municipality
- Line number: M9
- Locale: Istanbul, Turkey
- Termini: Ataköy; Olimpiyat
- Stations: 14
- Website: M9

Service
- Type: Rapid transit
- System: Istanbul Metro
- Services: 1
- Operator: Metro Istanbul A.Ş.
- Depot: Olimpiyatköy

History
- Opened: 22 November 2013 (12 years ago) İkitelli Sanayi - Olimpiyat (as M3 branch); 29 May 2021 (5 years ago)(as M9)
- Last extension: 30 August 2024 (23 months ago) (Mimar Sinan Station)

Technical
- Line length: 17.2 km (10.7 mi)
- Number of tracks: 2
- Track gauge: 1,435 mm (4 ft 8 1/2 in) standard gauge
- Electrification: 1,500 V DC Overhead line
- Operating speed: 80 km/h (50 mph)

The M9, officially referred to as the M9 Ataköy-Olimpiyat line, is a rapid transit line of the Istanbul Metro system in the European part of Istanbul, Turkey. It is colored yellow on the maps and route signs.

The line is currently 17.2 km (10.7 mi) long with 14 stations. It runs along a north-south direction, through five of the city's districts, namely Bakırköy, Bahçelievler, Bağcılar, Küçükçekmece and Başakşehir. The travel time between the end stations is estimated to be 19.5 minutes. It is expected that the metro line will carry around 500,000 riders daily. It will serve about 2.5 million people living in the area and visiting those districts.

Connections to other transit lines are at Ataköy to the Marmaray commuter rail, at Yenibosna to line M1A (Yenikapı–Atatürk Airport), at Çobançeşme to the planned Yenikapı-Sefaköy extension of the M2 line, at Mimar Sinan to the under construction Kirazlı-Halkalı extension of the M1B, at Atatürk Mahallesi to the under construction Mahmutbey-Bahçeşehir-Esenyurt extension of the M7, at İkitelli Sanayi to line M3 (Bakırköy–Kayaşehir), and at Olimpiyat to line M11 (Gayrettepe–Istanbul Airport–Halkalı).

The construction of the metro line began in February 2016. The line consists of two tubes, which were bored by four tunnel boring machines, two at each end. The city of Istanbul approved of a loan of €338 million to complete the construction.

The first phase of the line, running from Bahariye to Olimpiyat, opened on 29 May 2021. This section included two new stations exclusive to the M9, Bahariye and Masko, as well as three stations which formerly were part of a branch of the M3 line (Olimpiyat, Ziya Gökalp Mahallesi, and İkitelli Sanayi), and which opened in November 2013. The full line up to Ataköy opened on 18 March 2024, with Mimar Sinan station opening later on 30 August 2024.

== Opening timeline ==
Stage	Segment	Commencement	Length	Station(s)
1	Olimpiyat – İkitelli Sanayi	22 November 2013 (as branch of M3)	3.8 km (2.36 mi)	3
2	İkitelli Sanayi – Bahariye	29 May 2021	2.1 km (1.30 mi)	2
3	Bahariye – Ataköy	18 March 2024	11.3 km (7.02 mi)	8
3	Mimar Sinan	30 August 2024	–	1

== Stations ==
M9 route diagram

No	Station	District	Transfer	Type	Notes
1	Ataköy	Bakırköy	(Ataköy station); İETT Bus: 71T, 72YT, 72T, 73Y, BN1, MR20	Underground	Baruthane Millet Bahçesi・Ataköy 2,5,6. Kısım neighbourhood
2	Yenibosna	Bakırköy	・ İETT Bus: 31, 31E, 36AY, 36CY, 55Y, 73, 73B, 73F, 73H, 73Y ,76, 76C, 76D, 76V, 78B, 79B, 79F, 79FY, 79G, 79K, 79Ş, 79Y, 82, 89, 89A, 89B, 89K, 89M, 89S, 89YB, 97KZ, 98, 98AB, 98B, 98H, 98MB, 98T, 98TB, E-57, HT10, HT11, HT12, HT20, KÇ2, MR20	Underground	Eski Dostlar Park
3	Çobançeşme	Bahçelievler	(planned); İETT Bus: 31, 31E, 36AY, 73Y, 78B, 79F, 79FY, 79G, 79K, 79Ş, 82, 82S, 89M, 89YB, 98B, 98H, 98MB, 98T, E-57, HT10, HT11	Underground	Kuyumcukent・29 October Street
4	29 Ekim Cumhuriyet	Bahçelievler	İETT Bus: 31, 31E, 36AY, 78B, 79F, 79G, 79K, 79Ş, 89YB,, 98B, 98H, 98T	Underground	29 October Street
5	Doğu Sanayi	Bahçelievler	İETT Bus: 31, 97KZ, 98E, HT12	Underground	29 October Street
6	Mimar Sinan	Bağcılar	(under construction); İETT Bus: 97KZ, 98E, HT1, HT12	Underground	Şehir Korosu Park・Mimar Sinan Street
7	15 Temmuz	Bağcılar	İETT Bus: 97, 97GE, 97M, 98E, HT12, MK42	Underground	Gülbahar Street
8	Halkalı Caddesi	Küçükçekmece	İETT Bus: 36AY, 73Y, 78ZB, 79FY, 79K, 89C, 89T, 98H, 98T, 141A, H-1	Underground	212 AVM・Basın Ekspres Road
9	Atatürk Mahallesi	Küçükçekmece	(under construction); İETT Bus: 36AY, 76O, 78ZB, 79FY, 79K, 89C, 89F, 89M, 98, 98H, 98KM, 98MB, 141A, 141K, 141M, 143, H-3, HS3, MK19, MK31	Underground	
10	Bahariye	Küçükçekmece	İETT Bus: 89M, 98MB, 141K, 141M, 144M, MK31	Underground	Rıdvan Özden Park
11	MASKO	Başakşehir	İETT Bus: 76A, 76O, 78B, 78G, 82S, 89F, 98H, 142E, 144M, 146A, 146K, 146M, 146T, H-3, MK31	Underground	Masko・Mall of İstanbul
12	İkitelli Sanayi	Başakşehir	İETT Bus: 31Y, 82S MK31	Underground	Free transfer to the line.
13	Ziya Gökalp Mahallesi	Başakşehir	İETT Bus: 31Y, 78ZB, 78Ş, 79Ş, 98, 98KM, 143, MK19	Underground	
14	Olimpiyat	Başakşehir	(Olimpiyatköy); İETT Bus: 36AS, 36F, 79FY, 79K, HS3, MK2, MK11, MK12, MK13, MK14, MK15, MK16, MR52	Underground	Atatürk Olympic Stadium
