= M9 road =

M9 road or similar terms may refer to:

== Metropolitan routes in South Africa ==
- M9 (Cape Town)
- M9 (Durban)
- M9 (East London)
- M9 (Johannesburg)
- M9 (Port Elizabeth)
- M9 (Pretoria)

== Roads elsewhere ==
- Coomera Connector, Queensland, Australia
- Highway M09 (Ukraine)
- M-9 (Michigan highway), USA, a former state highway route
- M9 highway (Russia), another name for the Baltic Highway
- M9 motorway (Ireland), a motorway-grade segment of the N9 road
- M9 motorway (Pakistan), also known as Super Highway
- M9 motorway (Scotland)
- M9 road (Malawi)
- M9 road (Zambia)
