= Salmson 9 =

Salmson 9 can refer to:

- 9-cylinder Salmson water-cooled aero-engines from 1908 until 1920
- 9-cylinder Salmson air-cooled aero-engines of 1917 onwards
- 9-cylinder Salmson air-cooled aero-engines of 1920 onwards
