= Olimpiyat station =

Station of the Istanbul Metro

Olimpiyat
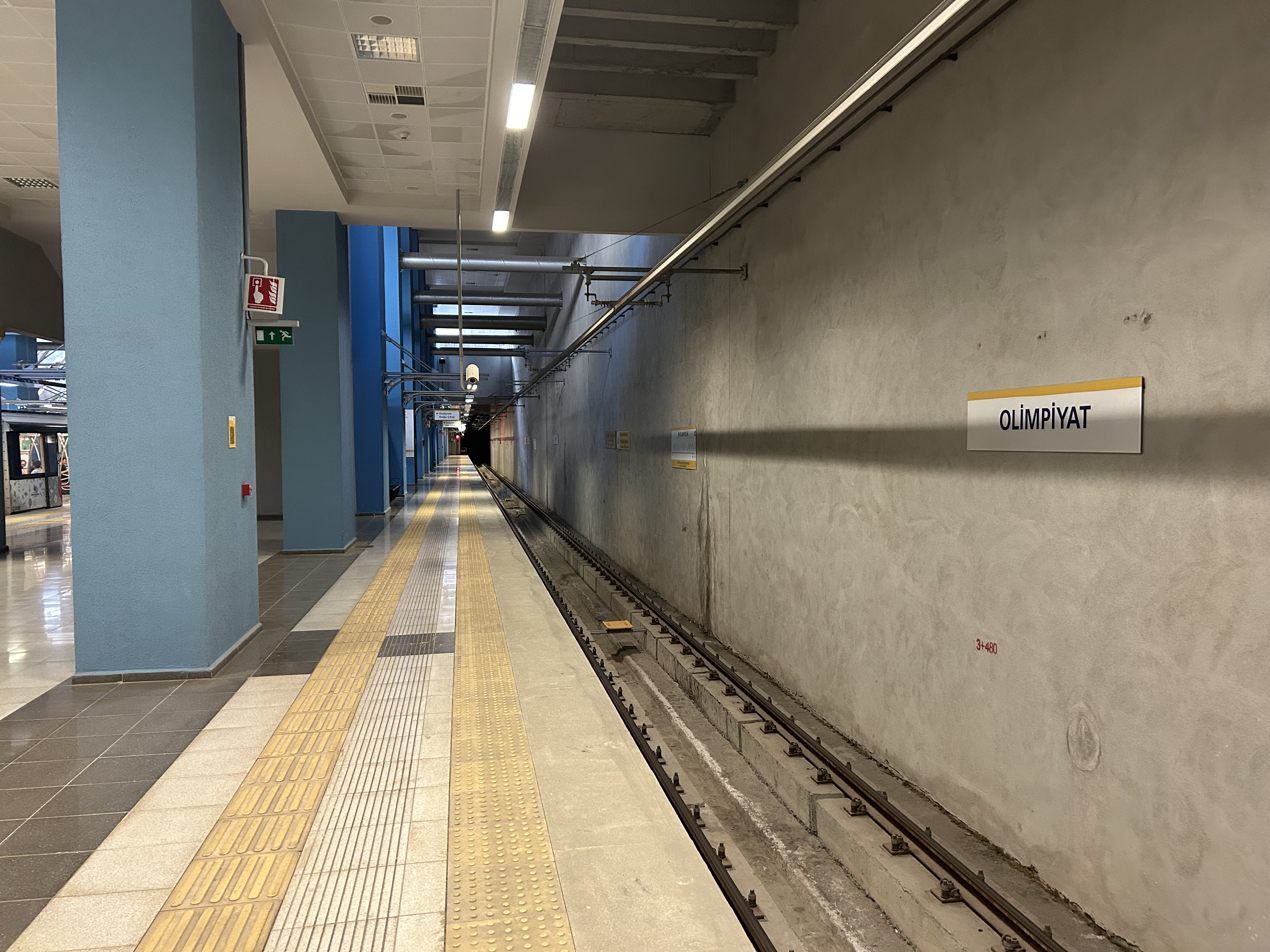
- Platform with side track

General information
- Location: Ziya Gökalp Neighborhood, Atatürk Olympic Stadium, 34490; Başakşehir, Istanbul; Turkey
- Coordinates: 41°4′46″N 28°46′3″E
- System: Istanbul Metro rapid transit station
- Owner: Istanbul Metropolitan Municipality
- Line: M9
- Platforms: 2 Island platforms
- Tracks: 3
- Connections: M11 (Olimpiyatköy); İETT Bus: Stat Yolu: 36AS, 79FY, 79K, HS1; Olimpiyatköy: 36F, MK2, MK11, MK12, MK13, MK14, MK15, MK16

Construction
- Structure type: Underground
- Parking: No
- Cycle facilities: Yes
- Accessible: Yes

History
- Opened: 22 November 2013 (12 years ago) (As part of M3)
- Electrified: 1500 V DC Overhead line

Services
Preceding station	Istanbul Metro	Following station
Terminus	M9 Line	Ziya Gökalp Mahallesi towards Ataköy
Transfer at Olimpiyatköy
Halkalı Stadı towards Halkalı	M11 Line	Kayaşehir Merkez towards Gayrettepe
Location

Olimpiyat is an underground rapid transit station in Başakşehir, Istanbul on the M9 of the Istanbul Metro and is also its northern terminus. It was first opened on 22 November 2013 as part of M3 but in 2021 it was made a part of M9. It is located just north of the Atatürk Olympic Stadium but within the Olympic stadium complex. The station consists of two island platforms servicing three tracks. West of the station lies the Olimpiyat Yard, which houses the dispatcher of the M3 and the M9 line. The station is an interchange station with the M11 line at Olimpiyatköy, which uses a different station name but provides an out-of-station transfer with the M9 line.

== Layout ==
Track 3	No passenger service
Island platform, doors will open on the right
Track 2	toward Ataköy →
Island platform, doors will open on the left
Track 1	No passenger service

== Operation information ==
The M9 line operates between 06:00 and 00:00 and train frequency is 9 minutes. The line has no night service.

== Nearby places of interest ==
- Atatürk Olympic Stadium – the largest stadium in Turkey.
