= Ataköy station =

Station of the Istanbul Metro

Ataköy
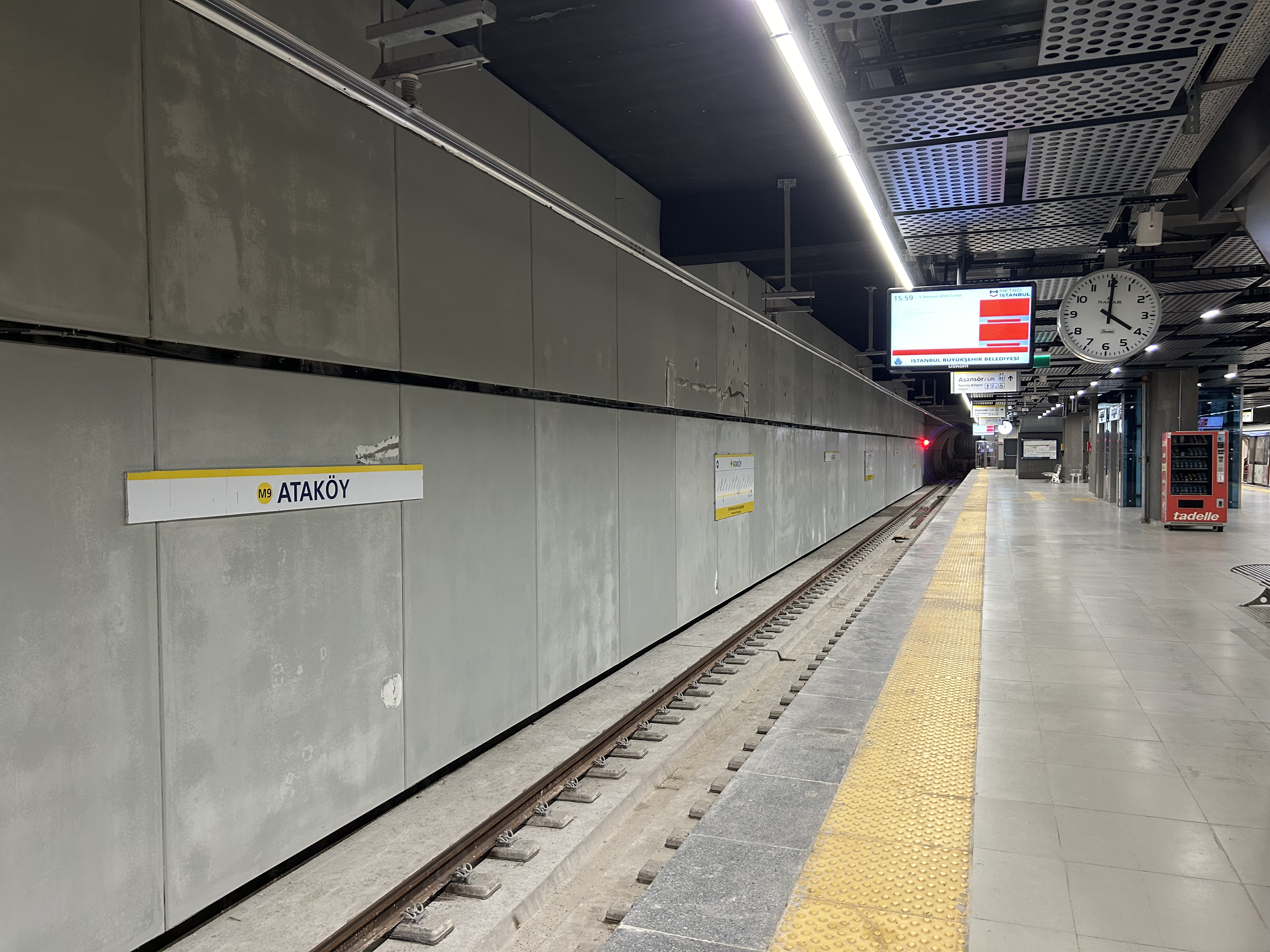
- M9 platform

General information
- Location: Ataköy 2-5-6. Kısım Neighborhood, Dumlupınar Street, 34158; Bakırköy, Istanbul; Turkey
- Coordinates: 40°58′48″N 28°51′22″E
- System: Istanbul Metro rapid transit station
- Owner: Istanbul Metropolitan Municipality
- Lines: Marmaray (Ataköy Railway Station); M9
- Platforms: 2 island platforms (1 for each line)
- Tracks: 4
- Connections: İETT Bus: 71T, 72YT, 72T, 73Y, BN1, MR20; Istanbul Minibus: Bakırköy-Yeşilköy; Istanbul Dolmuş: Taksim-Yenibosna

Construction
- Structure type: At-grade (Marmaray); Underground (M9)
- Parking: No
- Cycle facilities: Yes
- Accessible: Yes

History
- Opened: Marmaray: 12 March 2019 (7 years ago); M9: 18 March 2024 (2 years ago)
- Electrified: 750 V DC Overhead line

Services
| Preceding station | Istanbul Metro | Following station |
|---|---|---|
| Yenibosna towards Olimpiyat | M9 Line | Terminus |
| Preceding station | TCDD Taşımacılık | Following station |
| Yeşilyurt towards Halkalı | Marmaray | Bakırköy towards Gebze |
Location

Ataköy is a station on the M9 line of the Istanbul Metro and a railway station on the Marmaray line in Bakırköy, Istanbul. The at-grade station opened on 12 March 2019, whilst the M9 station opened on 18 March 2024. It is the southern terminus of the M9 line and the western intermediate terminus of the Marmaray.

== Layout ==
M9

| Northbound | ← toward Olimpiyat (Yenibosna) |
Island platform, doors will open on the left or right
| Northbound | ← toward Olimpiyat (Yenibosna) |

Marmaray

| Westbound | ← toward Halkalı (Yeşilyurt) ← termination platform |
Island platform, doors will open on the left
| Eastbound | toward Pendik or Gebze (Bakırköy) → |

== Gallery ==
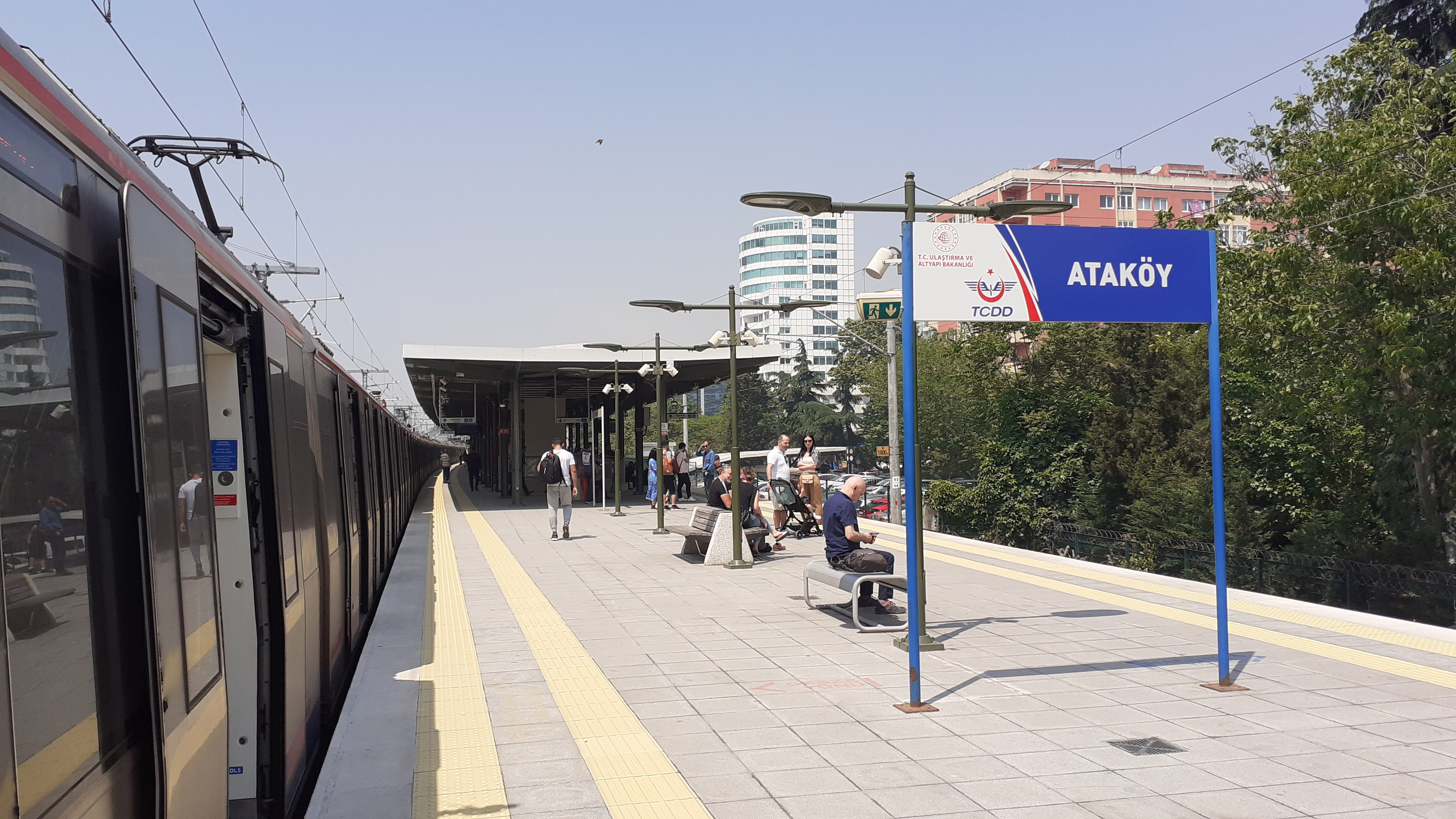
Marmaray platform

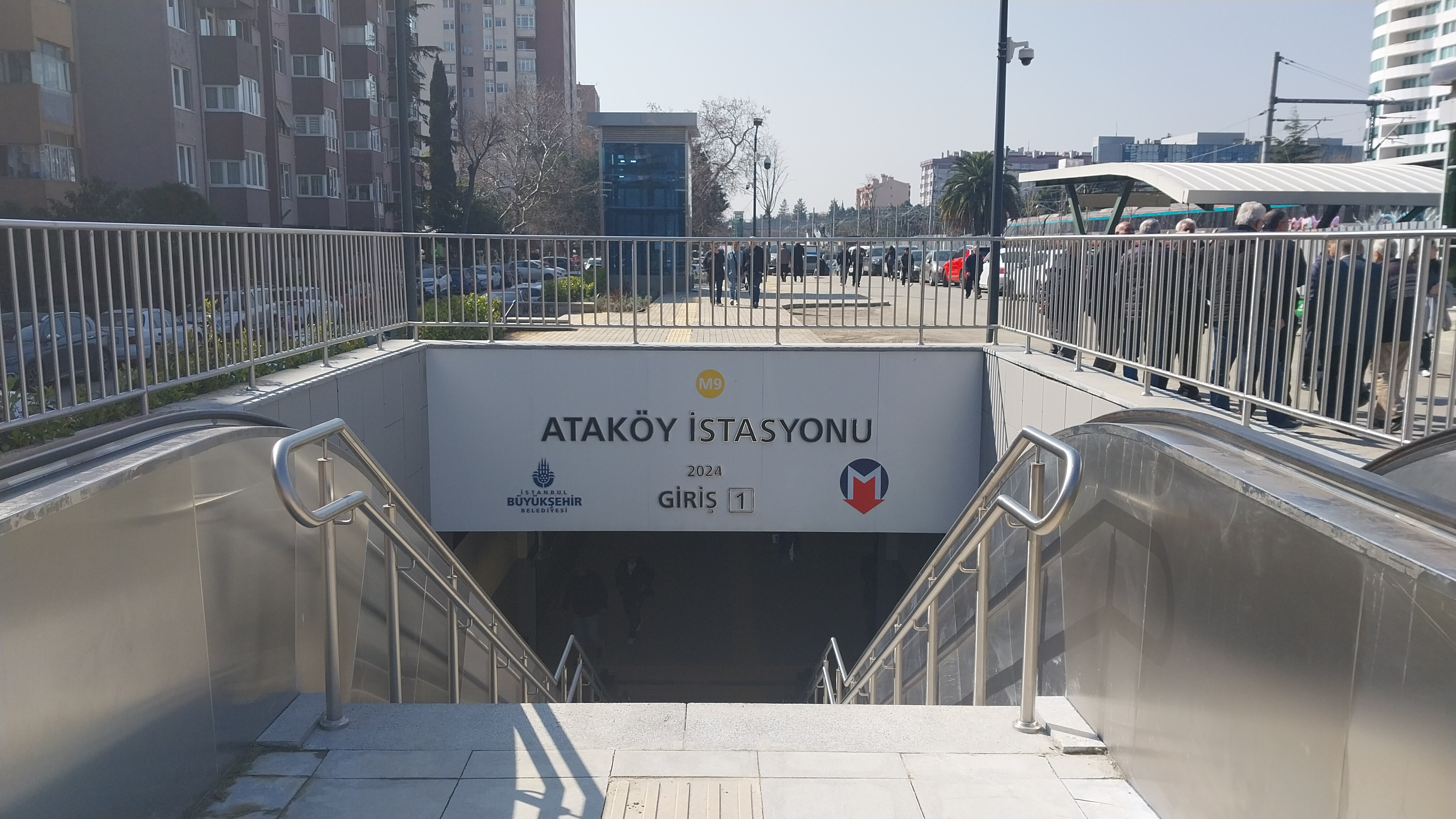
Entrance 1 of the M9 station, with the Marmaray platforms visible on the right

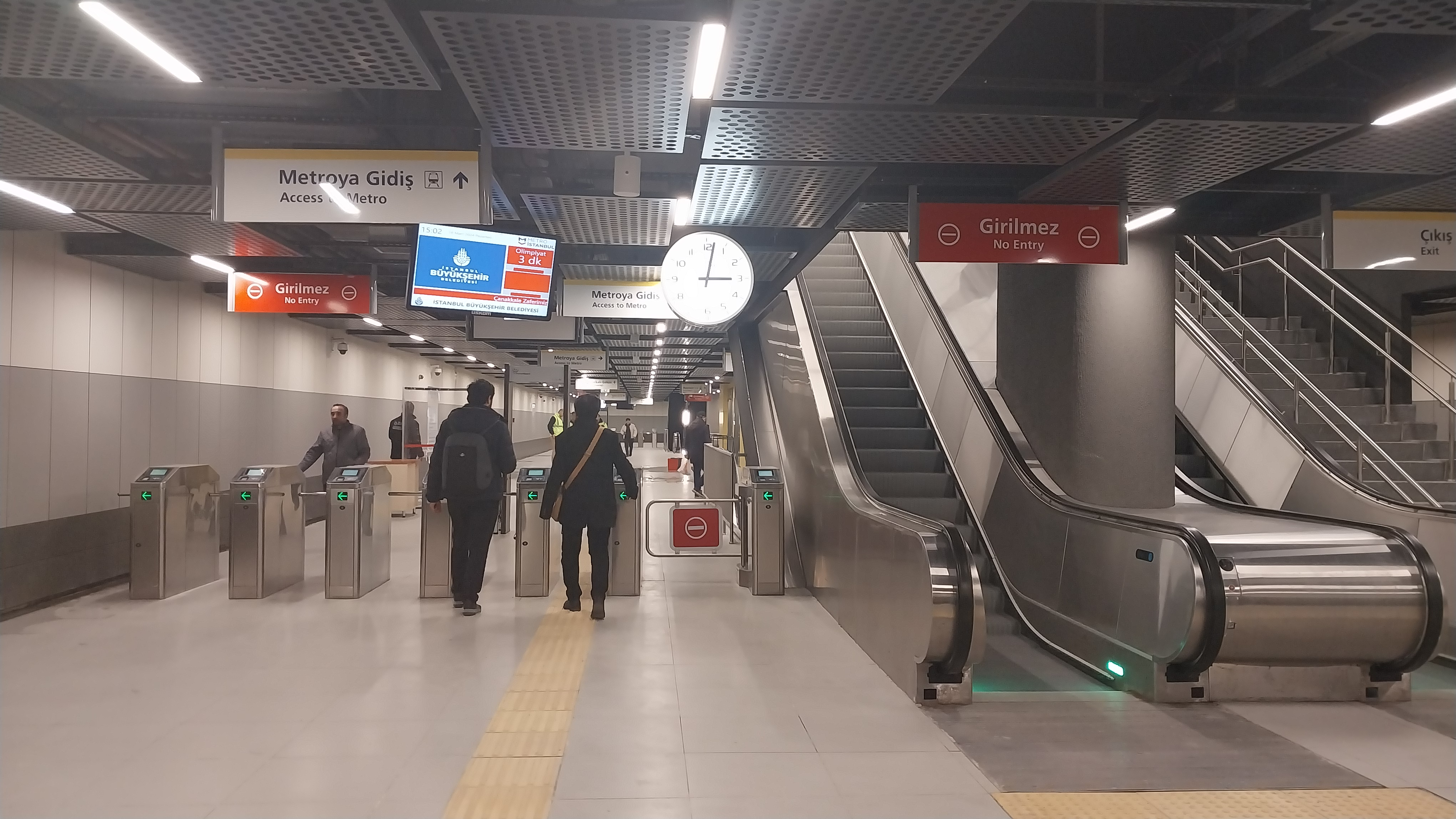
M9 ticket hall

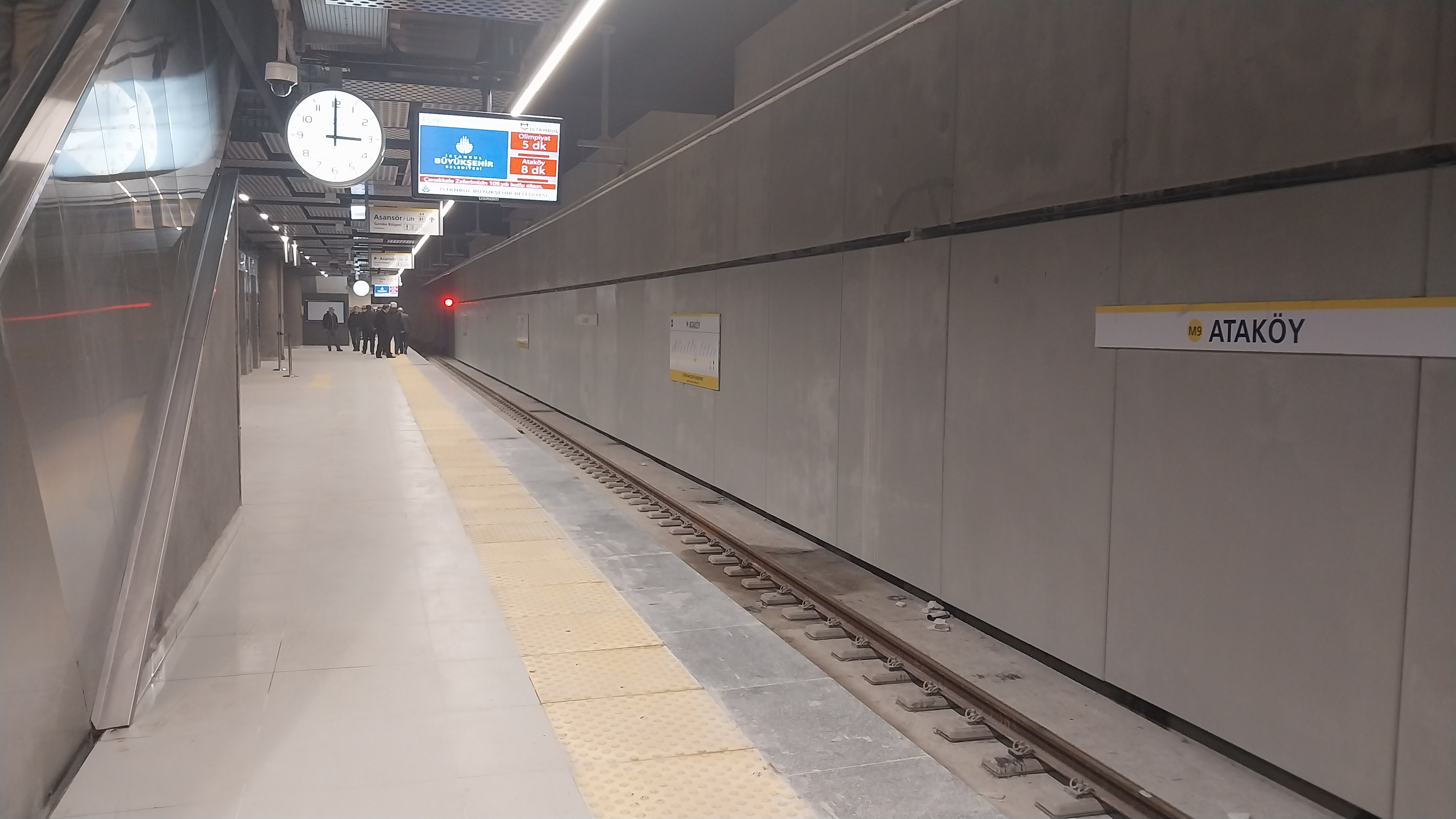
M9 platform

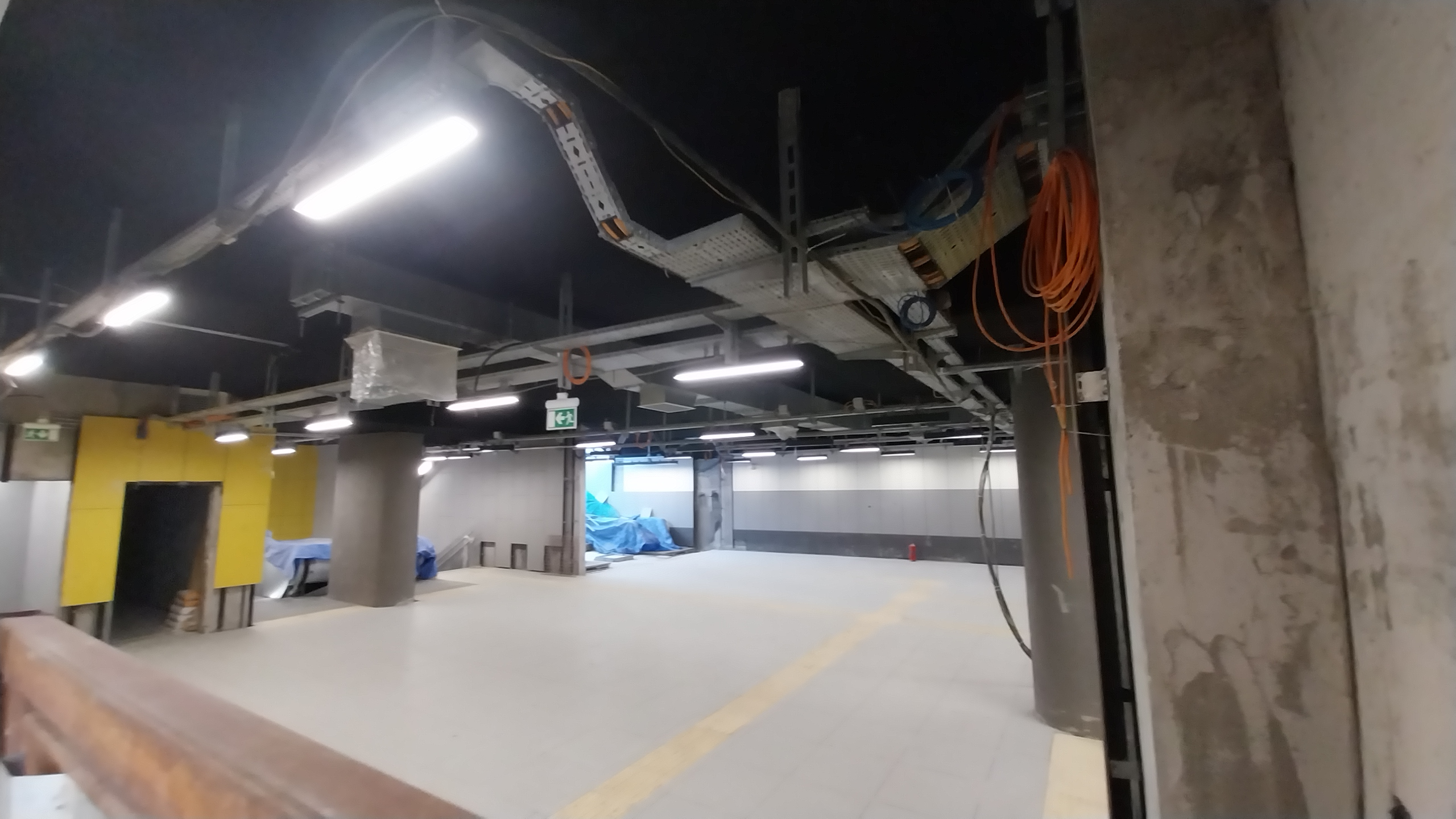
M9 construction in 2022

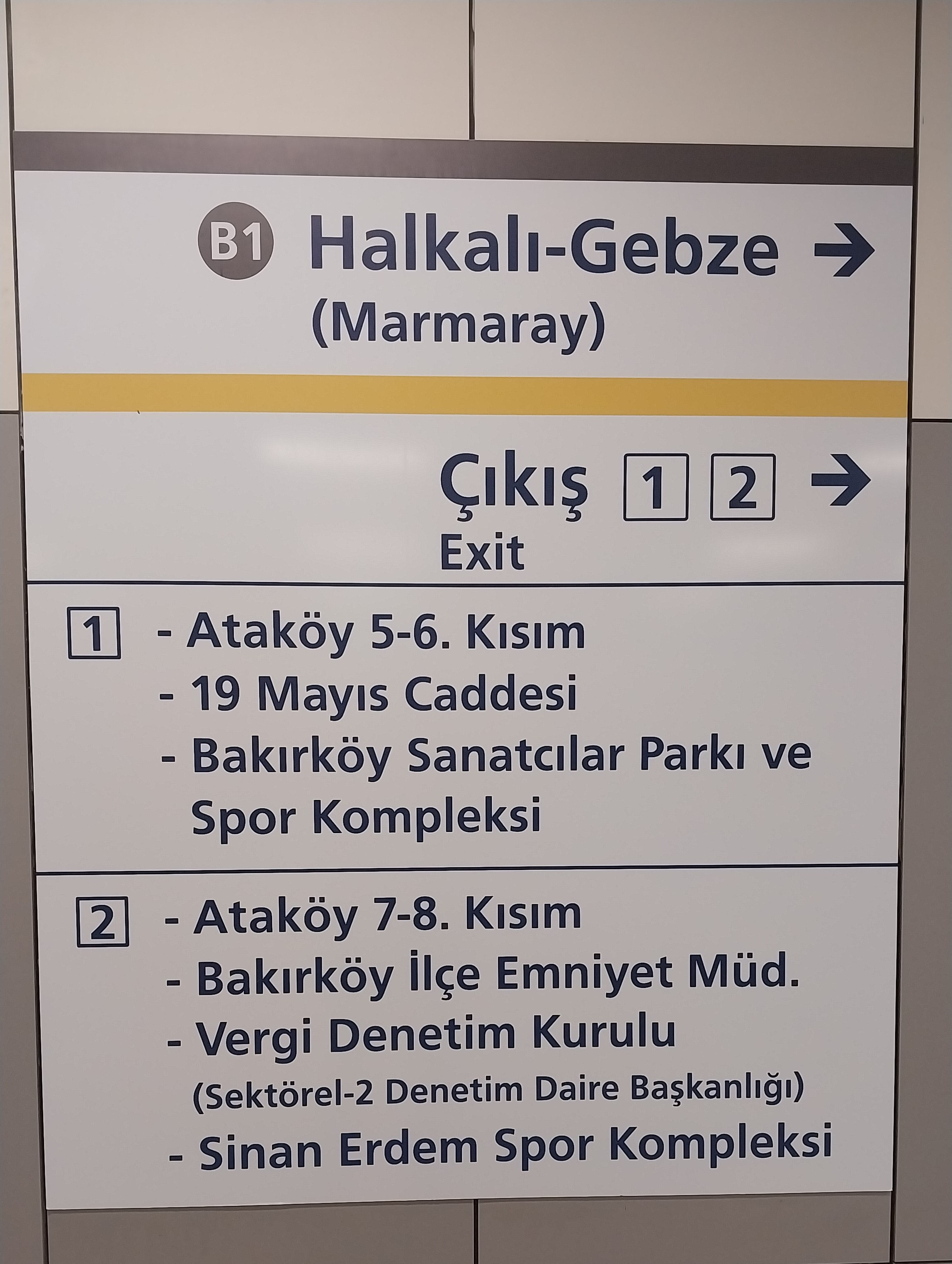
Exit and interchange sign
