= List of districts of Istanbul =

This is a list of districts of Istanbul in Turkey (Turkish: İstanbul'un ilçeleri) as of 31 December 2025. The number of the districts increased from 32 to 39 shortly before the 2009 local elections.

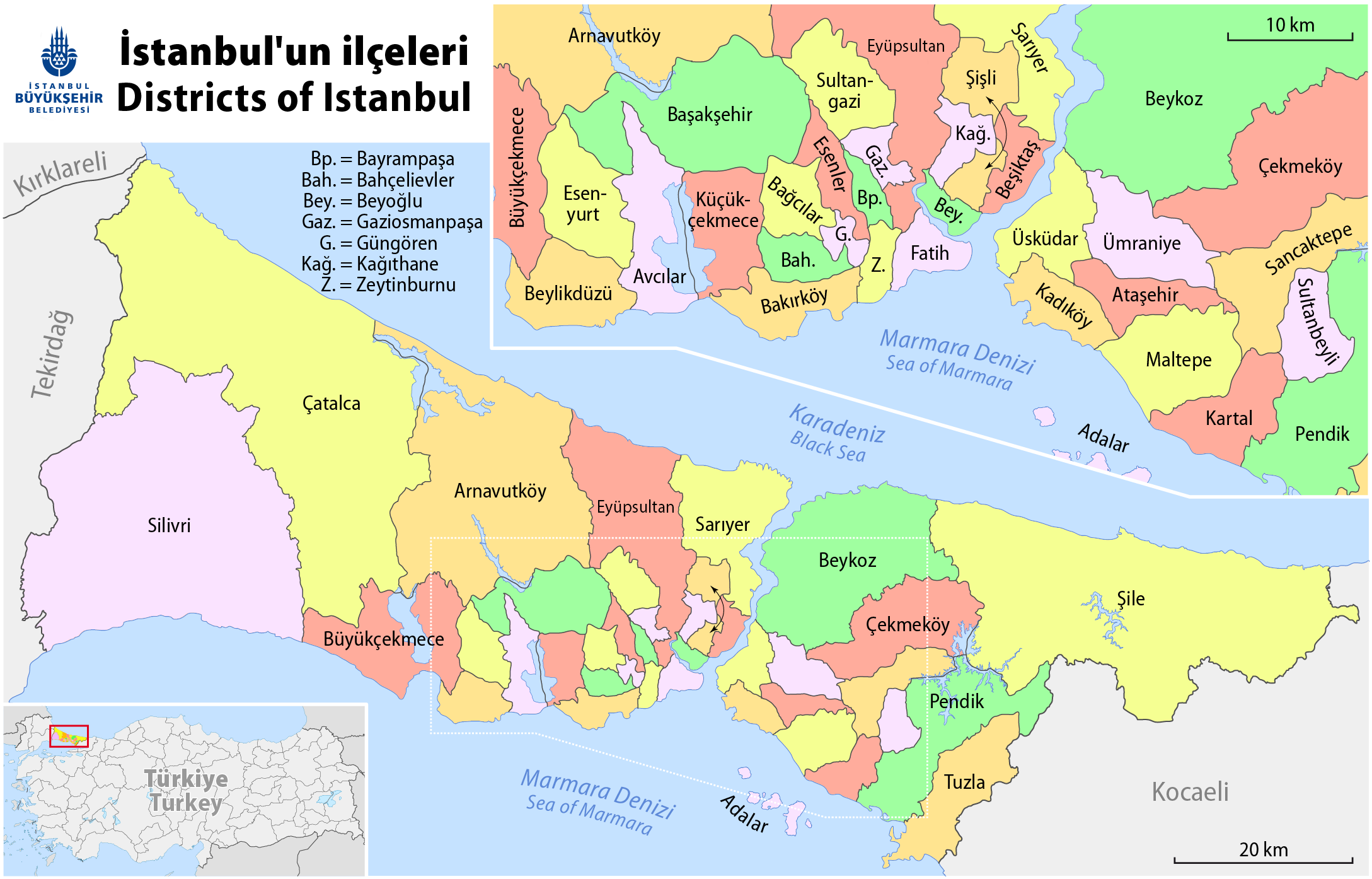
Map of the districts of Istanbul

Nr.Plates (İlçe Kayıt)	Districts of Istanbul	Population 31.12.2025	Area (km^{2})	Density (/km^{2})
1103	Adalar	17,489	11.05	1,583
2048	Arnavutköy	358,469	450.35	796
2049	Ataşehir	412,125	25.23	16,335
2003	Avcılar	440,663	42.01	10,489
2004	Bağcılar	707,635	22.36	31,647
2005	Bahçelievler	539,035	16.62	32,433
1166	Bakırköy	218,204	29.64	7,362
2050	Başakşehir	536,797	104.30	5,147
1886	Bayrampaşa	272,978	9.61	28,406
1183	Beşiktaş	165,895	18.01	9,211
1185	Beykoz	246,833	310.36	795
2051	Beylikdüzü	422,988	37.78	11,196
1186	Beyoğlu	215,991	8.91	24,241
1782	Büyükçekmece	283,239	139.17	2,035
1237	Çatalca	81,143	1,115.13	73
2052	Çekmeköy	315,959	148.09	2,134
2016	Esenler	419,878	18.43	22,782
2053	Esenyurt	1,003,905	43.13	23,276
1325	Eyüpsultan	425,216	228.42	1,862
1327	Fatih	351,786	15.59	22,565
1336	Gaziosmanpaşa	478,395	11.76	40,680
2010	Güngören	251,242	7.21	34,846
1421	Kadıköy	458,573	25.09	18,277
1810	Kağıthane	446,420	14.87	30,022
1449	Kartal	475,630	38.54	12,341
1823	Küçükçekmece	785,270	37.54	20,918
2012	Maltepe	525,044	52.97	9,912
1835	Pendik	752,033	179.99	4,178
2054	Sancaktepe	507,500	62.42	8,130
1604	Sarıyer	344,883	175.39	1,966
1622	Silivri	240,029	869.52	276
2014	Sultanbeyli	378,908	29.14	13,003
2055	Sultangazi	529,306	36.30	14,581
1659	Şile	50,090	781.72	64
1663	Şişli	261,959	10.71	24,459
2015	Tuzla	313,865	123.63	2,539
1852	Ümraniye	728,913	45.31	16,087
1708	Üsküdar	514,294	35.33	14,557
1739	Zeytinburnu	275,471	11.59	23,768
Europe (25 districts)		10,056,797	3,474.35	2,895
Asia (14 districts)		5,697,256	1,868.87	3,049
Total		15,754,053	5,343.22	2,948

== Population ==
Asian Side
European Side

District	1965	1970	1975	1980	1985	1990	1997	2007	2012	2017	2022
Adalar	15,219	17,600	13,171	18,232	14,785	19,413	16,171	10,460	14,552	14,907	16,690
Arnavutköy	no data	no data	no data	no data	no data	no data	no data	no data	206,299	261,655	326,452
Ataşehir	no data	no data	no data	no data	no data	no data	no data	no data	395,758	423,372	423,127
Avcılar	no data	no data	no data	no data	no data	no data	214,621	323,596	395,274	435,682	452,132
Bağcılar	no data	no data	no data	no data	no data	no data	487,896	719,267	749,024	748,483	740,069
Bahçelievler	no data	no data	no data	no data	no data	no data	442,877	571,711	600,162	598,454	594,350
Bakırköy	168,694	341,743	568,799	882,505	1,238,342	1,328,276	222,336	214,821	221,336	222,370	226,685
Başakşehir	no data	no data	no data	no data	no data	no data	no data	no data	316,176	396,729	514,900
Bayrampaşa	no data	no data	no data	no data	no data	212,570	240,427	272,196	269,774	274,197	275,314
Beşiktaş	107,442	136,105	174,931	188,117	204,911	192,210	202,783	191,513	186,067	185,447	175,190
Beykoz	67,758	76,385	92,767	114,812	136,063	163,786	193,067	241,833	246,352	251,087	247,875
Beylikdüzü	no data	no data	no data	no data	no data	no data	no data	no data	229,115	314,670	412,835
Beyoğlu	218,985	225,850	230,532	223,360	245,999	229,000	231,826	247,256	246,152	236,606	225,920
Büyükçekmece	no data	no data	no data	no data	no data	142,910	287,569	688,774	201,077	243,474	277,181
Çatalca	62,005	69,523	71,459	89,057	117,380	64,241	73,227	89,158	63,467	69,057	77,468
Çekmeköy	no data	no data	no data	no data	no data	no data	no data	no data	193,182	248,859	296,066
Eminönü	137,849	136,997	122,885	93,324	93,383	83,444	65,246	32,557	no data	no data	no data
Esenler	no data	no data	no data	no data	no data	no data	344,428	517,235	458,694	454,569	445,421
Esenyurt	no data	no data	no data	no data	no data	no data	no data	no data	553,369	846,492	983,571
Eyüpsultan	168,417	238,831	297,218	331,507	377,187	211,986	254,028	325,532	356,512	381,114	422,913
Fatih	344,602	417,662	504,127	474,578	497,459	462,464	432,590	422,941	428,857	433,873	368,227
Gaziosmanpaşa	89,538	125,667	160,949	219,026	289,841	393,667	649,648	1,013,048	488,258	497,959	495,998
Güngören	no data	no data	no data	no data	no data	no data	273,915	318,545	307,573	296,967	282,692
Kadıköy	166,425	241,593	362,578	468,217	577,863	648,282	699,379	744,670	521,005	451,453	483,064
Kağıthane	no data	no data	no data	no data	no data	269,042	317,238	418,229	421,356	442,694	455,943
Kartal	97,803	168,822	287,105	413,839	572,546	611,532	362,175	541,209	443,293	463,433	483,418
Küçükçekmece	no data	no data	no data	no data	no data	479,419	460,388	785,392	721,911	770,393	808,957
Maltepe	no data	no data	no data	no data	no data	no data	335,539	415,117	460,955	497,586	528,544
Pendik	no data	no data	no data	no data	no data	295,651	339,759	520,486	625,797	698,260	750,435
Sancaktepe	no data	no data	no data	no data	no data	no data	no data	no data	278,998	402,391	489,848
Sarıyer	52,445	67,902	85,262	117,659	147,503	171,872	229,600	276,407	289,959	344,876	350,454
Şile	18,098	19,427	18,648	20,424	19,310	25,372	27,385	25,169	30,218	35,131	43,464
Silivri	35,380	37,443	40,106	53,032	55,625	77,599	98,873	125,364	150,183	180,524	217,163
Şişli	268,143	365,621	440,572	467,685	526,526	250,478	257,049	314,684	318,217	274,196	276,528
Sultanbeyli	no data	no data	no data	no data	no data	no data	144,932	272,758	302,388	329,985	358,201
Sultangazi	no data	no data	no data	no data	no data	no data	no data	no data	492,212	528,514	542,531
Tuzla	no data	no data	no data	no data	no data	no data	93,975	165,239	197,657	252,923	288,878
Ümraniye	no data	no data	no data	no data	no data	301,257	498,952	897,260	645,238	699,901	732,379
Üsküdar	135,056	171,267	254,895	366,186	490,185	395,623	472,124	582,666	535,916	533,570	524,452
Yalova	37,090	42,689	55,036	75,787	90,228	113,417	no data	no data	no data	no data	no data
Zeytinburnu	102,874	117,905	123,548	124,543	147,849	165,679	228,786	288,743	292,407	287,378	292,616
Europe	1,756,374	2,281,249	2,820,388	3,264,393	3,942,005	4,734,857	6,015,351	8,156,969	8,963,431	9,726,373	10,241,510
Asia	537,449	737,783	1,084,200	1,477,497	1,900,980	2,574,333	3,183,458	4,416,867	4,891,309	5,302,858	5,666,441
Total	2,293,823	3,019,032	3,904,588	4,741,890	5,842,985	7,309,190	9,198,809	12,573,836	13,854,740	15,029,231	15,907,951

== Historical information ==
Pera (now Beyoğlu) and Galata in the late 19th and early 20th centuries were a part of the Municipality of the Sixth Circle (French: Municipalité du VI^{me} Cercle), established under the laws of 11 Jumada al-Thani (Djem. II) and 24 Shawwal (Chev.) 1274, in 1858; the organisation of the central city in the city walls, "Stamboul" (Turkish: İstanbul), was not affected by these laws. All of Constantinople (all of which today is now Istanbul) was in the Prefecture of the City of Constantinople (French: Préfecture de la Ville de Constantinople).

== See also ==
- List of neighbourhoods of Istanbul
