= List of municipalities in Istanbul Province =

This is the List of municipalities in Istanbul Province, Turkey as of October 2007.

== Municipalities ==
List is sorted alphabetically A-Z, as Districts->Municipalities.

District	Municipality
Adalar	Adalar
Avcılar	Avcılar
Bağcılar	Bağcılar
Bahçelievler	Bahçelievler
Bakırköy	Bakırköy
Bayrampaşa	Bayrampaşa
Beşiktaş	Beşiktaş
Beykoz	Beykoz
Beykoz	Çavuşbaşı
Beyoğlu	Beyoğlu
Büyükçekmece	Bahçeşehir
Büyükçekmece	Beylikdüzü
Büyükçekmece	Büyükçekmece
Büyükçekmece	Esenyurt
Büyükçekmece	Gürpınar
Büyükçekmece	Kıraç
Büyükçekmece	Kumburgaz
Büyükçekmece	Mimarsinan
Büyükçekmece	Tepecik
Büyükçekmece	Yakuplu
Çatalca	Binkılıç
Çatalca	Çatalca
Çatalca	Çiftlikköy
Çatalca	Durusu
Çatalca	Hadımköy
Çatalca	Karacaköy
Çatalca	Muratbey
Eminönü	Eminönü
Esenler	Esenler
Eyüp	Eyüp
Eyüp	Göktürk
Fatih	Fatih
Gaziosmanpaşa	Arnavutköy
Gaziosmanpaşa	Boğazköy
Gaziosmanpaşa	Bolluca
Gaziosmanpaşa	Gaziosmanpaşa
Gaziosmanpaşa	Haraççı
Gaziosmanpaşa	Taşoluk
Güngören	Güngören
Kadıköy	Kadıköy
Kağıthane	Kağıthane
Kartal	Kartal
Kartal	Samandıra
Küçükçekmece	Küçükçekmece
Maltepe	Maltepe
Pendik	Pendik
Sarıyer	Bahçeköy
Sarıyer	Sarıyer
Şile	Ağva
Şile	Şile
Silivri	Büyükçavuşlu
Silivri	Celaliye
Silivri	Çanta
Silivri	Değirmenköy
Silivri	Gümüşyaka
Silivri	Kavaklı
Silivri	Ortaköy
Silivri	Selimpaşa
Silivri	Silivri
Şişli	Şişli
Sultanbeyli	Sultanbeyli
Tuzla	Akfırat
Tuzla	Orhanlı
Tuzla	Tuzla
Ümraniye	Alemdağ
Ümraniye	Çekme
Ümraniye	Ömerli
Ümraniye	Sarıgazi
Ümraniye	Taşdelen
Ümraniye	Ümraniye
Ümraniye	Yenidoğan
Üsküdar	Üsküdar
Zeytinburnu	Zeytinburnu

== Changes in 2014 ==
According to Law act no. 6360, belde (town) municipalities within provinces with more than 750,000 population (so called Metropolitan municipalities) were abolished as of 30 March 2014. 32 belde municipalities in the above list are now defunct. The list is kept for historical reference.
