= Karadolap =

Karadolap is a neighborhood (mahalle) in the district of Eyüpsultan, Istanbul, Turkey. Its population is 27,766 (2019).

Karadolap is bordered on the north and northeast by the Eyüpsultan neighborhoods of Akşemsettin and Çırçır; on the east, southeast, and south by the Eyüpsultan neighborhoods of Alibeyköy and Esentepe and the Gaziosmanpaşa neighborhoods of Yıldıztabya and Fevzi Çakmak; and on the west by the Eyüpsultan neighborhood of Yeşilpınar.

== Name ==
The area is sometimes called the Saya Yolu or Saya Yokuşu neighborhood because of Saya Yolu Caddesi (Saya Road Avenue), which forms part of the northern boundary of the neighborhood, and Saya Yokuşu (Saya Slope), a street that runs uphill toward the center of the neighborhood. The name Karadolap means literally "black cabinet" (Turkish: kara + dolap).

== Composition ==
Karadolap has a large number of shanties (gecekondu). The neighborhood was settled "organically" around a hill by refugees and other migrants from Macedonia and later by internal migrants from Eastern Anatolia, especially from Erzurum and Muş. The hilltop now features a public park with a football (soccer) field and an elementary school. The neighborhood is slowly undergoing redevelopment, with gecekondus being replaced by large apartment buildings.

== History ==
The area was first settled in the early 1920s by Albanians from Macedonia. Settlement increased in the 1950s and 60s as Albanians from Yugoslavia joined their compatriots. Karadolap was attractive for newcomers because of public lands that were available for gecekondus and because of factories that were being established nearby along the Golden Horn.

As the state began to see land near the Bosporus and Golden Horn as more suitable for upper-class residence, starting in the mid-1990s and increasing after the 2004 elections, residents were pressured or forced to leave, sometimes with expropriations and demolitions, often with the excuse of "flood risk." Residents often resisted expulsion and were sometimes successful.

== Organizations ==
Organizations based in Karadolap include

- Pir Sultan Abdal Kültür Derneği Eyüp Şubesi (the Eyüp Chapter of the Pir Sultan Abdal Cultural Association), which administers the Alibeyköy Cemevi in Karadolap
- Karadolap Gençlik Spor (Karadolap Youth Sports)
- Çağdaş Erzurum Hınıs Tekman Köy Dernekleri Federasyonu (the Federation of Modern Erzurum Hınıs-Tekman Village Associations)
- Üsküp Brezalılar Derneği (the Association of People from Skopje Brezë)
