= Yıldıztabya =

Neighborhood in Gaziosmanpaşa district, Istanbul, Turkey

Yıldıztabya is a neighborhood in the Gaziosmanpaşa District of Istanbul, Turkey.

Its population is 24,901 (2019).

It is bordered on the north by the Eyüpsultan neighborhoods of Yeşilpınar and Karadolap, on the east by the Eyüpsultan neighborhoods of Esentepe and Sakarya, on the south by the Gaziosmanpaşa neighborhoods of Pazariçi and Karlıtepe, and on the west by the Gaziosmanpaşa neighborhoods of Yenidoğan and Sarıgöl.

== Name ==
Yıldıztabya means literally "star bastion" (Turkish: yıldız + tabya).

== History ==
The neighborhood formed in the 1950s, as a result of intense internal migration from Anatolia to Istanbul, with a large number of gecekondus. Urban renewal began in 2012; Yıldızpark Konutları, one of the first urban renewal projects in Gaziosmanpaşa, was completed in 2015.
