= Kömürcüoda =

Landfill site and power plant in Turkey

Kömürcüoda is a large landfill site on the Asian side of Istanbul. Gas from the landfill is burnt to generate electricity. Climate Trace estimated that in 2022 the site was the second largest landfill greenhouse gas emitter in Turkey after Odayeri on the European side of Istanbul, and emitted 2.8 million tonnes of greenhouse gas.
