= Zal Mahmud Pasha Mosque =

Mosque in Eyüp, Istanbul, Turkey

- Zal Mahmud Paşa Camii
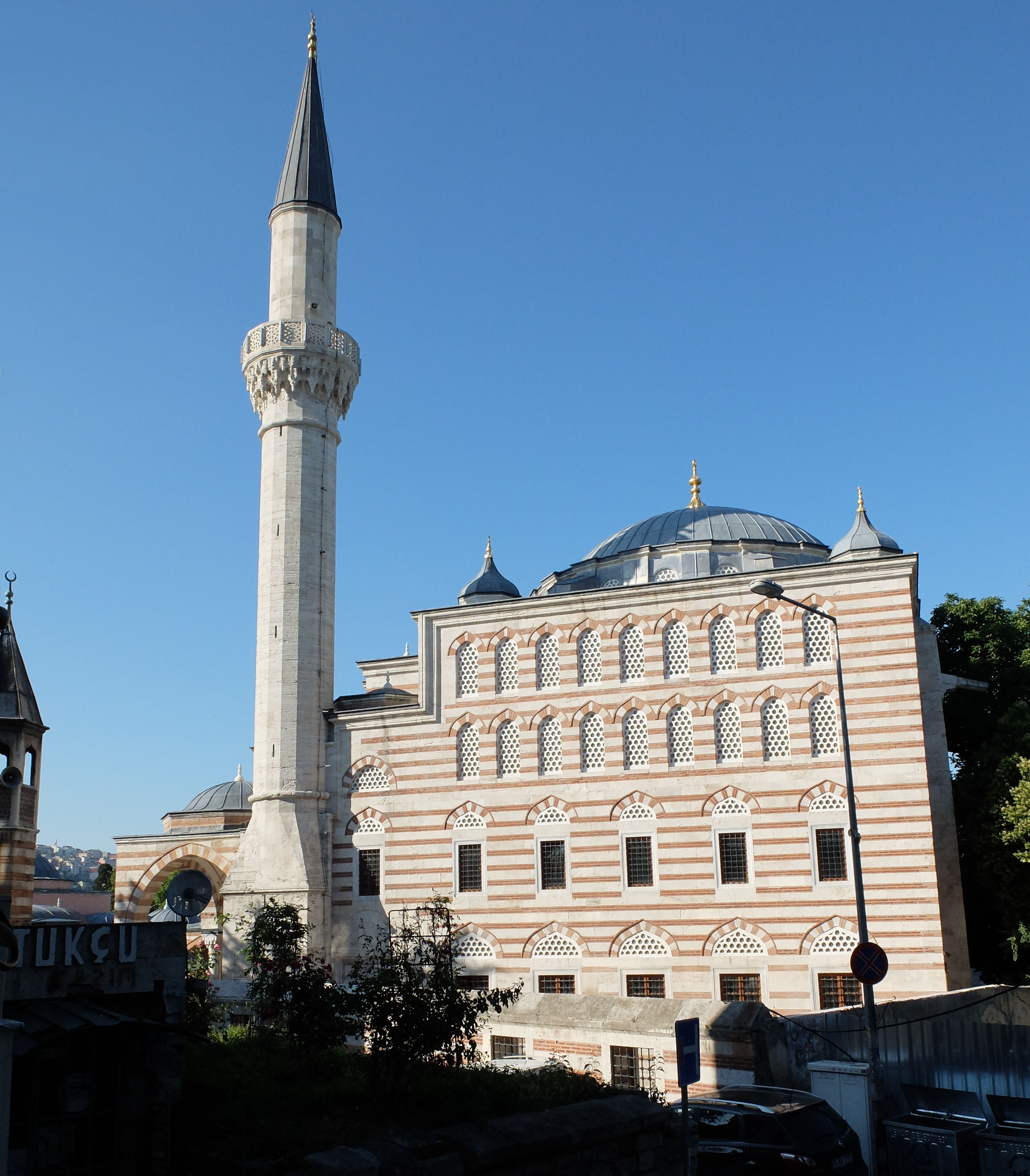
- Zal Mahmud Pasha Mosque

- Location within Istanbul

Religion
- Affiliation: Islam

Location
- Location: Istanbul, Turkey
- Coordinates: 41.044778°N 28.935821°E

Architecture
- Architect: Mimar Sinan
- Type: Mosque
- Style: Ottoman architecture
- Groundbreaking: 1577
- Completed: 1590

Specifications
- Dome dia. (outer): 12.4 m (41 ft)
- Minaret: 1
- Materials: alternating layers of ashlar and brickwork

The Zal Mahmud Pasha Mosque (Turkish: Zal Mahmut Paşa Camii) is a 16th-century Ottoman mosque located in the Eyüp district of Istanbul, Turkey. It was designed by the imperial architect Mimar Sinan and completed in 1590.

== History ==
The building of the mosque was jointly endowed by Şah Sultan and her second husband, the Bosnian born vizier, Zal Mahmud Pasha. Both had died in 1580. Şah was one of the daughters of the sultan Selim II and his wife Nurbanu Sultan. After the death of Şah Sultan's first husband in 1574 she married Zal Mahmud Pasha who in 1553 under Suleiman I's orders had strangled Şehzade Mustafa, a half-brother of Selim II and Suleiman's eldest son.

The mosque was designed by the imperial architect Mimar Sinan. Building work began in 1577 but was not completed until 1590, two years after Sinan's death.

== Architecture ==
The mihrab is surrounded by a border of Iznik tiles.

== Gallery ==
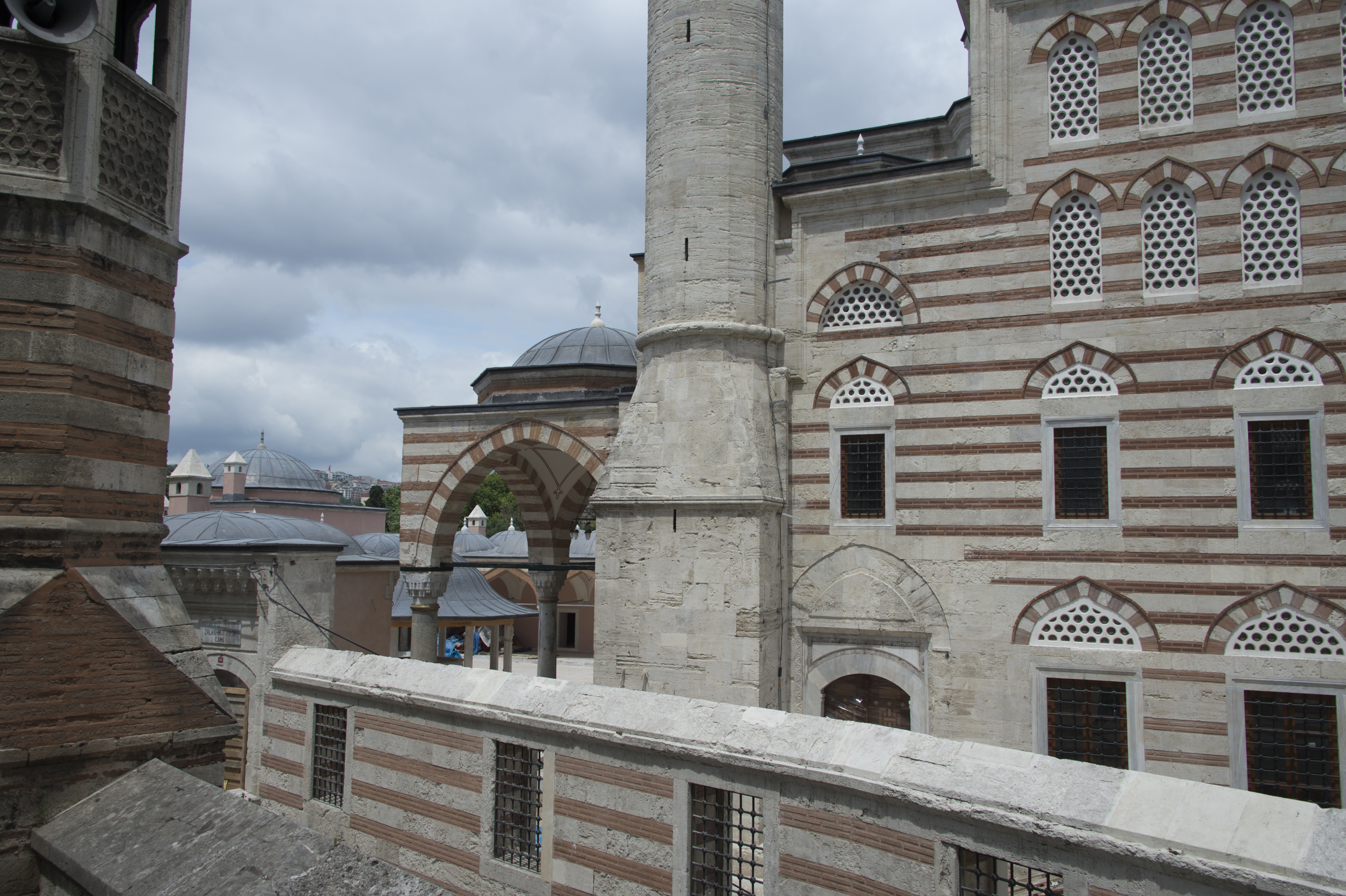
Zal Mahmut Pasha mosque exterior view from Selahi Mehmet Efendi Cami

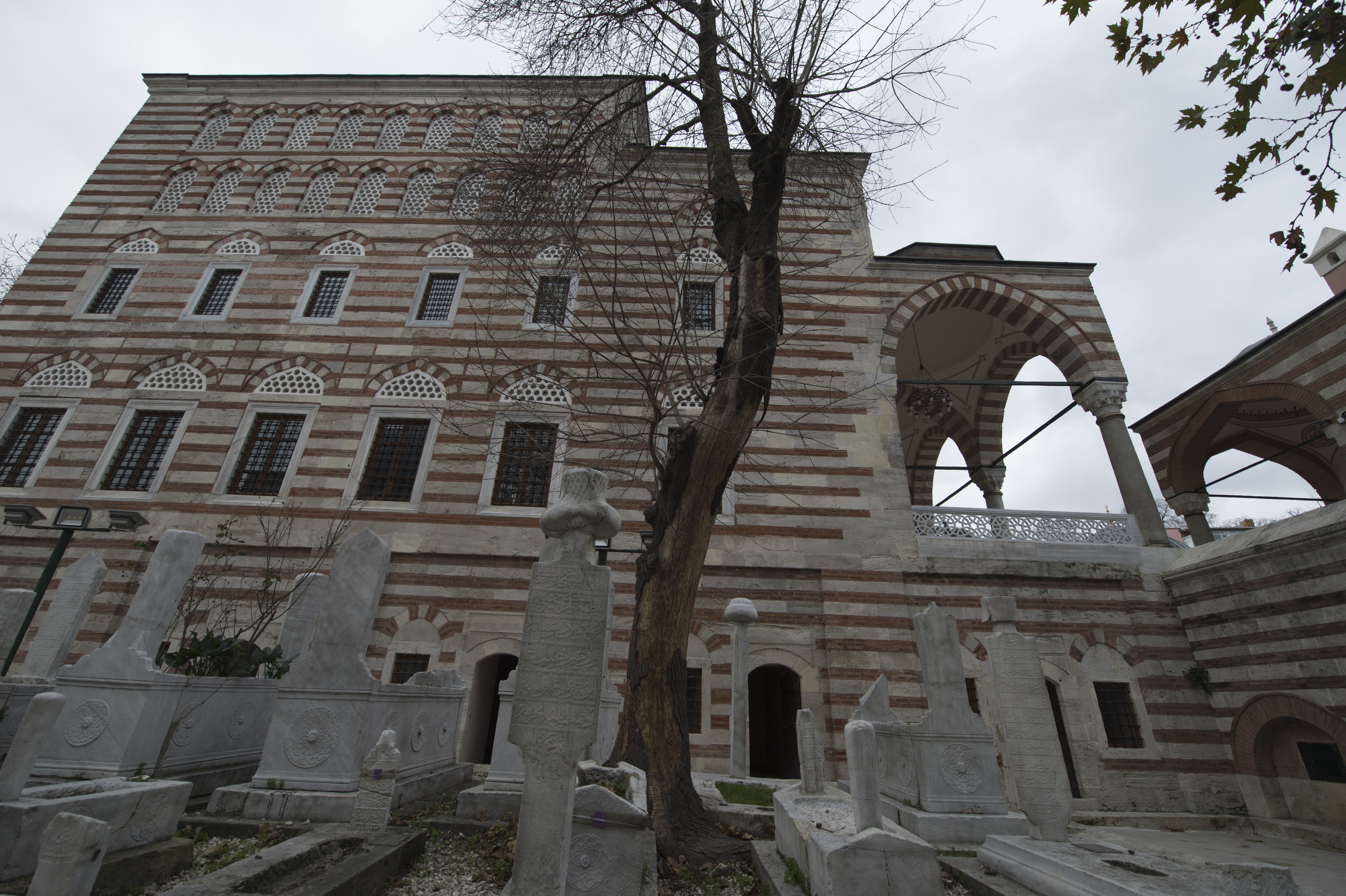
Zal Mahmut Pasha mosque view from garden

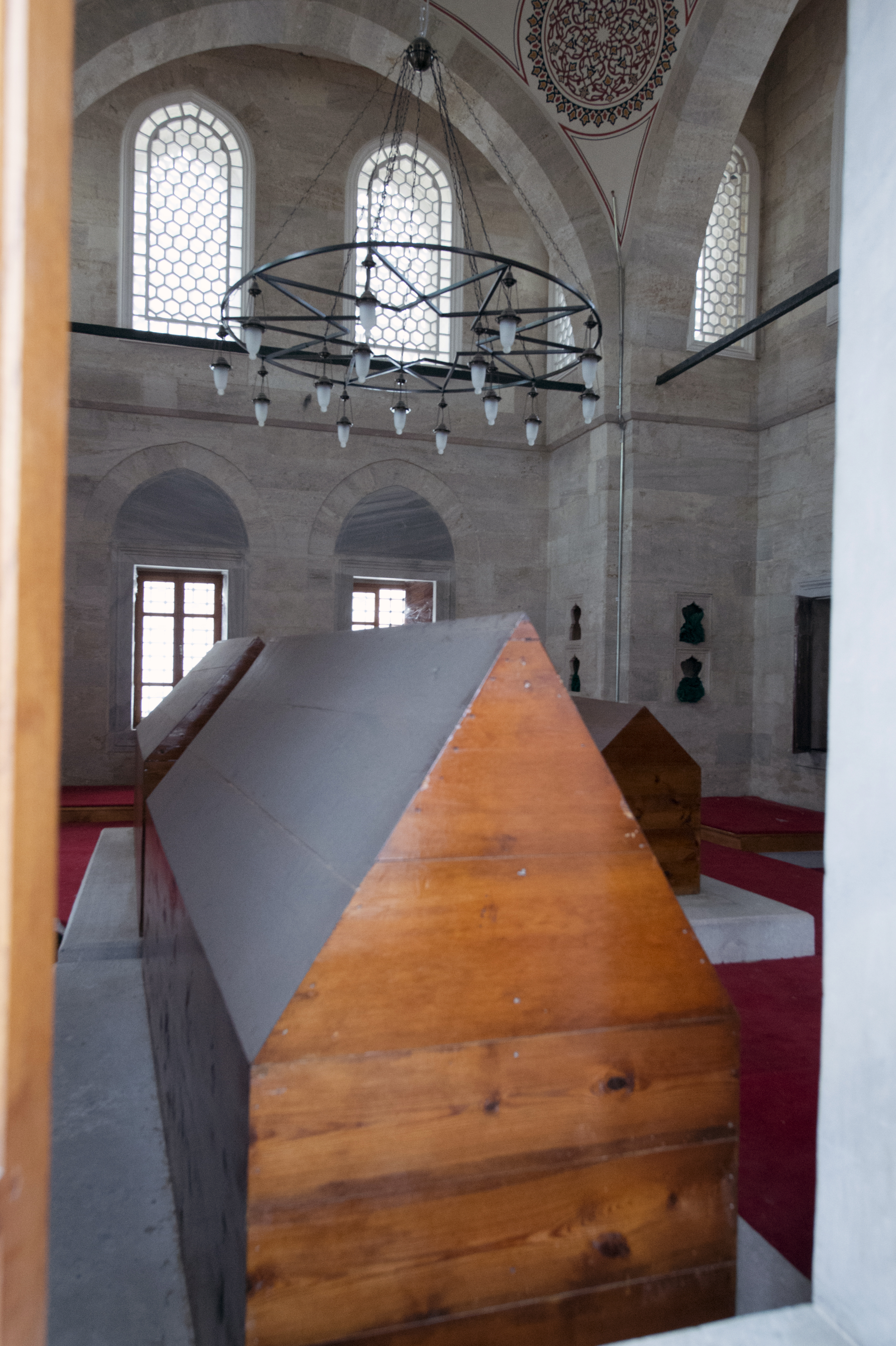
Zal Mahmut Pasha mosque inside türbe

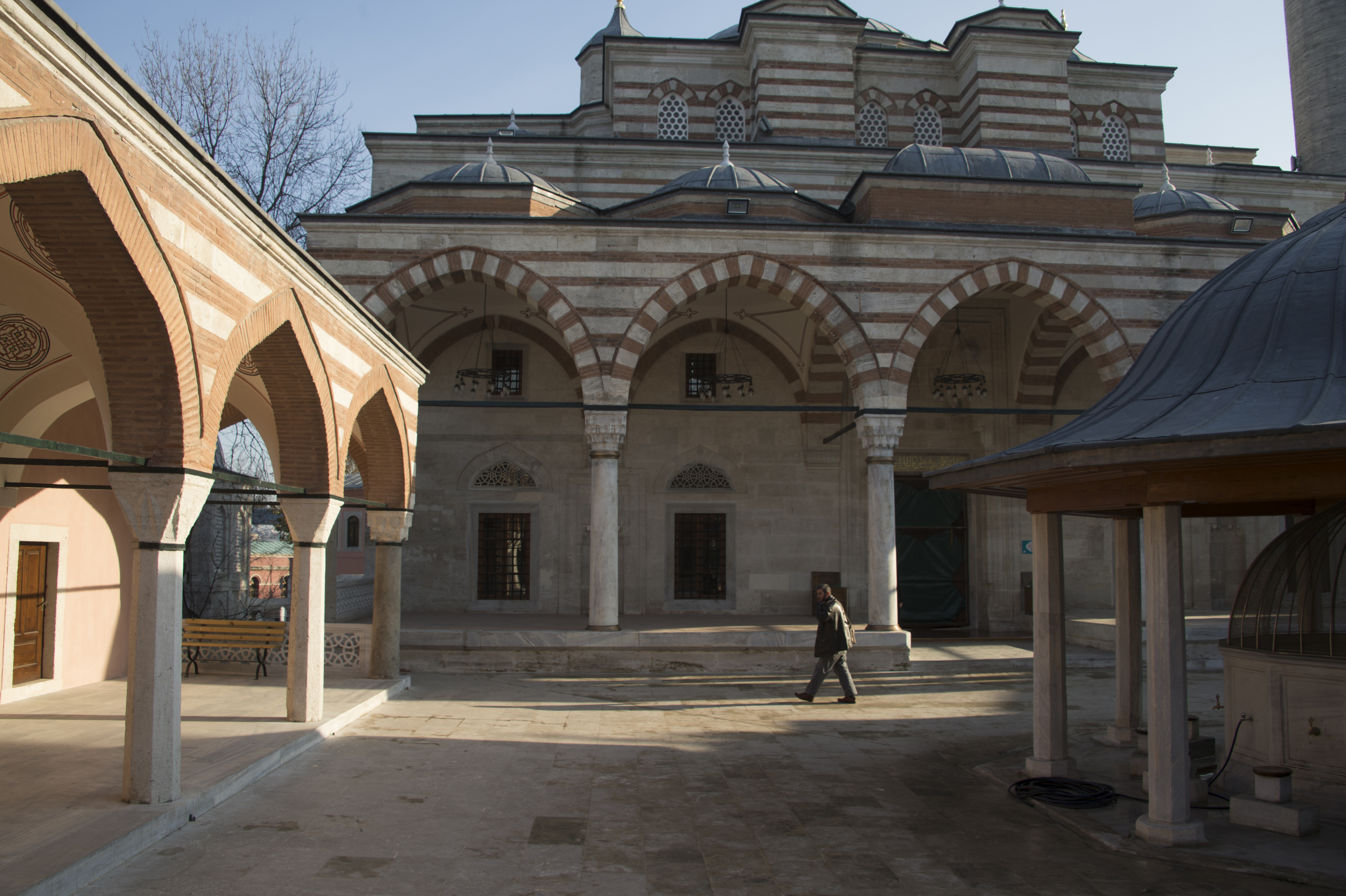
Zal Mahmut Pasha mosque exterior

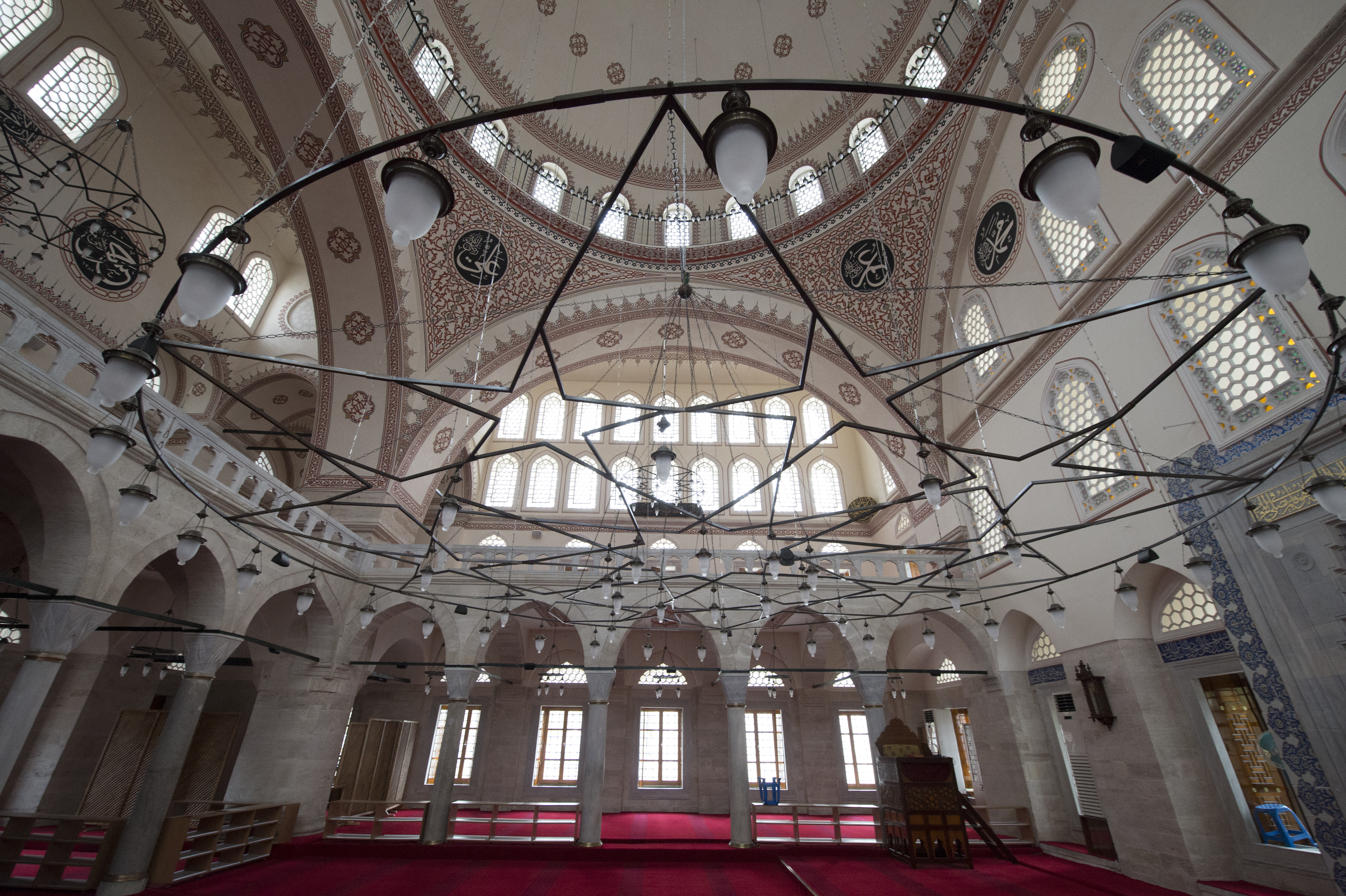
Zal Mahmut Pasha mosque interior south to north

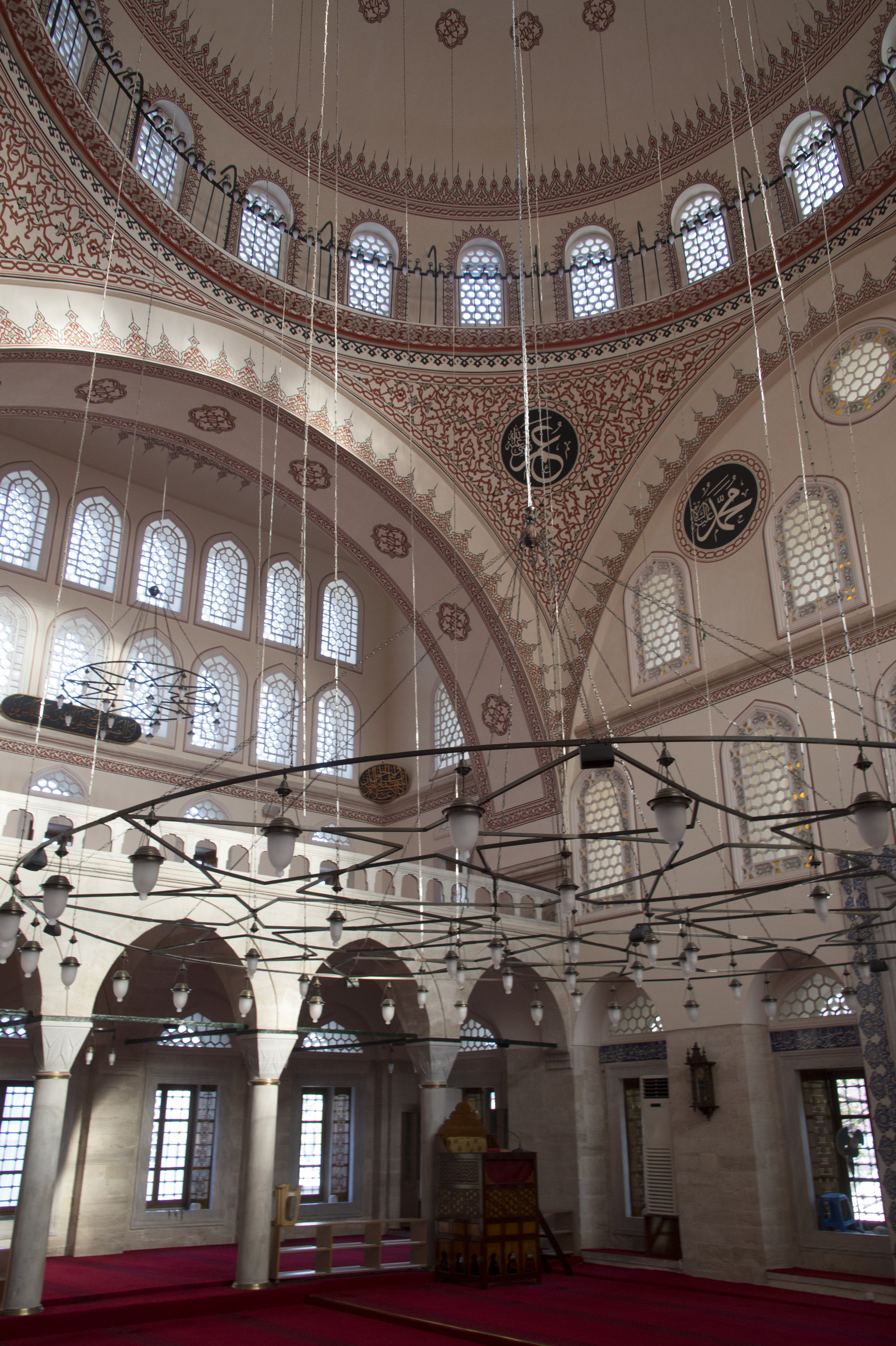
Zal Mahmut Pasha mosque interior

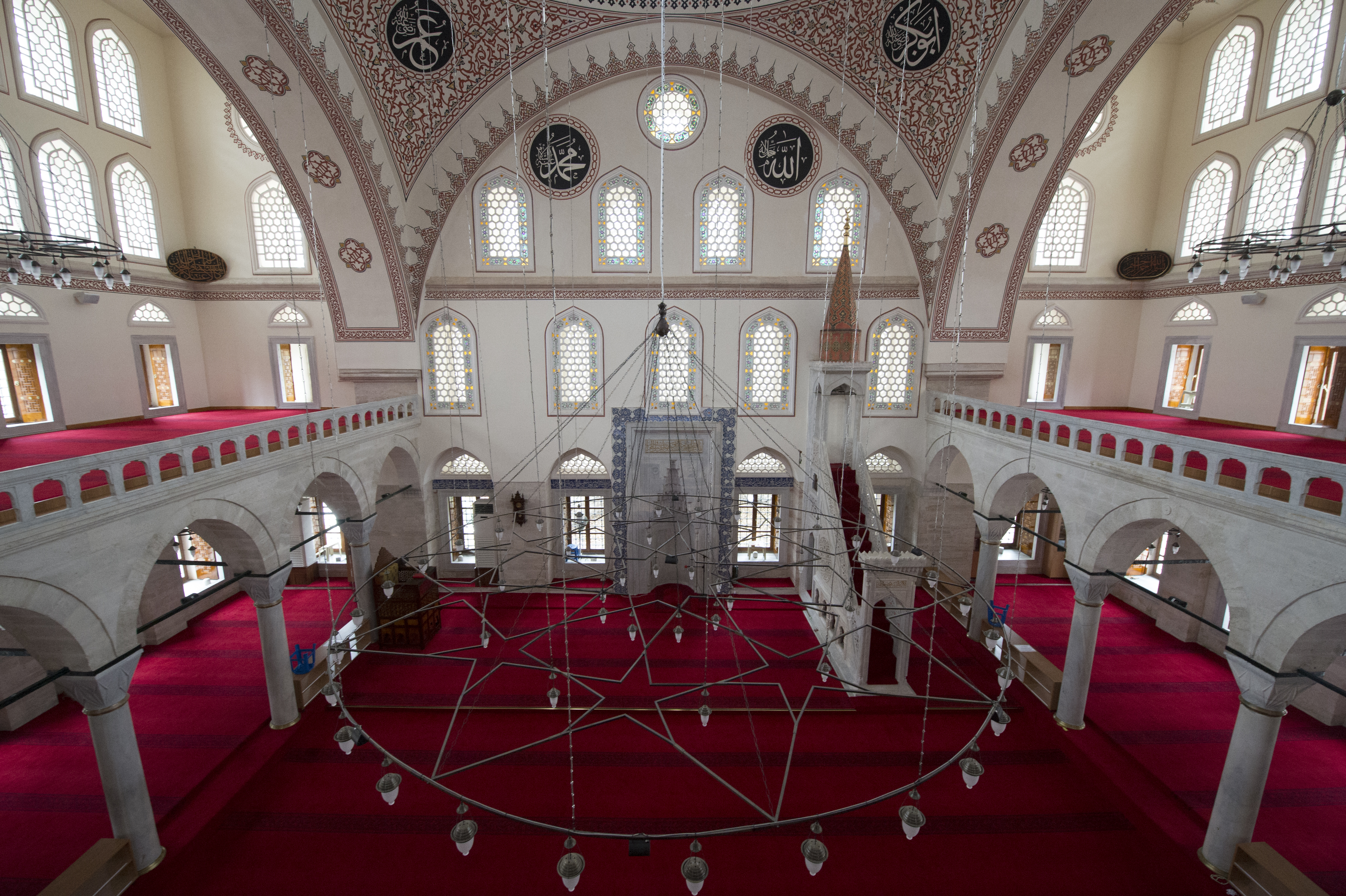
Zal Mahmut Pasha mosque interior view from first floor

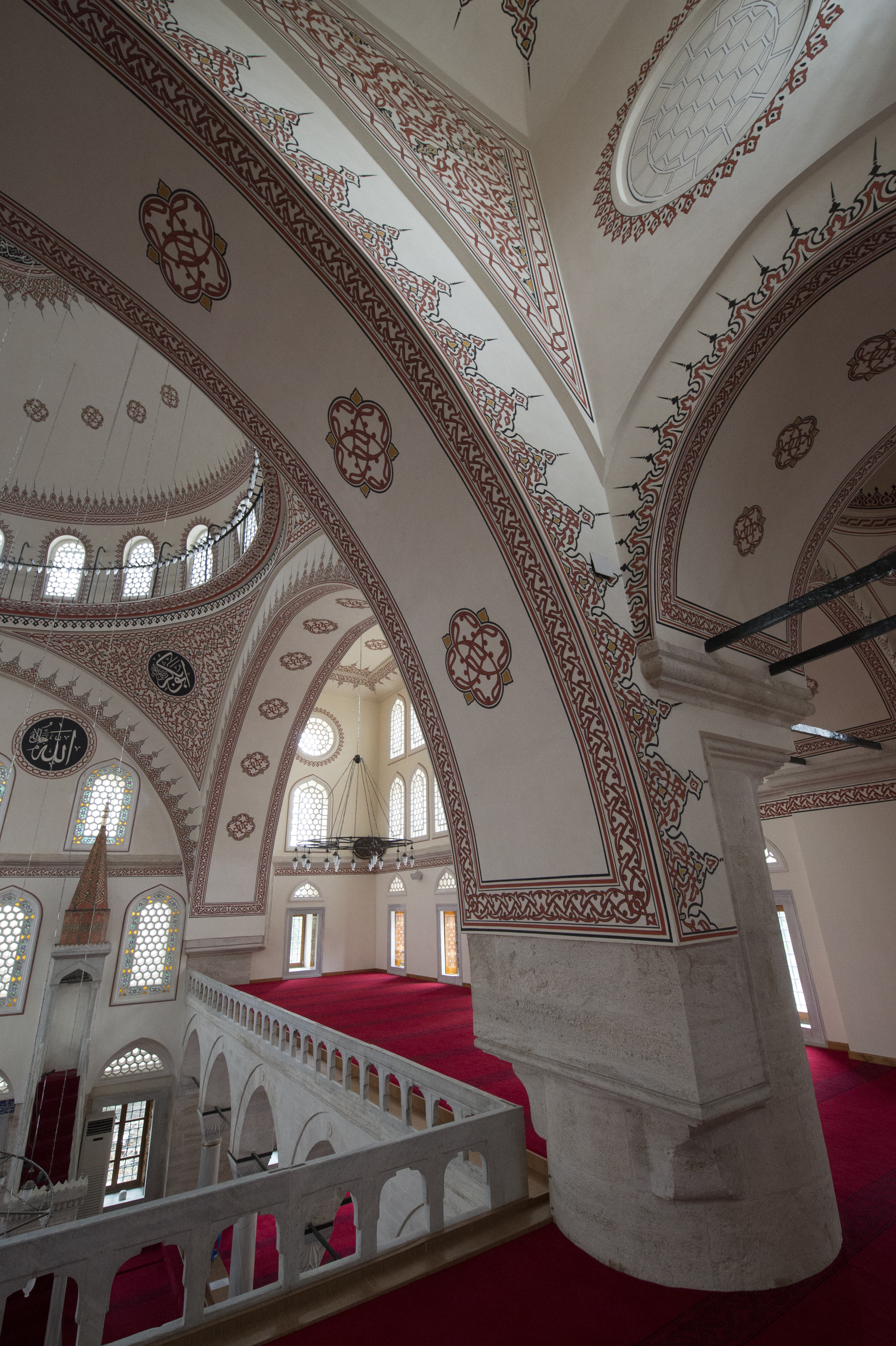
Zal Mahmut Pasha mosque interior view from first floor

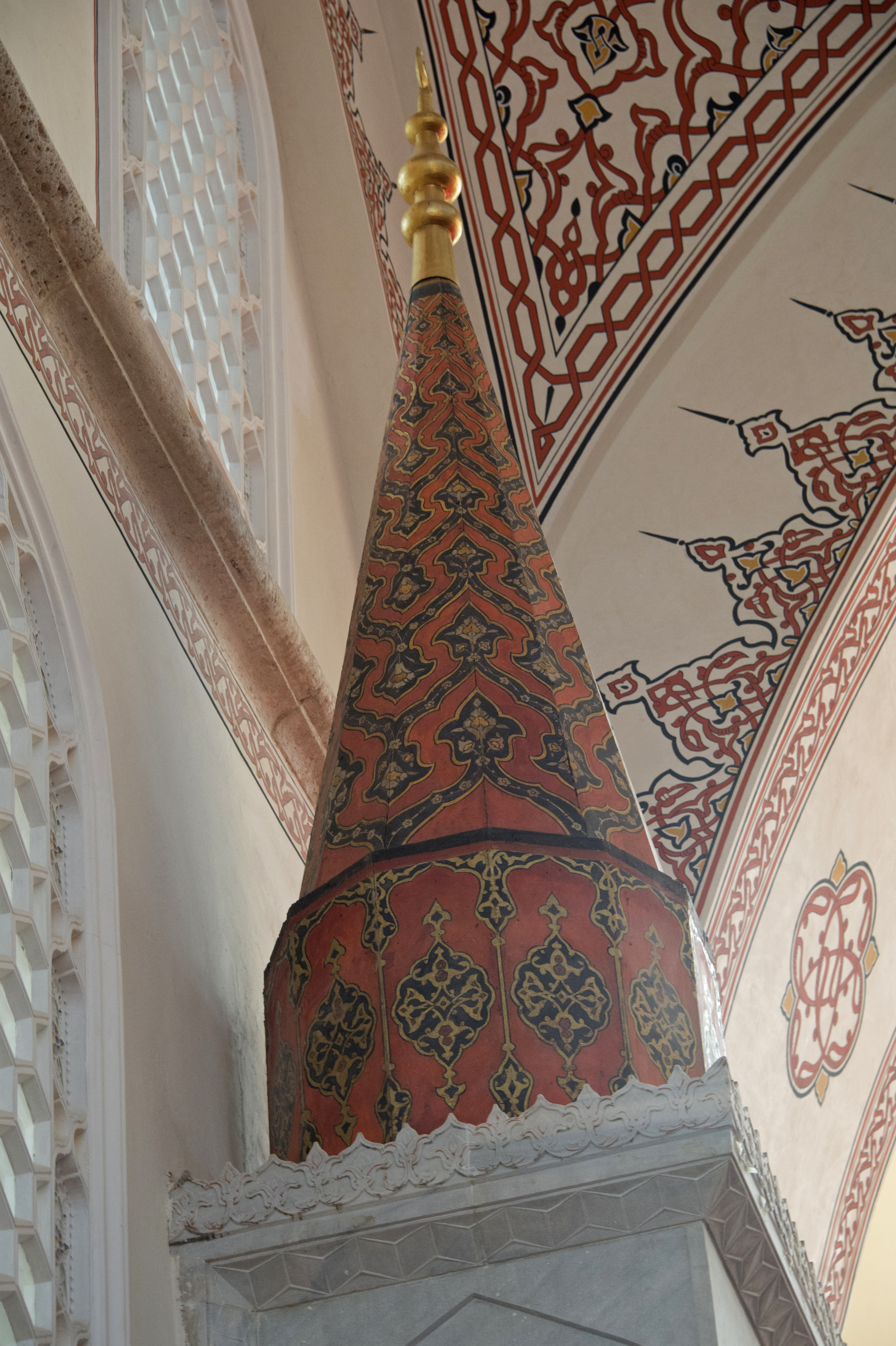
Zal Mahmut Pasha mosque top minber

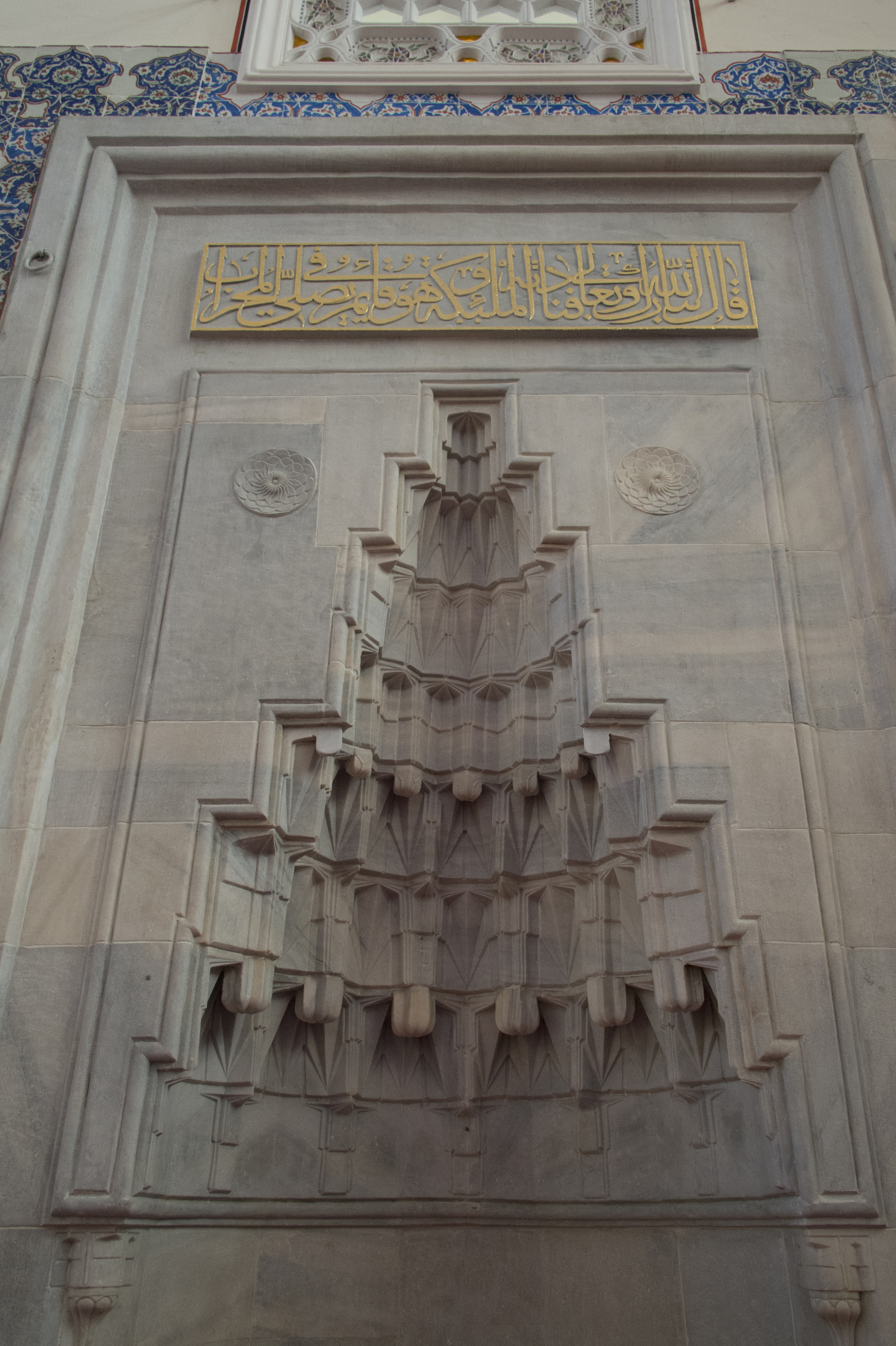
Zal Mahmut Pasha mosque top mihrab

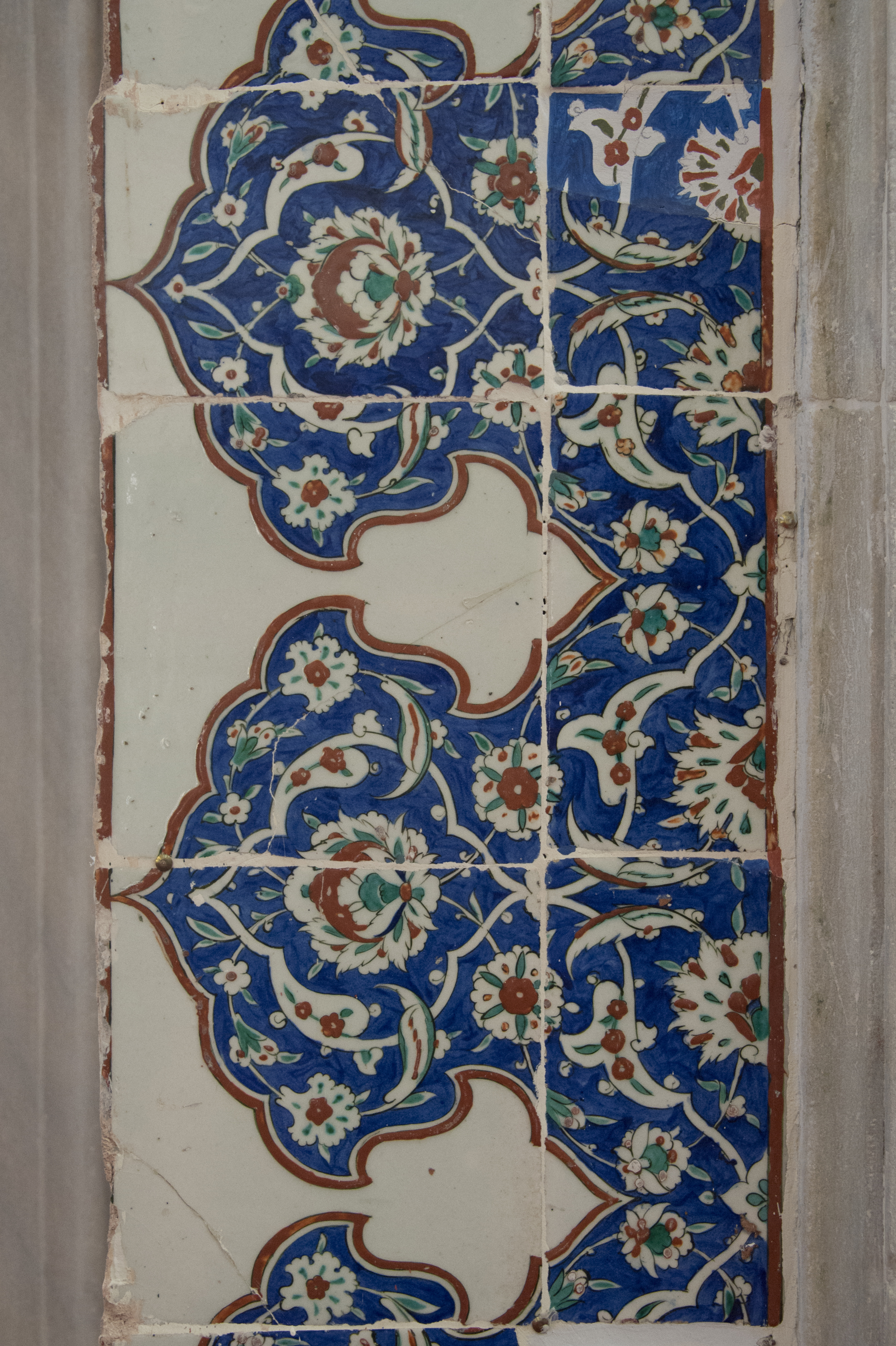
Zal Mahmut Pasha mosque tiles round mihrab

== See also ==
- List of Friday mosques designed by Mimar Sinan

== Sources ==
- Necipoğlu, Gülru (2005). The Age of Sinan: Architectural Culture in the Ottoman Empire. London: Reaktion Books. ISBN 978-1-86189-253-9.
