= Terazidere =

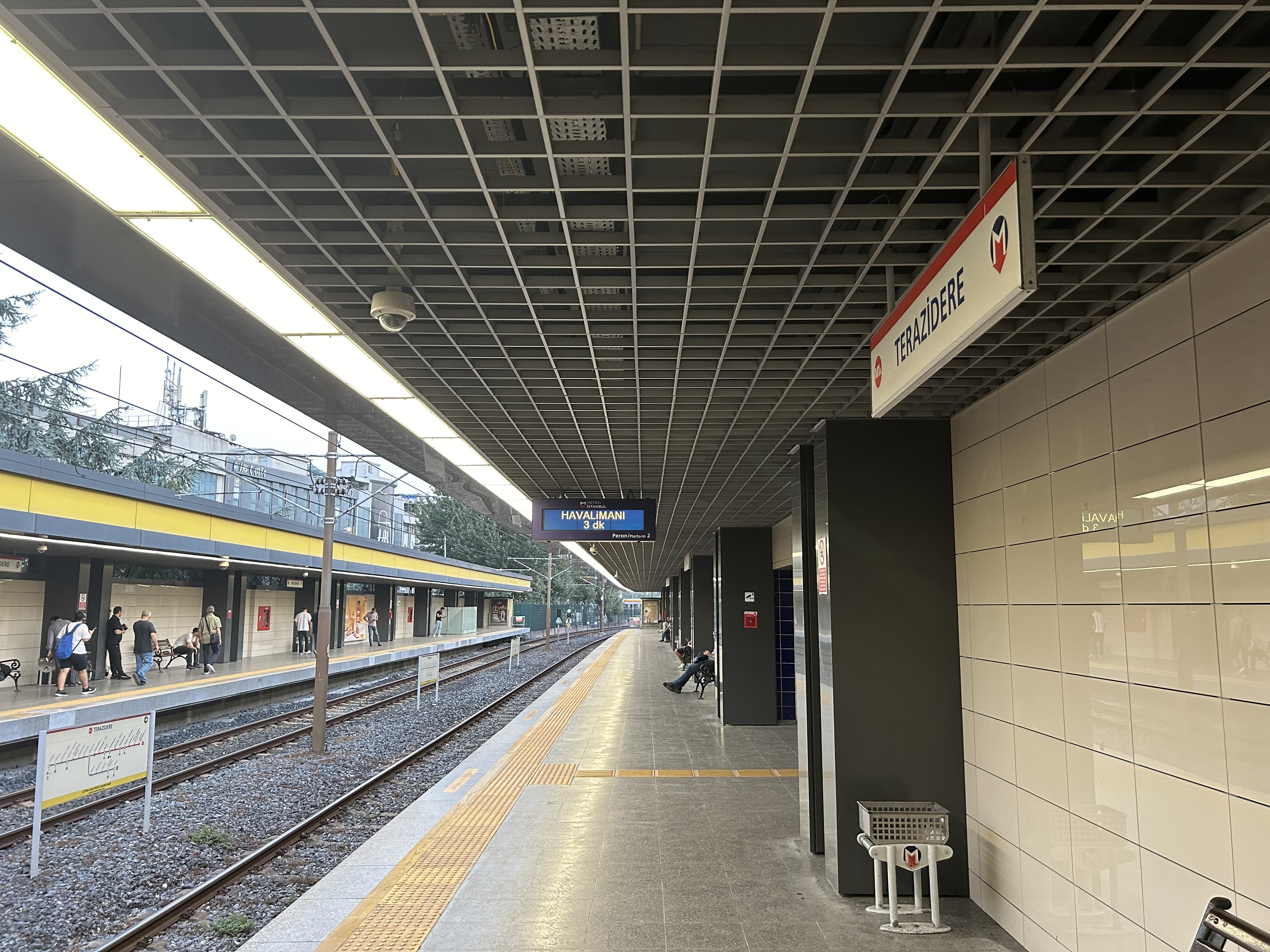
Terazidere Metro Station

Terazidere is a neighborhood (mahalle) in the Bayrampaşa district of Istanbul Province, Turkey. It is on the European side of Istanbul.

It is bordered by the Bayrampaşa neighborhood of Altıntepsi on the north, the Bayrampaşa neighborhoods of Orta and Vatan on the east, the Zeytinburnu neighborhood of Maltepe on the south, and the Esenler neighborhoods of Namık Kemal and Yavuz Selim on the west.

The neighborhood's population is 15,206 (2024).

The neighborhood's name (literally, Turkish: terazi, "scale, balance" + dere, "creek") comes from the creek named Terazidere, now covered over, which flowed from the confluence of Ayvalıdere and Cicöz Creeks to Zeytinburnu and ultimately to the Sea of Marmara.

After 1950, the area began to be settled by immigrants from the Balkans. The numerous factories in the area brought rapid population growth. Because of increased demand for water, a well was opened in Terazidere in 1963. However, insufficient sewage infrastructure led to an outbreak of cholera in 1970. (The source of the outbreak was traced to a stream originating in the village of Habipler to the north of Bayrampaşa.) Terazidere is now one of the main industrial centers of the area.
