= Çırçır, Eyüpsultan =

Neighborhood in Eyüpsultan district, Istanbul, Turkey

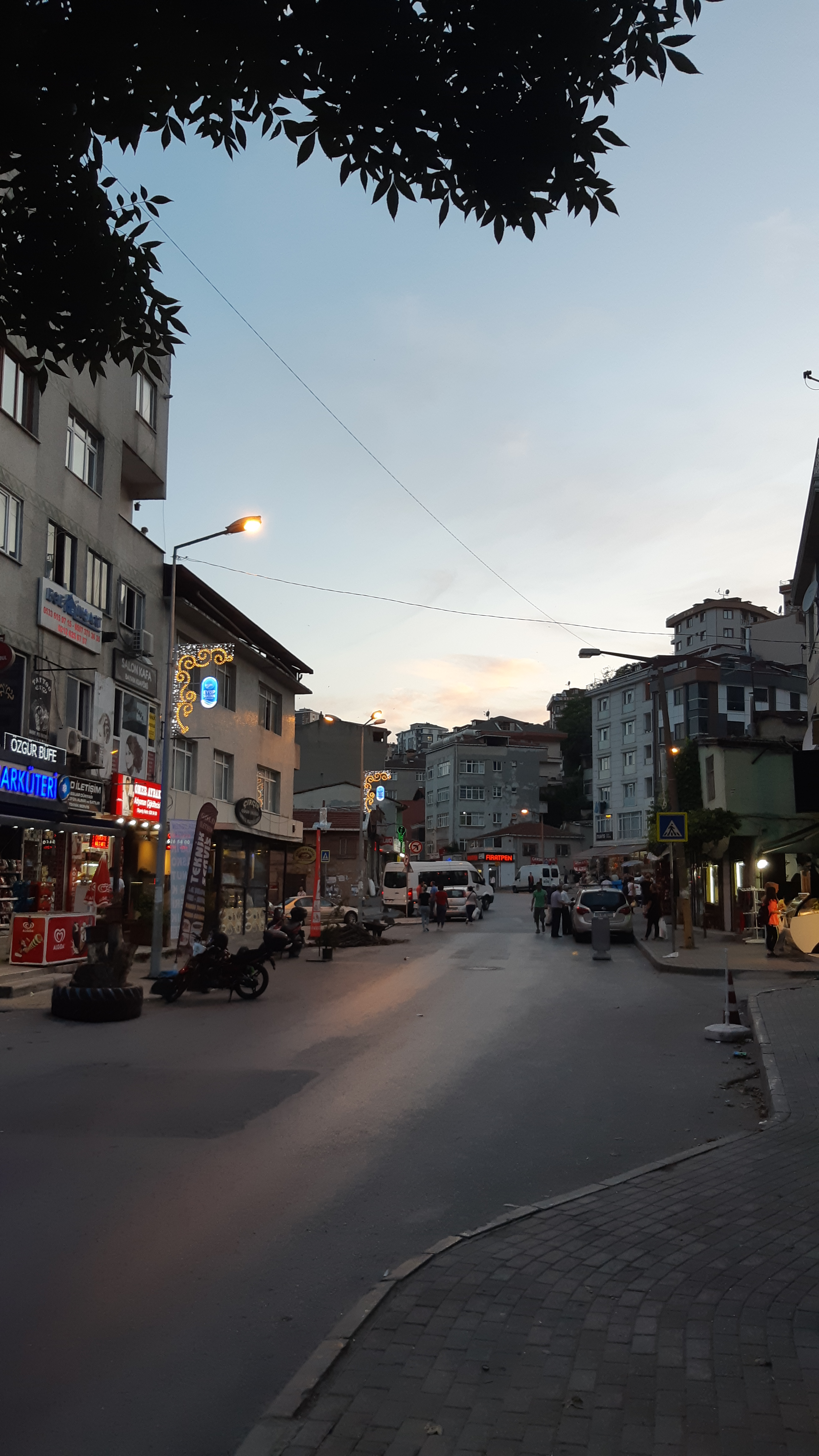
Street photograph of Circir eyupsultan

Çırçır is a neighborhood in the Eyüpsultan District of Istanbul, Turkey.

Its population is 28,537 (2018).

It is bordered on the north by the 5. Levent neighborhood, on the east by the Alibeyköy neighborhood, on the south by the Karadolap neighborhood, and on the west by the Akşemsettin neighborhood.
