= Waste management in Turkey =

Turkey generates about 30 million tons of solid municipal waste per year; the annual amount of waste generated per capita amounts to about 400 kilograms. About 95% of waste is collected.

== Overview ==
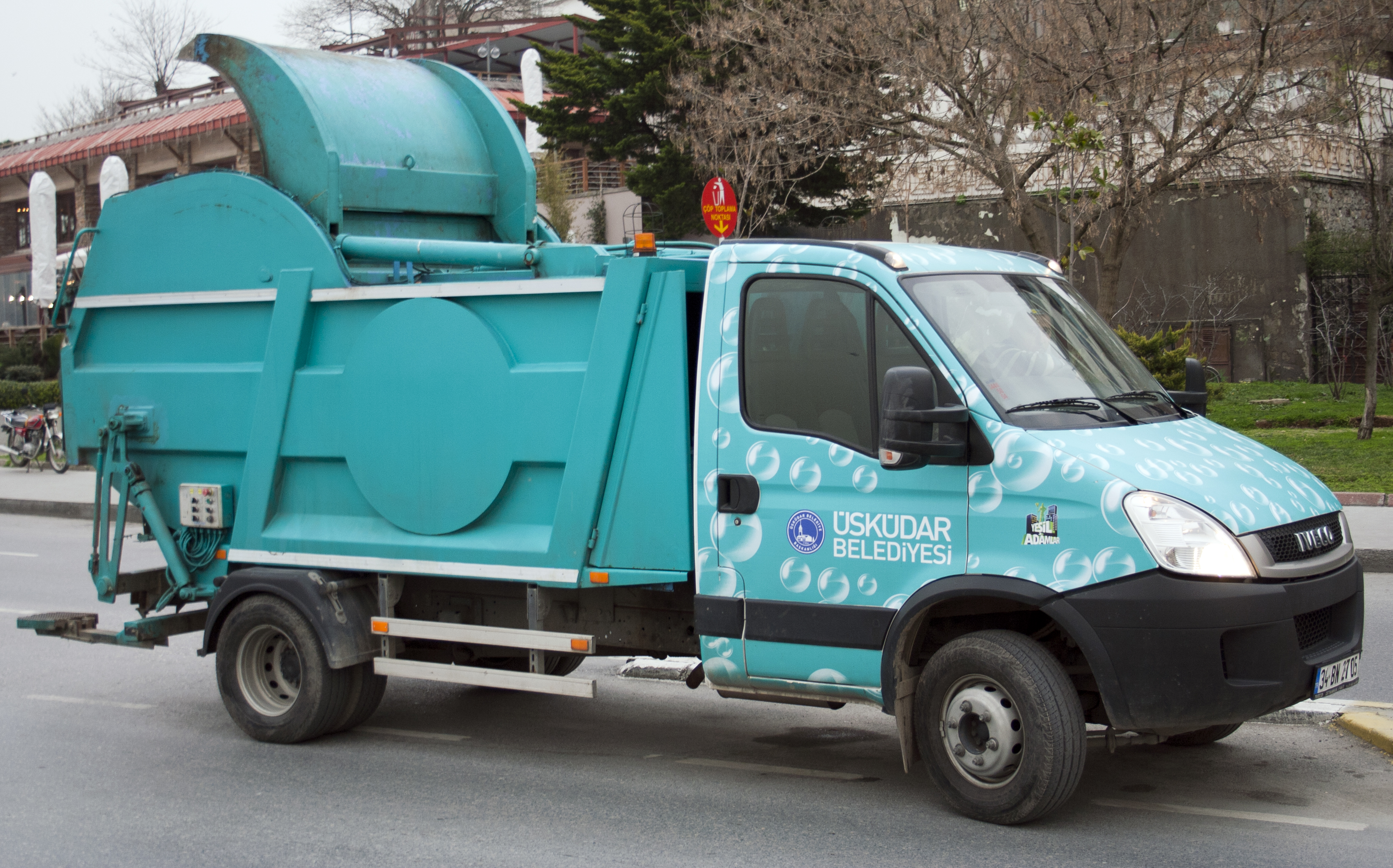
The management of municipal waste is under the responsibility of municipalities as a regional management approach

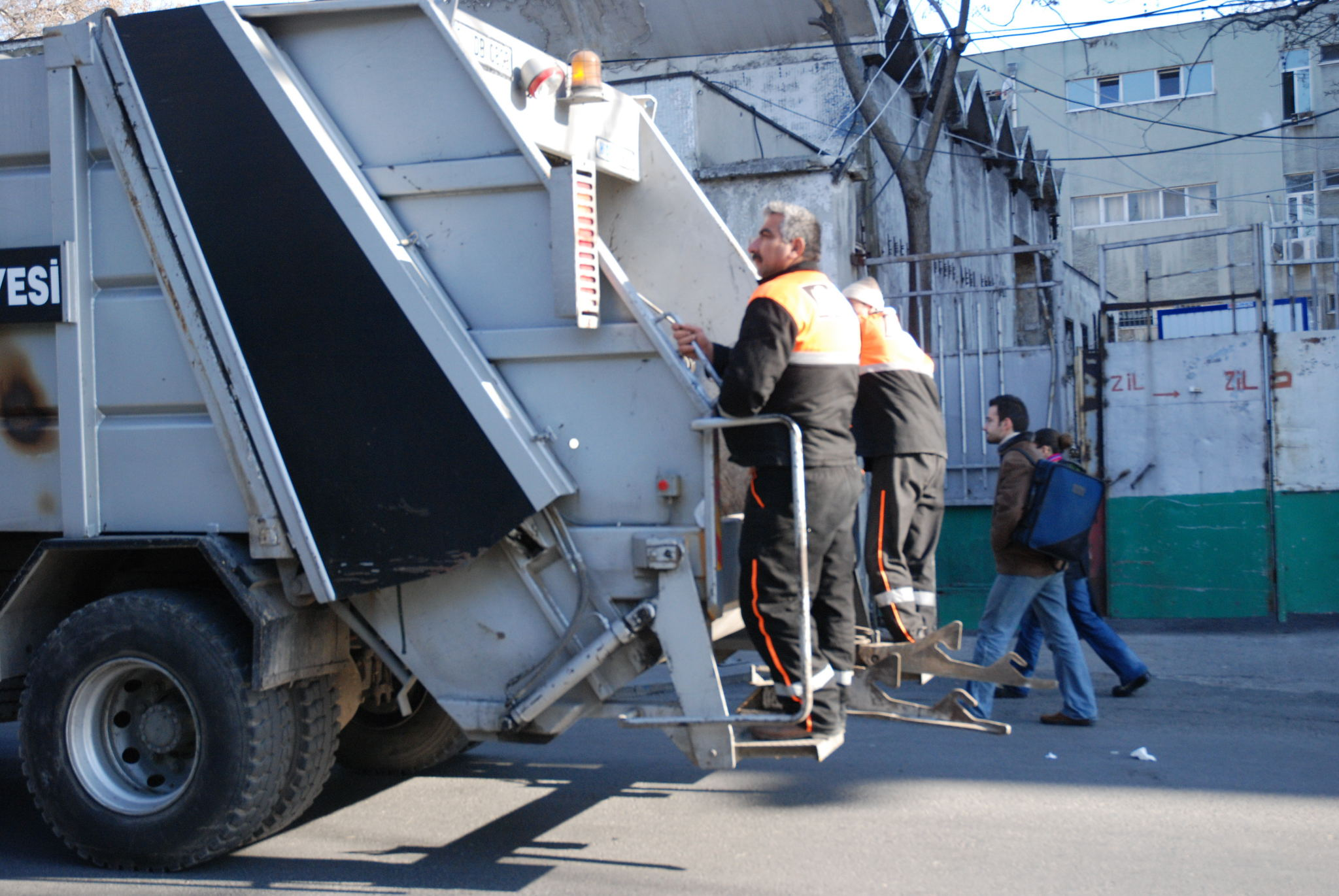
The municipal waste is collected on a regularly scheduled basis

Turkey's waste management system is not a priority policy area. The country regardless employs several waste management practices including sanitary landfills, incineration (only for hazardous waste), sterilization, composting, and other advanced disposal methods such as pyrolysis, gasification as well as plasma. The most common method of waste disposal in the country, especially for municipal waste, is landfilling. The municipal waste is collected on a regularly scheduled basis. The metropolitan municipality and other municipalities are responsible for providing collection, transportation, separation, recycling, disposal and storage of waste services.

Turkey uses a diffuse approach to manage waste by distributing duties and powers among many institutions and organizations. In the early 2020s large quantities of foreign plastic waste was imported.

=== Legal framework ===
Waste management in Turkey is subject to numerous environmental laws. The country had only three laws concerning waste between 1983-2003, whereas ten more regulations were introduced between 2003-2008. Most environmental regulations in Turkey are based on Article 56 of the Constitution, which states:

It is the duty of the State and citizens to improve the natural environment, to protect the environmental health and to prevent environmental pollution.

— Article 56

Turkish Law on Environment no.2872 creates the basis of the legal framework for waste management practices in Turkey:

It is prohibited to discharge all sorts of waste and residue directly or indirectly into receiving environment, storing them or being engaged in a similar activity.

— Article 8

In addition, Law on Amendments in Law on Environment no.5491 (Article 11); Law on Metropolitan Municipalities no.5216 (Article 7); and Municipal Law no.5393 (Article 14 and 15) explain the duties of municipal authorities, whereas Law on Municipal Revenues no. 2464 (Article 97) establishes the polluter-pays principle. Finally, Articles 181 and 182 of the Turkish Penal Code no.5237 (under the section "Crimes Against the Environment") state that intentional pollution of the environment is punishable by law up to five years in prison. The degree of the punishment is decided upon the severity of the pollution and impact on the environment.

=== Government efforts ===
According to the Turkish Ministry of Environment and Urbanization, the management of municipal waste is under the responsibility of municipalities as a regional management approach by the Ministry of Environment and Urbanization. Since 2003, municipalities are implementing municipal waste management projects by cooperating with other municipalities in the region (through the municipalities union). Turkish government drew up a master plan for 2007- 2009 based on the recognition that uncontrolled and unsafe waste disposal is an integral part of daily life in Turkey and poses a serious risk to the environment and to the health of the country's 70 million inhabitants. The number of controlled landfill sites was raised to roughly 3000 - a steep increase on the 90 that existed in the 1990s. As of 2011, there is approximately one sanitary landfill site per municipality.

Ongoing initiatives towards improving the municipal solid waste management in Turkey aimed to set up a waste management system acting in accordance with the related national legislation and EU legislation, covering the establishment of necessary waste treatment facilities (pretreatment facilities and landfills) and transfer stations, reduction of the amount of waste, ensuring recycling and reuse, and reducing the waste transportation costs.

There is a deposit-refund system for drinks containers.

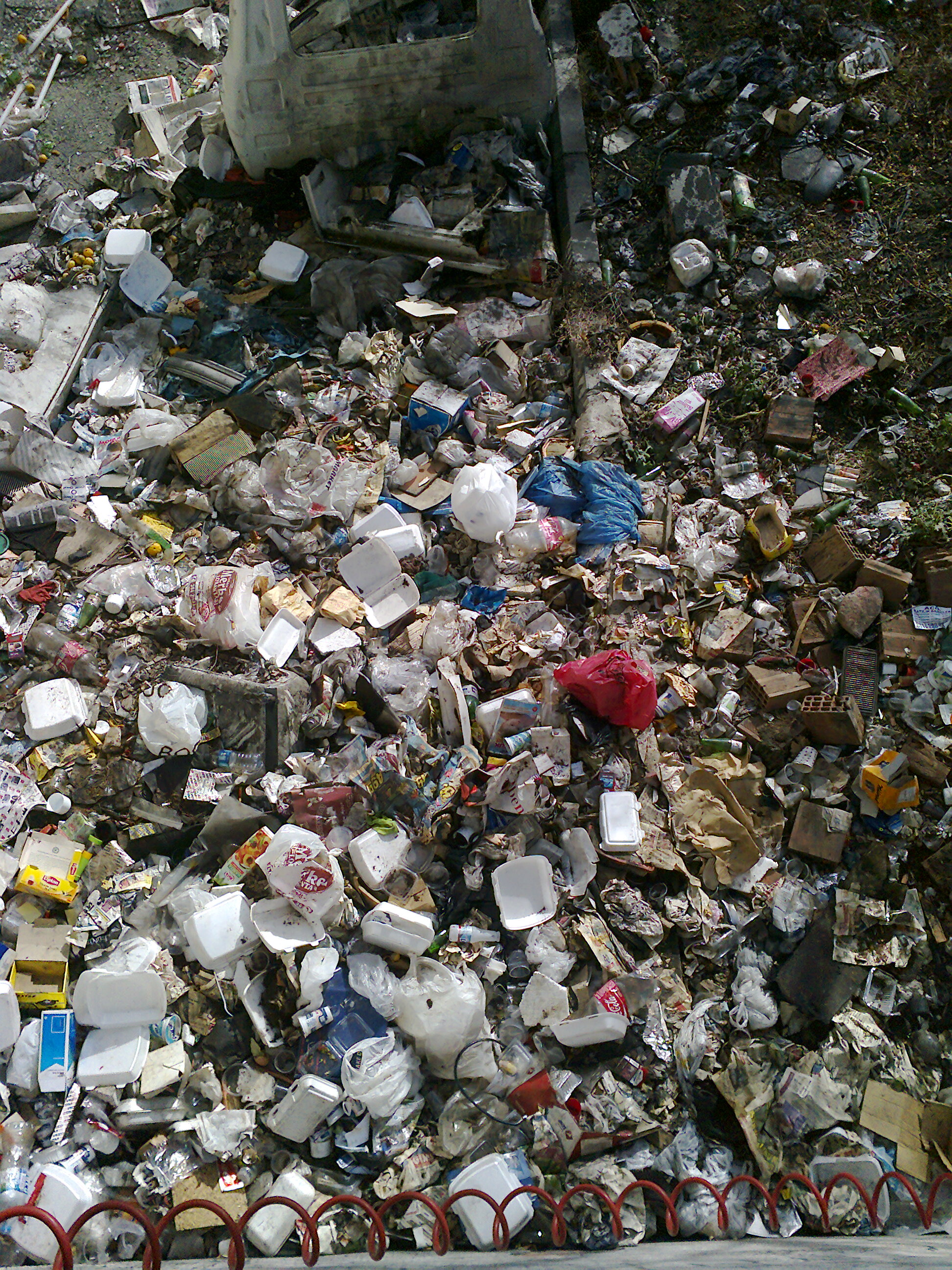
Uncovered landfills are potential sources of flammable biogases, carcinogen and toxic waste, as well as microbial diseases

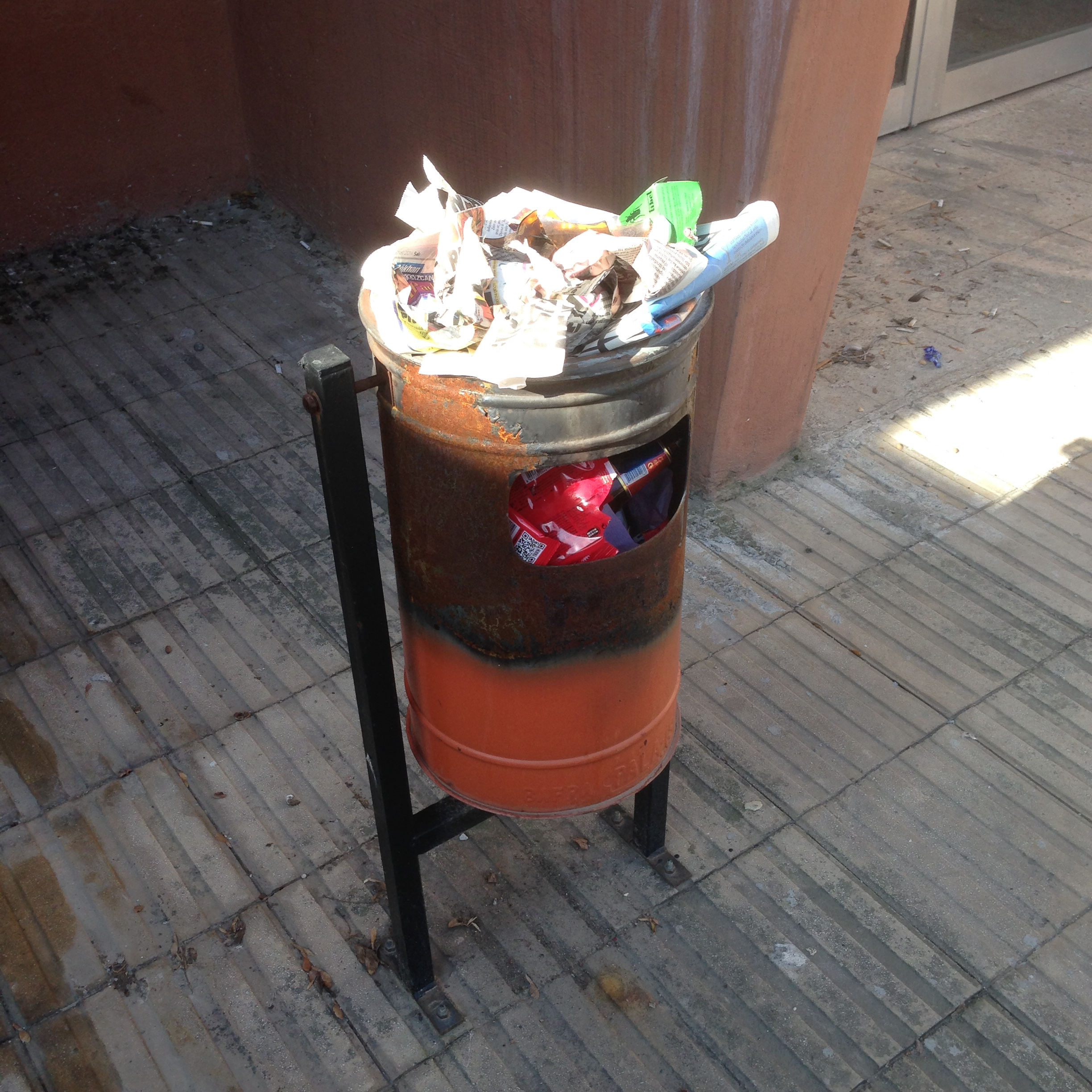
Lack of public and sectoral environmental consciousness is a problem in Turkey

== Waste mismanagement practices ==
The main question in the field of waste management is not the legal arrangement itself; but the deficiencies in implementing them. While Turkey uses a diffuse approach to manage its waste, the effectiveness of application process has been negatively affected due to repetitions and gaps in sharing roles and responsibilities among different agencies. This situation, coupled with insufficient institutional capacity and weak technical infrastructure, limits the ability of related legislation to direct the implementation. Turkey is also yet to develop a comprehensive and specific national strategic plan on waste management.

Eurostat data indicates that Turkey did not recycle any of its municipal solid waste between 2001-2010, although poor reporting, not performance, was given as the cause for the absence of data. The Turkish Ministry of Environment and Urbanization reports the total amount of recycled packaging waste in 2009 to be 2.5 million tonnes, and certainly part of this recycled packaging waste is from MSW sources, but the share is unknown. Out of the approximate 30 million tonnes of municipal waste generated in 2010, 25 million tonnes or 84% were collected and about 98% of this collected waste was landfilled either in sanitary landfills (54%) or dumpsites (44%).

As of 2013, Turkey imposes no landfill tax. According to The Turkish Ministry of Environment and Urbanization, EU Landfill Directive (99/31/EC) will be carried out by 2025.

=== Impact of poor waste management ===
The biggest problem in terms of waste management in the country stems from uncovered landfills, where the garbage is simply left to rot. Turkey's waste financing system does not take into consideration the polluter-pays principle sufficiently, so economical tools are weak to deter pollution and financial sources are inadequate for investments. Usage of natural areas (forests, seasides etc.) still causes a great threat to the environment. In addition, insufficient capacity for treatment and disposal of hazardous waste leads to illegal dumping to the nature. Furthermore, recycling rates are poor due to the lack of adequate facilities and incentives in the waste sector. Uncovered landfills remain to be potential sources of flammable biogases, carcinogen and toxic waste, as well as microbial diseases due to the inadequate changes on their status since 1990s. Along with poor funding and reporting, recycling sector in Turkey also suffers from poor environmental consciousness on both public and industrial level.

Municipalities collect about 1 kg of waste per person per day. The government says the waste sector contributed 15 Mt (3%) of Turkey's 2024 GHG, with almost half of that from the tenth of waste sent to unmanaged landfills. However Climate Trace estimates CO2e from solid waste disposal at 68 Mt in 2025. Senem Abak at Boğaziçi University has suggested possible reasons for this large discrepancy; perhaps the differences in methodology, or official figures could be missing some open burning. Turkey says that as of 2026 its Zero Waste Project has avoided about 180 Mt of emissions, in part avoiding methane emissions by separate collection, composting and anaerobic digestion.

Satellite methane measurements in 2025 and 2026 highlight landfill sites serving Istanbul (such as one in Seymen, Silivri) and Izmir as large emitters. Completely phasing out the little remaining open dumping is important, and in 2026 an academic claimed that MSW could become a carbon sink by 2035 by recovering materials and energy.

Landfilling is the most common waste-disposal method. Climate Trace estimate Odayeri (even though it has a biogas facility) on the European side of Istanbul to have been by far the biggest single emitter of methane from waste in 2025 with 3.6 Mt CO2e. Organic waste sent to landfills emits methane, but the country is working to improve its waste and resource management. One third of organic waste is composted, but others argue for incineration. Some refrigerants are sent to Turkey from other countries for destruction.

== See also ==
- Environmental issues in Turkey
