= Gaziosmanpaşa =

- District and municipality
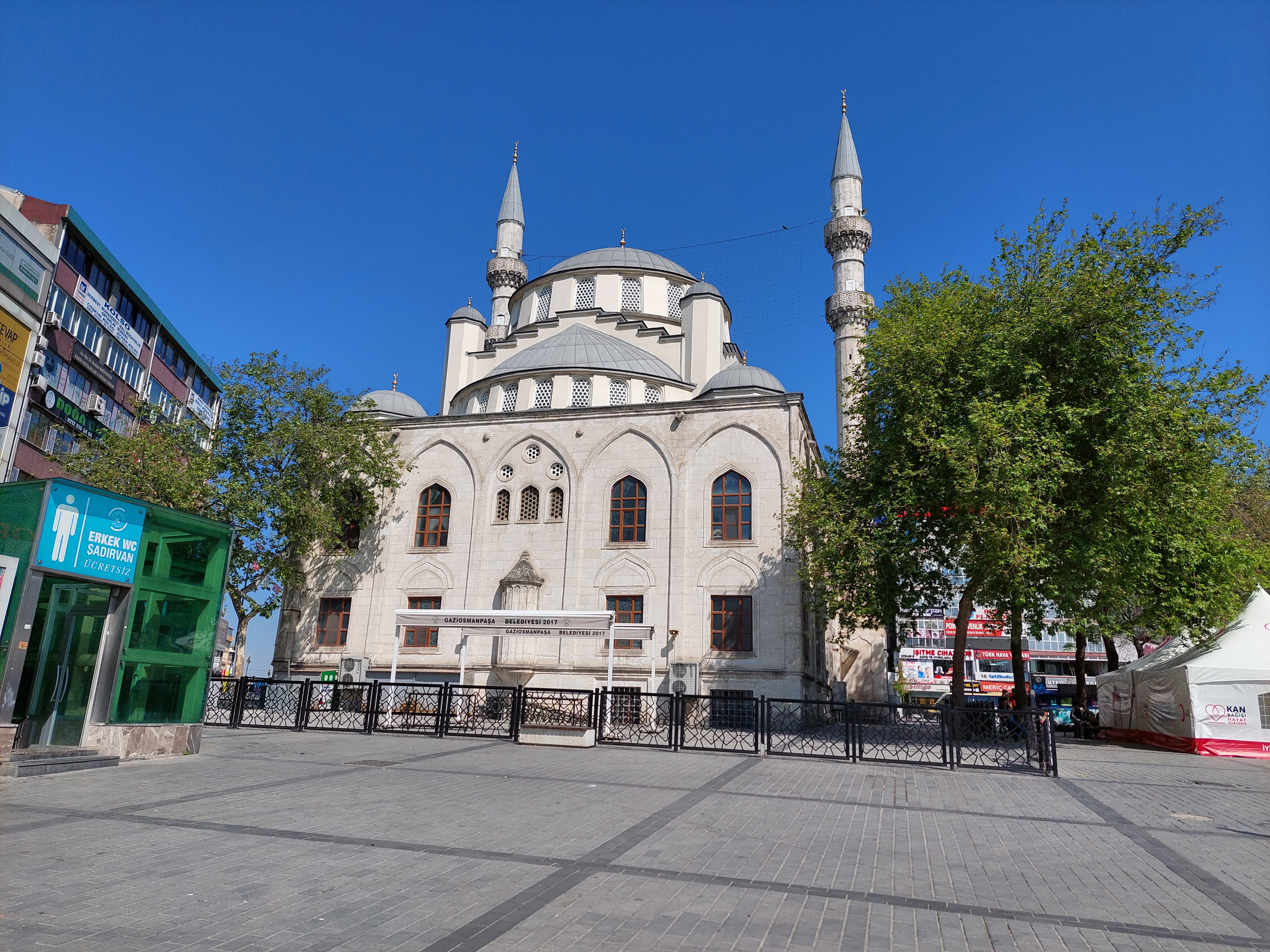
- Gaziosmanpaşa Republic Square

- Logo

- Map showing Gaziosmanpaşa District in Istanbul Province

- Location within Turkey Location within Istanbul
- Coordinates: 41°2′57″N 28°54′05″E
- Country: Turkey
- Province: Istanbul

Government
  - Mayor: Hakan Bahçetepe (CHP)
- Area: 12 km^{2} (4.6 sq mi)
- Population (2022): 495,998
  - Density: 41,000/km^{2} (110,000/sq mi)
- Time zone: UTC+3 (TRT)
- Postal code: 34275
- Area code: 0212
- Website: www.gaziosmanpasa.bel.tr

Gaziosmanpaşa (Turkish: [ɡaːziosˈmanpaʃa]; old name: Taşlıtarla) is a municipality (belediye) and district of Istanbul, Turkey, on its European side. Its area is 12 km^{2}, and its population is 495,998 (2022). Esenler and Bayrampaşa are west, Sultangazi is north and Eyüp is south and east of the district.

== History ==
The district is named after Gazi Osman Pasha (1832–1900), the Ottoman general known as the Hero of Plevna; the name was chosen at the request of the inhabitants when the district was formed in 1963. Until the 1950s the land, then part of Eyüp district, was almost empty. (Note: Accounts of the earlier administrative attachment differ. The municipality's history states that Taşlıtarla was a neighbourhood of Küçükköy until 1958; the district education directorate states that the settlement, then called Göktepe, belonged to the Rami sub-district of Eyüp until 1958.) Its barren, stony ground gave it the popular name Taşlıtarla ("stony field"), and before 1950 it held little more than sheepfolds and a few small workshops.

Settlement began in the early 1950s, when the government of Adnan Menderes granted state land and built houses for Balkan immigrants from Bulgaria, Yugoslavia, Greece and Romania. As industry expanded in nearby Rami and Eyüp, migrants from Anatolia settled on nearby state-owned land, mostly in illegally built gecekondu dwellings, and Taşlıtarla grew into the second-largest gecekondu quarter of Istanbul after Zeytinburnu. A 1962 survey estimated that about 90,000 people lived there in some 18,000 gecekondus. In 1963 the area was separated from Eyüp and joined with parts of Çatalca to form the new district.

With continued migration the population rose rapidly, passing one million by 2007, when Gaziosmanpaşa was the most populous district in Turkey. In 2008, under Law No. 5747, the district was divided in three: the new districts of Sultangazi and Arnavutköy separated in 2009, leaving Gaziosmanpaşa with about 460,000 inhabitants.

== Composition ==
There are 16 neighbourhoods in Gaziosmanpaşa District:

- Bağlarbaşı
- Barbaros Hayrettin Paşa
- Fevzi Çakmak
- Hürriyet
- Karadeniz
- Karayolları
- Karlıtepe
- Kazım Karabekir
- Merkez
- Mevlana
- Pazariçi
- Sarıgöl
- Şemsipaşa
- Yeni Mahalle
- Yenidoğan
- Yıldıztabya

== Gaziosmanpaşa today ==
The urban fabric of the district is dominated by redeveloped former gecekondu housing. An improvement plan of 1992 gave many gecekondu owners full or provisional title deeds and extended the power and water networks. In 2006 the district was designated a second-tier urban centre in the Istanbul master plan, and private commercial investment has been accompanied by public investment in physical and social infrastructure.

From 2005 the municipality prepared redevelopment plans for selected neighbourhoods, and thirteen urban regeneration areas, nearly a third of all such designations in Greater Istanbul, were declared in the district under the Urban Regeneration Law of 2012. In renewal areas such as Sarıgöl, the population includes immigrant families from Bulgaria and Yugoslavia, migrants from the Black Sea region, and Roma, some of them displaced from Sulukule; unemployment remains a serious problem in these areas. Redevelopment projects such as Sarıgöl–Yenidoğan have faced opposition and court challenges from residents and professional bodies over displacement and inadequate provision of transport and community facilities. Urban renewal has been expected to raise house prices in the district.

== International relations ==
Sister cities:

- Tutin, Serbia
