= Istanbul Waste Power Plant =

Power station in Turkey

- Official name: İBB Atık Yakma ve Enerji Üretim Tesisi
- Country: Turkey
- Location: Işıklar Mah., Eyüp, Istanbul
- Coordinates: 41°13′30″N 28°48′54″E
- Status: Operational
- Construction began: 16 September 2017
- Commission date: November 26, 2021; 4 years ago
- Owner: Istanbul Metropolitan Municipality
- Operator: İstanbul Environmental Management Co. (İSTAÇ)
- Thermal capacity: 175 MW⋅h

Power generation
- Nameplate capacity: 78 MW⋅h

Istanbul Waste Power Plant (Turkish: İBB Atık Yakma ve Enerji Ürestim Tesisi) is a waste-to-energy facility in the Eyüp district of Istanbul near the Odayeri landfill, Turkey, using waste incineration. Opened in 2021 it is owned by the Istanbul Metropolitan Municipality (İBB) and operated by İstanbul Environmental Management Co. (İSTAÇ). It is Turkey's first power plant of this type. Project development started in 2011 with a grant from the United States Trade Development Agency (USTDA) which involved first a Definitional Mission and subsequently a detailed Feasibility Assessment.

== Overview ==
The waste-to-energy plant was built by a consortium of the Swiss Hitachi Zosen Inova and the Turkish Makyol. Construction began on 16 September 2017. Located in the Işıklar (formerly Kısırmandıra) neighborhood of the Eyüp district of Istanbul, it was opened on 26 November 2021. The plant is owned by the Istanbul Metropolitan Municipality (İBB) and operated by İstanbul Environmental Management Co. (İSTAÇ), a subsidiary of the Metropolitan Municipality. It is Turkey's first waste-to-energy facility. Kömürcüoda on the Asia side also generates electricity.

== Characteristics ==
The plant is capable of incinerating 3,000 tons of waste daily, 15% of Istanbul's daily domestic waste. The three incinerators each of 1,000 tons capacity reach about 850–1,100 °C (1,560–2,010 °F). It can generate 78 MW⋅h electrical energy and 175 MW⋅h thermal energy. The generated electricity is equivalent to the needs of nearly 1.4 million people. A reduction of greenhouse gas emissions amounting to 1.38 million tons can be achieved, which is the amount of exhaust gas emission of about 700.000 vehicles. In 2023 the nearby Odayeri landfill was estimated by Climate Trace to have emitted over 6 million tonnes of CO2eq. 90 people are employed in the facility. The plant saves a waste landfill storage area of 100 ha (250 acres).
