= Bayrampaşa =

- District and municipality
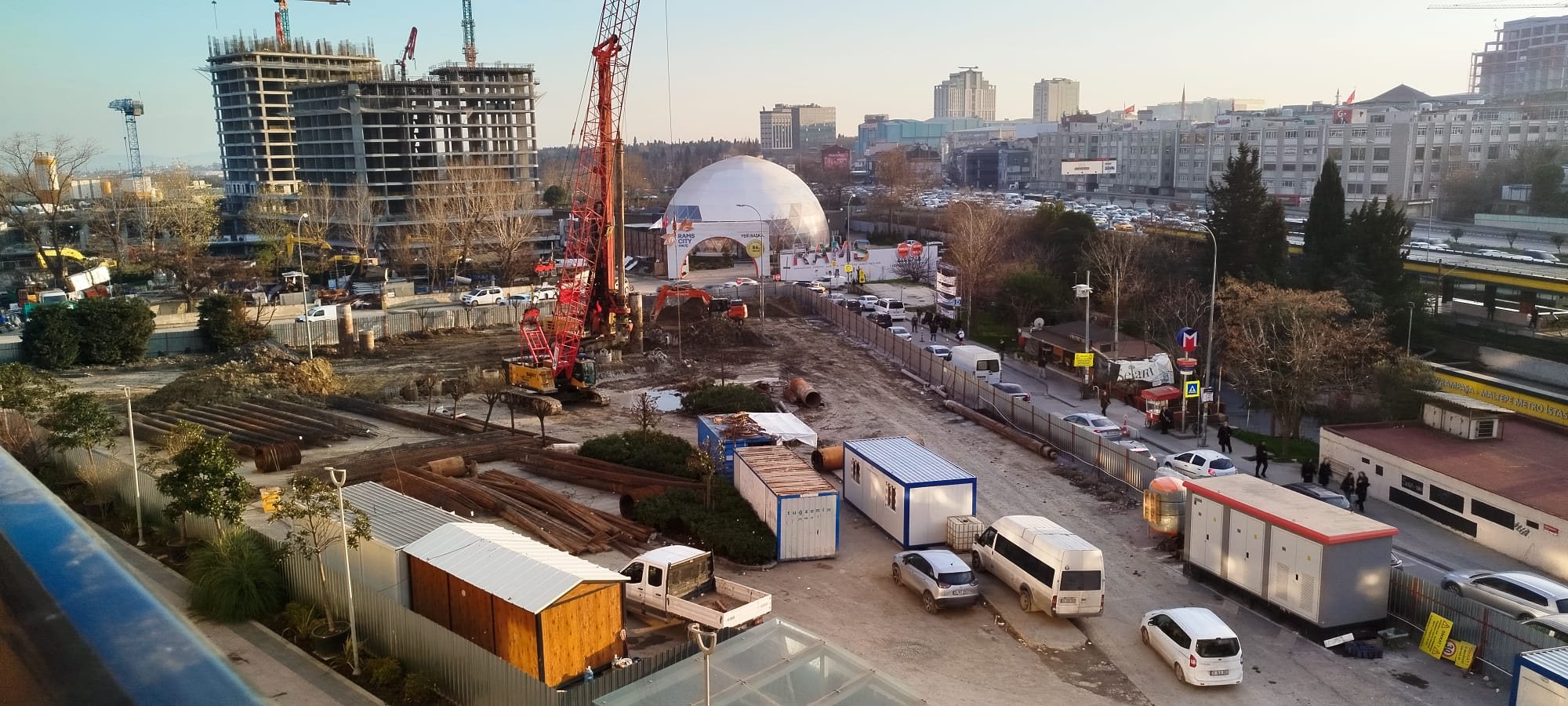
- Bayrampaşa tramway station under construction, 2025

- Logo

- Map showing Bayrampaşa District in Istanbul Province

- Location within Turkey Location within Istanbul
- Coordinates: 41°02′53″N 28°54′01″E
- Country: Turkey
- Province: Istanbul

Government
  - Mayor: Hasan Mutlu (CHP)
- Area: 9 km^{2} (3.5 sq mi)
- Elevation: 17 m (56 ft)
- Population (2022): 275,314
  - Density: 31,000/km^{2} (79,000/sq mi)
- Time zone: UTC+3 (TRT)
- Area code: 0212
- Website: www.bayrampasa.bel.tr

Bayrampaşa (pronounced [bajˈɾampaʃa]) is a municipality and district of Istanbul Province, Turkey. Its area is 9km^{2} (3.4 sq mi, 2,000 acres, 800 ha) and its population is 275,314 (2022). It is on the European side of the city.

The mayor is Hasan Mutlu (CHP), in office since April 2024.

== History ==
The district was created in 1990 from part of the Eyüp district. Before 1936, Bayrampaşa was part of Fatih district.

Until 1970, the area was known as Sağmalcılar, when a large outbreak of cholera, caused by pollution of the Ottoman-built water supply by new buildings and factories, led to the area being quarantined. Following this incident, the name Sağmalcılar became synonymous with cholera, so the district was renamed Bayrampaşa, after the 17th-century Ottoman grand vizier Bayram Pasha. Little of the Ottoman water system, which was built by Mimar Sinan, remains today.

On 1 December 2015, an explosion occurred near Bayrampaşa metro station, leaving several injured.

== Economy ==
Before 1970, Bayrampaşa’s economy was primarily agricultural. Following rapid urbanization and waves of migration after the 1970s, the district shifted towards a more industrial and trade-based economy. Today, while some residents work outside the district, many are employed in local trades or industrial jobs.

Bayrampaşa is not home to heavy industry, but it has become a hub for light manufacturing and services, including automotive repair, spare parts production, tool manufacturing, electrical and electronic components, plastic casting, metalwork, machining, and textiles. The district has no agricultural zones.

== Geography ==
The people of Bayrampaşa are mainly Albanians and Bosniaks.

The housing in Bayrampaşa is generally considered to be of poor quality, with workshops and small factories even in the residential streets, while large areas of the district are purely industrial. The district comprises both working class residential and industrial areas.

The district's neighbours are Gaziosmanpaşa to the north, Eyüp to the east, Zeytinburnu to the south, and Esenler to the west.

A number of important public buildings are in the area:

- Istanbul's largest prison (currently decommissioned)
- two large sports complexes
- the main bus station (which is actually in Bayrampaşa, although it is named Esenler bus station)

Bayrampaşa lies on the route of the old road to Thrace and a number of major roads and a light railway run through the middle of the area.

Bayrampaşa is famous for its artichokes produced in the past, but now although there is no production in the region its name is given to a variety of artichoke in Turkey. A large statue of an artichoke is located in the middle of the district which has become a symbol of the region.

The local football team based in the district is called Bayrampaşaspor.

== Composition ==
There are 11 neighbourhoods in Bayrampaşa District:

- Altıntepsi
- Cevatpaşa
- İsmetpaşa
- Kartaltepe
- Kocatepe
- Muratpaşa
- Orta
- Terazidere
- Vatan
- Yenidoğan
- Yıldırım

== Twin cities ==
- Novi Pazar, Serbia

== Bibliography ==
- "Information on Bayrampaşa district" (in Turkish). Governorship of Istanbul. 2009. Archived from the original on 2009-12-13.
