= Eyüpsultan =

- District and municipality
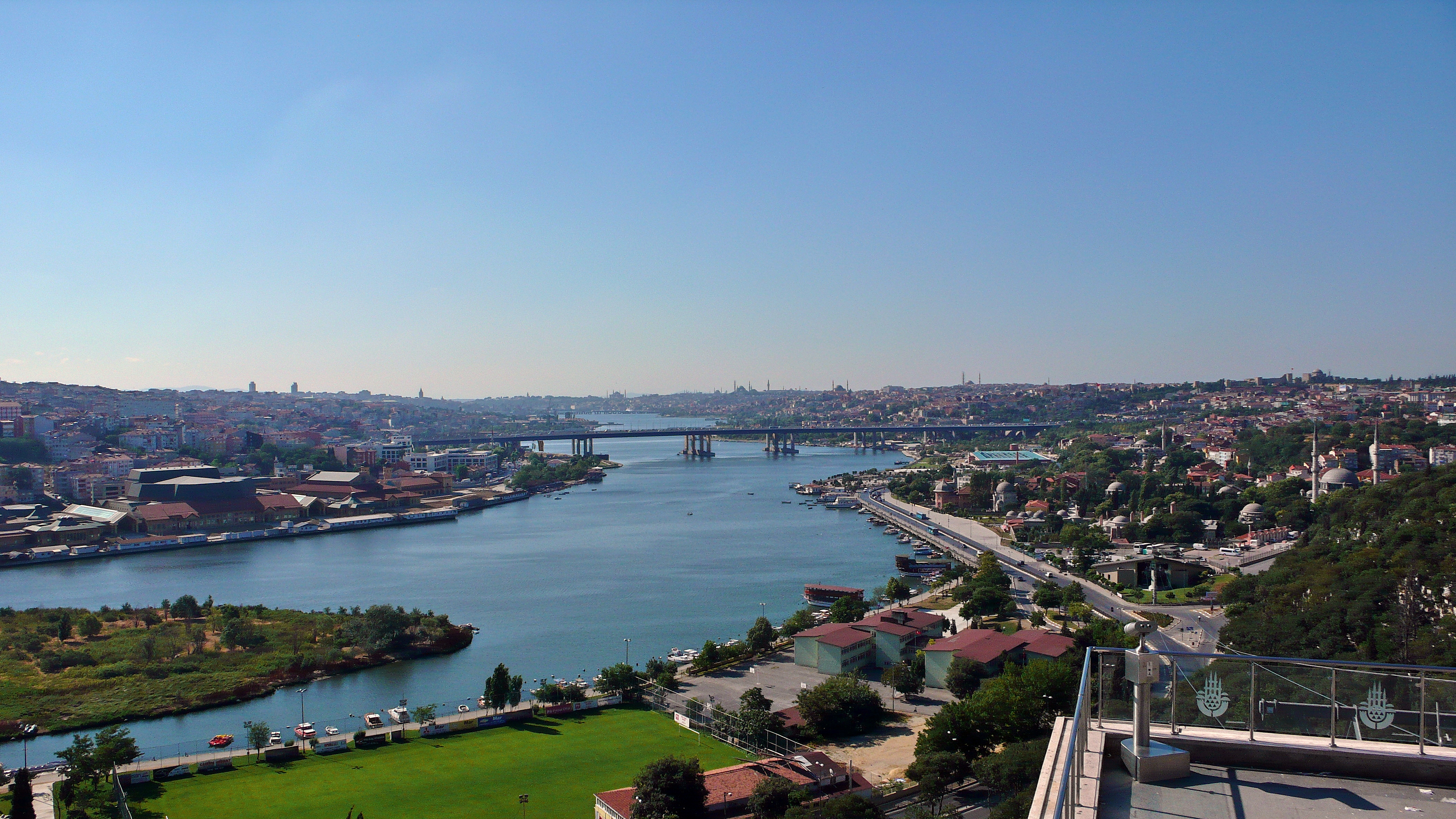
- View of Golden Horn

- Logo

- Map showing Eyüpsultan District in Istanbul Province

- Location within Turkey Location within Istanbul
- Coordinates: 41°2′20″N 28°56′05″E
- Country: Turkey
- Province: Istanbul

Government
  - Mayor: Mithat Bülent Özmen (CHP)
- Area: 228 km^{2} (88 sq mi)
- Population (2022): 422,913
  - Density: 1,850/km^{2} (4,800/sq mi)
- Time zone: UTC+3 (TRT)
- Area code: 0212
- Website: www.eyupsultan.bel.tr

Eyüpsultan or Eyüp (pronounced [ˈejyp]) is a municipality and district of Istanbul Province, Turkey. Its area is 228 km^{2}, and its population is 422,913 (2022). The district extends from the Golden Horn all the way to the shore of the Black Sea. Eyüp is also the name of a prominent neighborhood and former village in the district, located at the confluence of the Kâğıthane and Alibey streams at the head of the Golden Horn. The Eyüp neighborhood is a historically important area, especially for Turkish Muslims, due to the presence of the tomb of Abu Ayyub al-Ansari, the prominent Medinan companion (Ansar) and standard-bearer of the Islamic prophet Muhammad.

It became a district centre in 1936, after some parts of Fatih, Çatalca and Sarıyer were joined; later it also included Gaziosmanpaşa and Bayrampaşa districts. Its present boundaries were established after the borough of Yayla was given to Sultangazi in 2009. Its neighbours are Sarıyer in the east, Kâğıthane and Beyoğlu in the southeast, Gaziosmanpaşa, Bayrampaşa, Fatih and Sultangazi in the south, Başakşehir in the southwest and Arnavutköy in the west. The municipality was named after Abu Ayyub al-Ansari by the Ottoman Turks.

== History ==
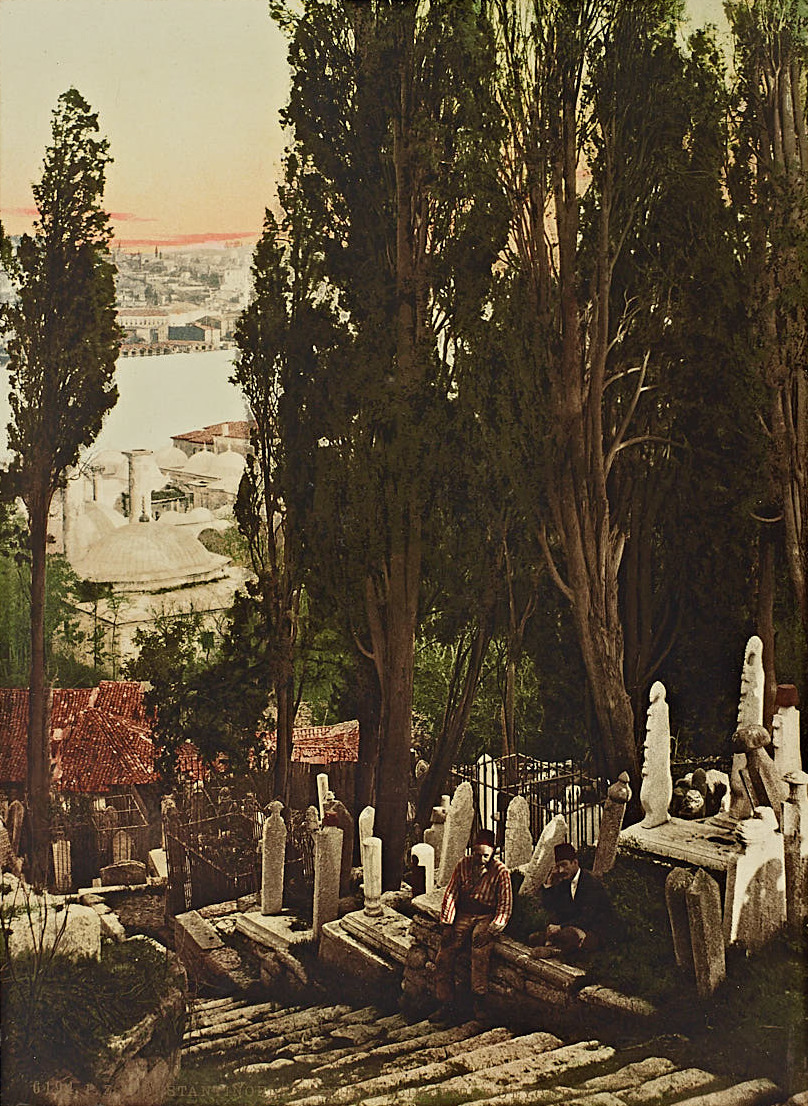
Eyüp Cemetery in 1899

Modern Eyüp was the site of a settlement already in the Byzantine period, best known as Kosmidion (Greek: Κοσμίδιον). Its name derives from the local monastery of the Anargyroi (Saints Cosmas and Damian), which was established in the fifth century. According to a later legend, it was founded by the magister Paulinus, who was executed by Theodosius II (r. 408–450) when the latter suspected him—erroneously—of having an affair with empress Aelia Eudocia. In reality, however, the monastery was probably founded ca. 480 by Paulina, the mother of the general and failed usurper Leontius. From her, the quarter was initially known as ta Paoulines (τα Παυλίνης, "Paulina's [quarter]"). The monastery was of some importance in the sixth century: its abbots participated in synods of 518 and 536, a collection of miracles associated with its patron saints appeared, and the monastery received a major renovation as part of the building programme of Justinian I (r. 527–565). In 623 and again in 626, the site was besieged and looted by the Avars.

By the early tenth century, the quarter that grew around the monastery had become known as Kosmidion; alternatively, but less likely, Kosmidion and ta Paoulines may have been neighbouring but separate localities. In 924, Emperor Romanos I Lekapenos (r. 920–944) met with the Bulgarian Tsar Simeon at a pier in Kosmidion during the Byzantine–Bulgarian war of 913–927. Theophylact Lekapenos, Romanos' son and Patriarch of Constantinople in 933–956, had his stables there.

Emperor Michael IV (r. 1034–41) renovated the monastery complex anew, and retired there following his abdication. He died there as a monk soon after. Due to its proximity to Constantinople, the site played a role in the civil wars of the period: it was the headquarters of the rebel Leo Tornikios (although other sources place his headquarters at Thermopolis) during his failed siege of the imperial capital in 1047, it was a base of John Bryennios, brother of the rebel general Nikephoros Bryennios the Elder, in 1077, and four years later, it was one of the first localities taken over by the Komnenoi in their successful coup against Nikephoros III Botaneiates (r. 1078–81). In 1096, the newly arrived First Crusade was allowed to encamp between Kosmidion and Hagios Phokas.

During the Fourth Crusade, Kosmidion was the site of one of the first skirmishes between the Crusaders and the Byzantines in July 1203, from which the Crusaders emerged victorious. In April 1204, shortly before the fall of the city to the Crusaders, the Venetian Doge Enrico Dandolo met with the newly crowned emperor Alexios V Mourtzouphlos for negotiations there.

Under Latin rule, the monastery seems not to have suffered too much; certainly it was fit to lodge Emperor Michael VIII Palaiologos (r. 1259–82) on the night of 14 August 1261, before his triumphal entry into recently recovered Constantinople the next day. In the next decades, the monastery was used as a place of exile for two disgraced patriarchs, Joseph I in 1280–82 and John XI Bekkos in 1285, while awaiting trial by the synod, and Athanasius I for the period before his abdication in 1293. A collection of miracles attributed to the monastery's patron saints since 1261 was compiled in ca. 1300 by a certain deacon Maximos.

In 1303 Spanish mercenaries from the Crown of Aragon in imperial service took over and fortified the monastery complex as a base of operations against the Genoese colony of Galata. Following the breach between the Empire and the Catalan Company in 1305, however, the Byzantines evacuated the site. In the 1348 war with the Genoese, the latter captured and burned all Byzantine ships in the Golden Horn, except the three being built in a dockyard in Kosmidion. In 1350 the monastery was visited by the Russian pilgrim Stephen of Novgorod. At about the same time, the existence of a church dedicated to a St. Theodore, as well as a chapel dedicated to the martyrs Thalelaios and Artemidoros, is known, without further information.

In 1410, during the Ottoman Interregnum, the contenders for the Ottoman throne, Musa Çelebi and Süleyman Çelebi, clashed at Kosmidion, with the latter emerging as the victor.

After the Fall of Constantinople, the quarter was renamed after Abu Ayyub al-Ansari (Turkish: Eyüp), a companion (Ansari) of Muhammad who fell in the First Arab Siege of Constantinople in 674–678. In 1581, Christians were prohibited from living there.

The area has long been used as a place of burial, largely due to its position outside the city of Istanbul. There are Christian churches and cemeteries as well as a large Muslim burial ground, the Eyüp Cemetery.

=== Eyüp during the Industrial Revolution ===
During the 17th and 18th centuries, Istanbul grew as the fringes of the Ottoman Empire became unsettled and refugees from Turkish communities in the Balkans and the Caucasus came to the city. During this period the Eyüp area transitioned into a main settlement area, this made it lose some of its spiritual air as factories were built along the Golden Horn. The first of these was the Feshane, the factory beside the Golden Horn where fezzes were manufactured for the Ottoman armies. The Feshane today is an exhibition center owned by the Istanbul Metropolitan Municipality.

During the WWI, the area was affected by the British bombing of İstanbul.

In the meantime, industry, the growing population, and the continuing flow of pilgrims encouraged the growth of the shopping district around and behind the mosque. The streets behind had fish and dairy markets, shops, cafes and bars for residents of the area, while the courtyard of the mosque itself had people selling scriptures and prayer beads to visitors.

From the mid-20th century onward, the area took on a more "working class" feel as wealthier residents of Istanbul preferred to buy housing on the Asian side of the city or along the Bosphorus, since the Golden Horn was becoming increasingly polluted and unpleasant due to industrial development. The industrial zone expanded as major roads were built through the Eyüp area. The market gardens and flower fields of Alibeyköy disappeared.

=== Eyüp today ===
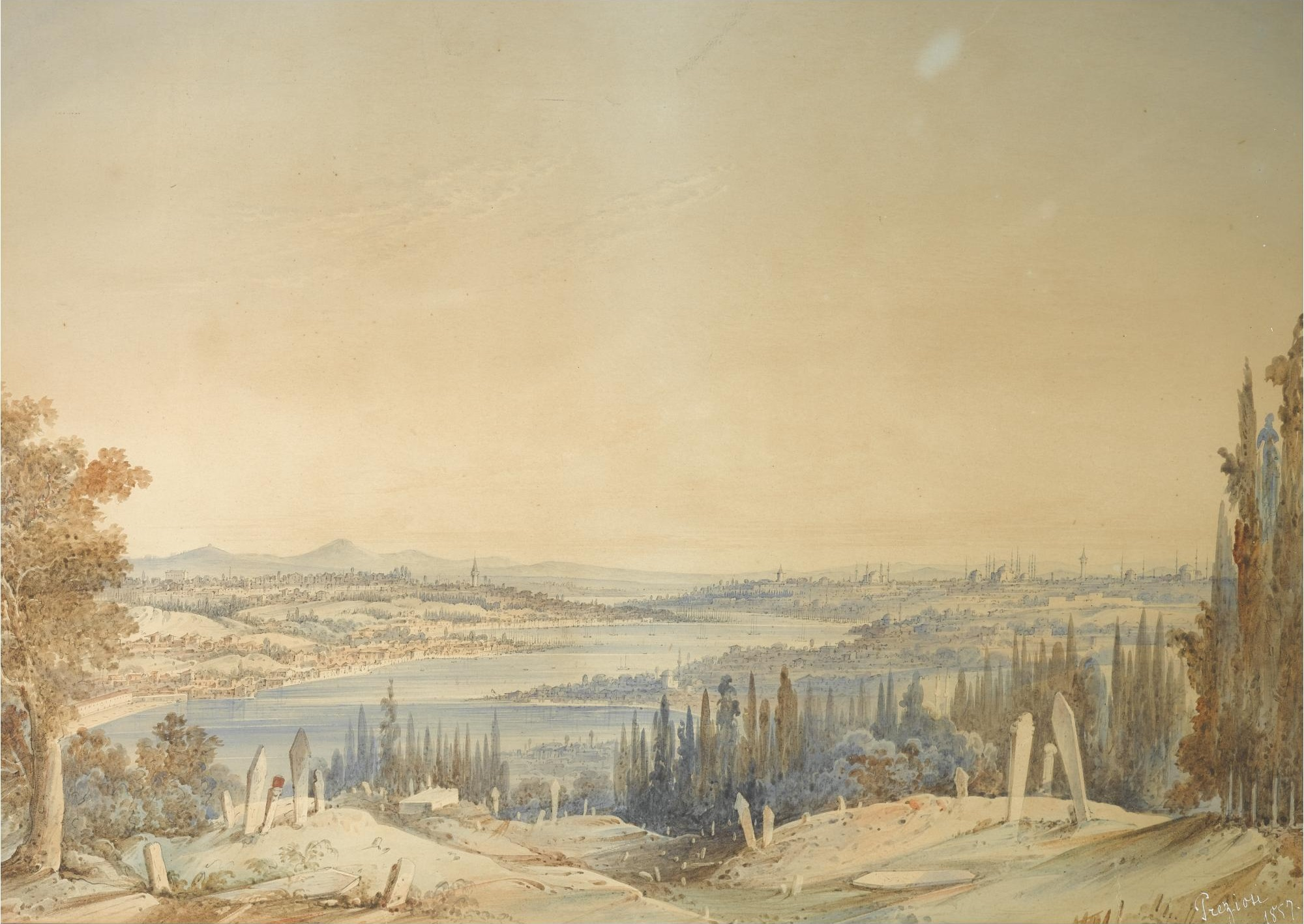
View from Eyüp towards the Golden Horn painted by the Maltese 19th-century watercolour artist Amedeo Preziosi.

In recent years many of the factories have been closed or cleaned up, and it is possible to sit by the waterside. The area has also increasingly attracted conservative Muslim families.

The Eyüp Sultan Mosque continues to draw tourists visiting Istanbul, as well as larger numbers of Turkish religious pilgrims. At Friday prayer and throughout Ramadan, the area is full of visitors from all over the city. Pilgrims to the mosque include a wide range of Muslims, especially before weddings or circumcisions.

In recent years, a thriving market has grown around the mosque selling prayer mats, beads, dates from Saudi Arabia, scented oils, Islamic books, recordings of Koran recitation, and other items. On Fridays, a marching band plays Ottoman military music, mehter, giving the area around the mosque a carnival atmosphere with an Islamic twist. In Ramadan, the area in front of the mosque is taken over by large tents where food is served at the evening fast breaking.

The main building of the 2010-established Istanbul Sabahattin Zaim University is situated in a historic building in Eyüp.

A gondola lift brings visitors from the shore of the Golden Horn up to the outdoor Pierre Loti Café (Turkish: Piyerloti Kahvesi), a popular spot offering a panoramic view of the Golden Horn, named after the 19th-century French writer Pierre Loti (pseudonym of Julien Viaud), who wrote two novels based on his stay in Istanbul.

== Composition ==
There are 29 neighbourhoods in Eyüpsultan District:

- 5. Levent
- Ağaçlı
- Akpınar
- Akşemsettin
- Alibeyköy
- Çiftalan
- Çırçır
- Defterdar
- Düğmeciler
- Emniyettepe
- Esentepe
- Eyüp Merkez
- Göktürk Merkez
- Güzeltepe
- İhsaniye
- Işıklar
- İslambey
- Karadolap
- Mimar Sinan
- Mithatpaşa
- Nişanca
- Odayeri
- Pirinççi
- Rami Cuma
- Rami Yeni
- Sakarya
- Silahtarağa
- Topçular
- Yeşilpınar

== Historical places ==
=== Mosque and türbe of Abu Ayyub ===
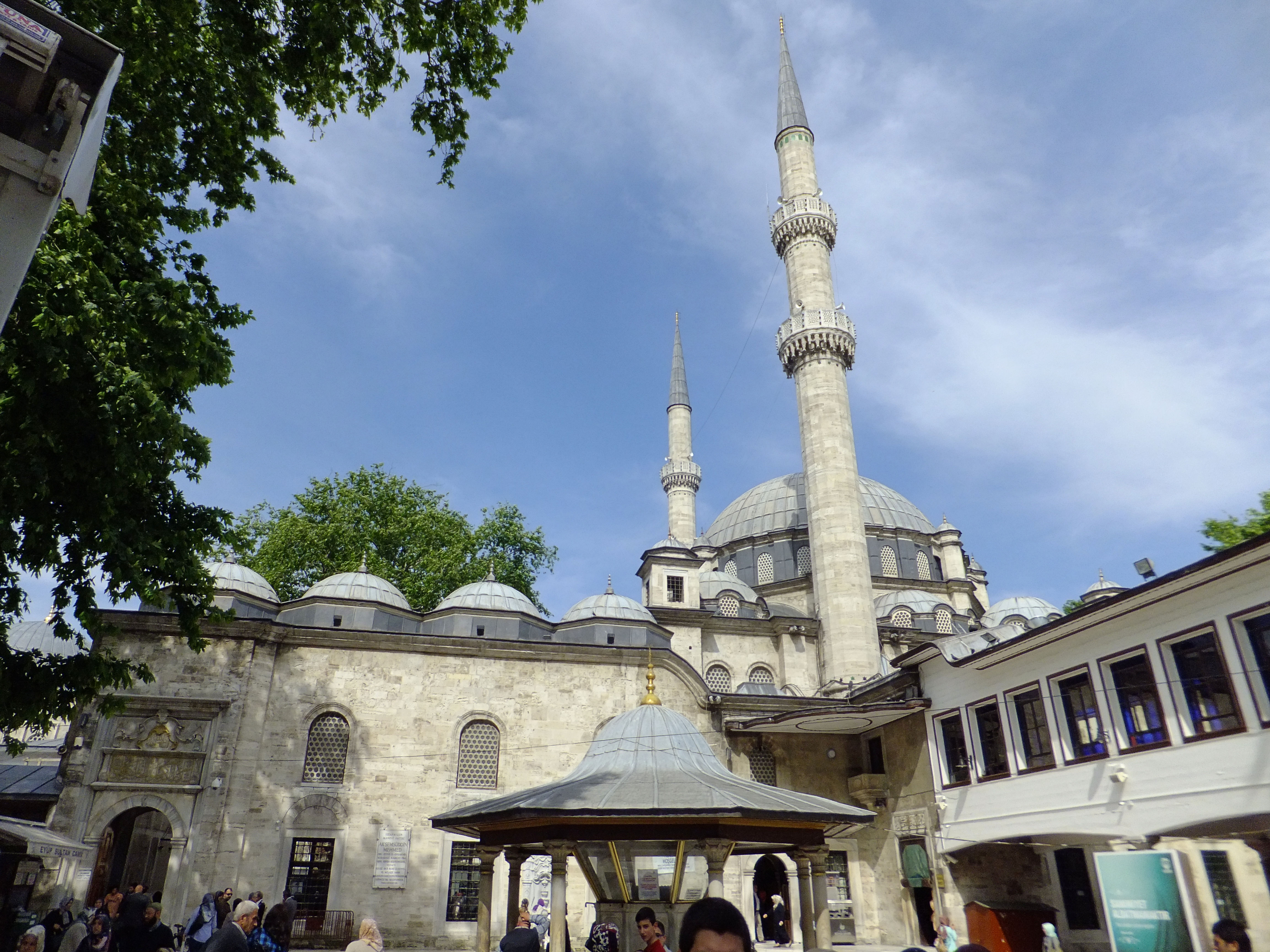
Eyüp Sultan Mosque

Muslim sources report that several important personalities of early Islam took part in the 674–678 CE siege, such as Ibn Abbas, Ibn Umar and Ibn al-Zubayr. Abu Ayyub eventually emerged as the most prominent among them. According to Muslim tradition, Constantine IV threatened to destroy his tomb, but the Caliph warned that if he did so, the Christians under his rule would suffer. Thus the tomb was left in peace, and allegedly became a site of veneration by the Byzantines, who prayed there in times of drought. The tomb was "rediscovered" after the Ottoman conquest of Constantinople in 1453 by the dervish Sheikh Ak Shams al-Din, and Sultan Mehmed II (r. 1444–1446, 1451–1481) ordered the construction of a marble tomb and the Eyüp Sultan Mosque adjacent to it. It became a tradition that Ottoman sultans were girt with the Sword of Osman at the Eyüp mosque upon their accession.

From that point on, Eyüp became a sacred place. Relics were displayed in the tomb, including a stone said to bear the footprint of Muhammad. More mosques, schools, tekkes, and fountains were built, and since many Ottoman officials wished to be buried near Abu Ayyub's resting place, the cemetery became one of Istanbul's most desirable.

=== Other monuments ===
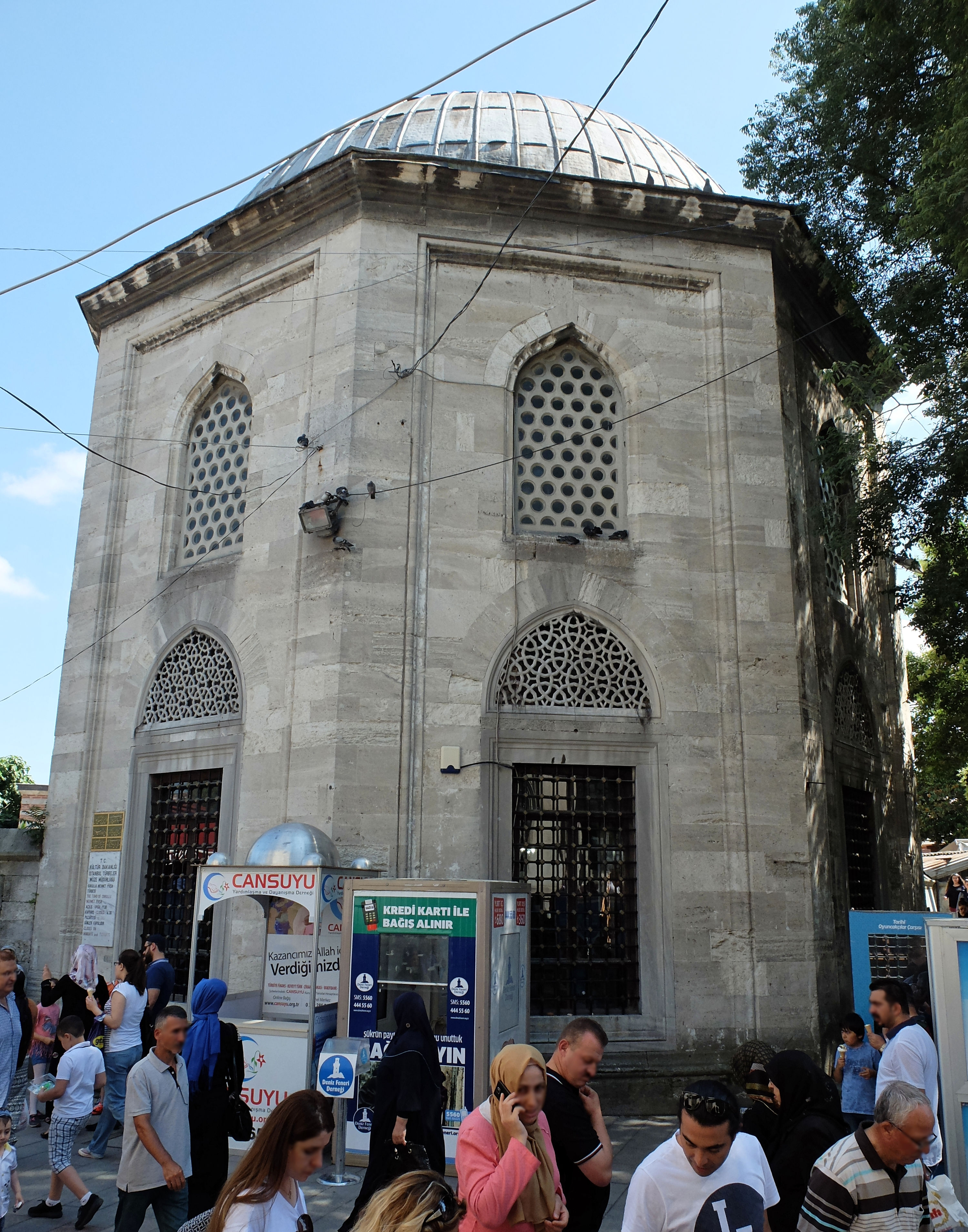
Tomb of Sokollu Mehmed Pasha

A number of Ottoman religious and funerary complex are also located in the vicinity of the Eyüp Sultan Mosque or along the shore of the Golden Horn, dating from different periods. These include:

- Mihrişah Sultan Complex (1796)
- Tomb and complex of Sokollu Mehmed Pasha (circa 1572)
- Tomb of Siyavuş Pasha (1584)
- Tomb of Ferhat Pasha (c. 1595)
- Tombg of Pertev Pasha (1573)
- Tomb and library of Hüsrev Pasha (1839)
- Tomb of Mehmet V (circa 1918)
- Zal Mahmud Pasha Mosque (before 1584)
- Tomb of Şah Sultan (1800–1)

== See also ==
- Istanbul Waste Power Plant
