= Kargo Terminali station =

Station of the Istanbul Metro

Kargo Terminali
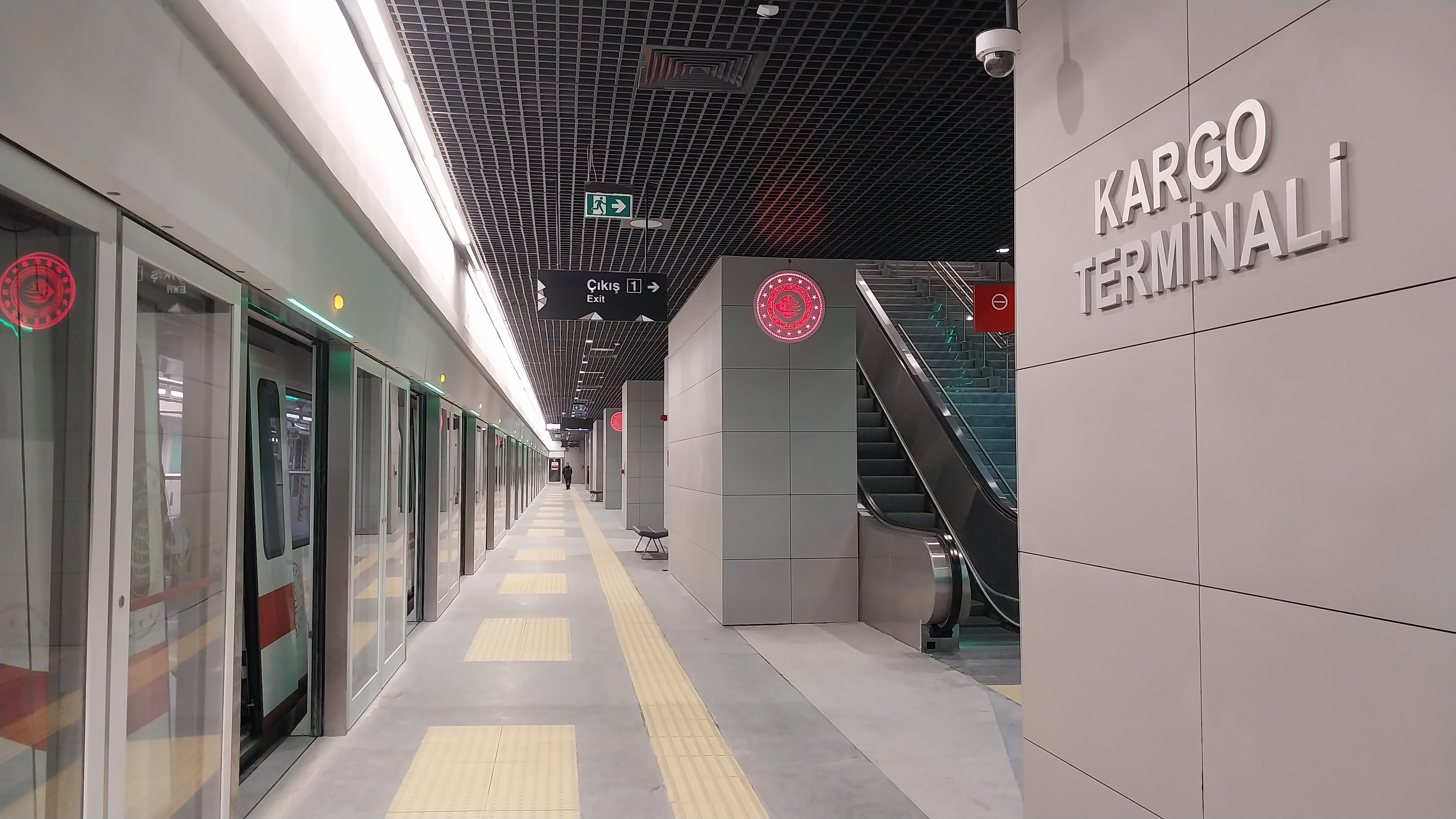

General information
- Location: Tayakadın Neighborhood, Istanbul Airport Cargo Terminal, 34277; Arnavutköy, Istanbul; Turkey
- Coordinates: 41°15′19″N 28°42′46″E
- System: Istanbul Metro rapid transit station
- Owner: Ministry of Transport and Infrastructure
- Operator: TCDD Transport
- Line: M11
- Platforms: 1 Island platform
- Tracks: 2
- Connections: İETT Bus: H-1, H-2, H-3, H-6, H-7, H-8, H-9; Istanbul Airport

Construction
- Structure type: Underground
- Parking: Yes (paid airport parking)
- Cycle facilities: Yes
- Accessible: Yes

History
- Opened: 22 January 2023 (3 years ago)
- Electrified: 1,500 V DC Overhead line

Services
Preceding station	Istanbul Metro	Following station
Taşoluk towards Halkalı	M11 Line	Istanbul Airport towards Gayrettepe
Location

Kargo Terminali (Cargo Terminal) is an underground rapid transit station on the M11 line of the Istanbul Metro. It is located in the Tayakadın neighborhood of Arnavutköy district, serving Istanbul Airport. The station is among the first five metro stations to be located outside of the city (urban area) of Istanbul. It was opened on 22 January 2023, and was the northern terminus of the line before the southwestern extension to Arnavutköy Hastane opened on 19 March 2024.

== History ==
Construction of the station began in 2016, along with the entire route from Gayrettepe to the Istanbul Airport.

== Layout ==
Westbound	← toward Halkalı (Taşoluk)
Island platform, doors will open on the left
Eastbound	toward Gayrettepe (Istanbul Airport) →

== Operation information ==
The line operates between 06:00 and 00:40 and train frequency is 20 minutes. The line has no night service.

== Gallery ==
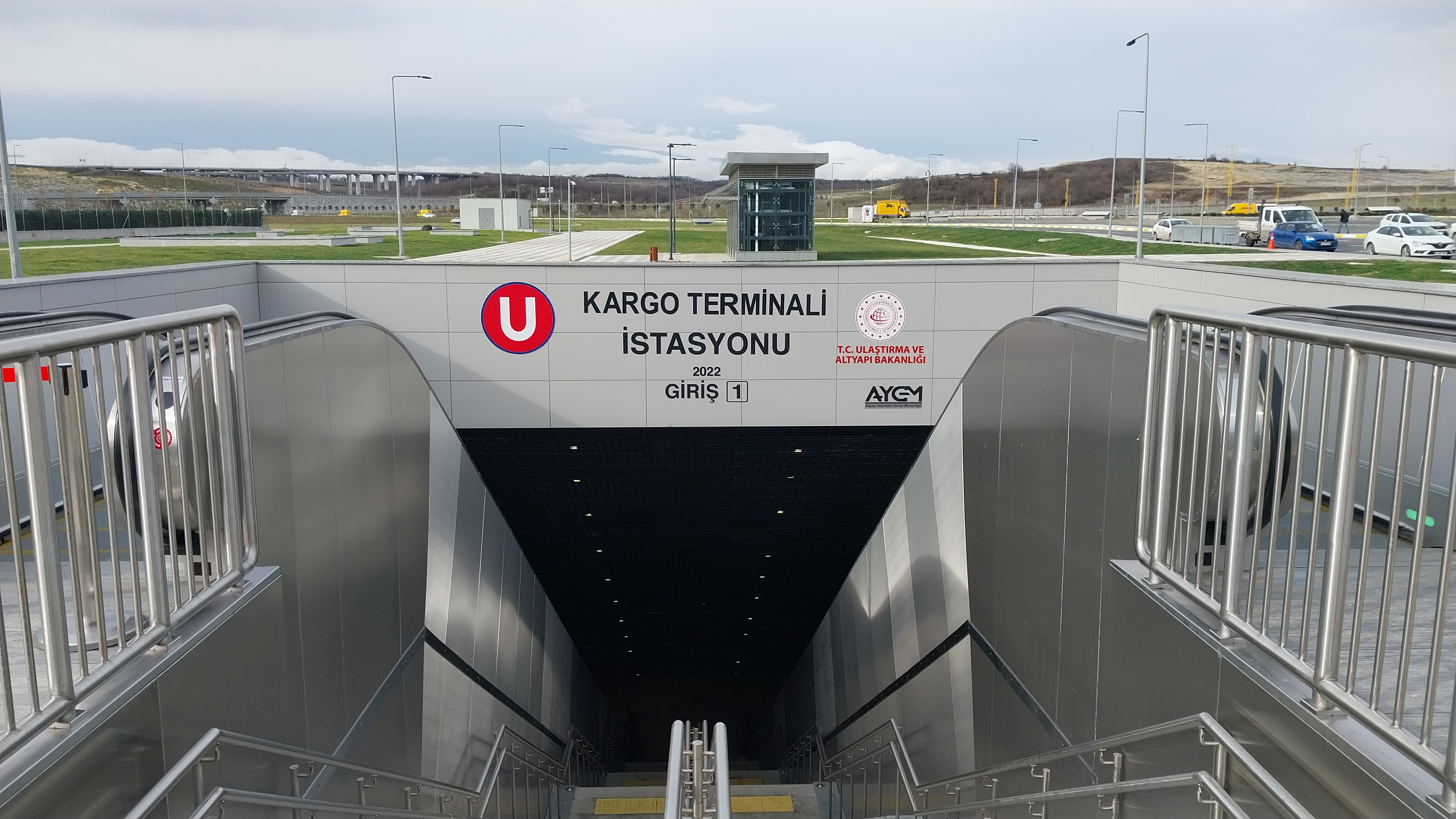
Entrance 1

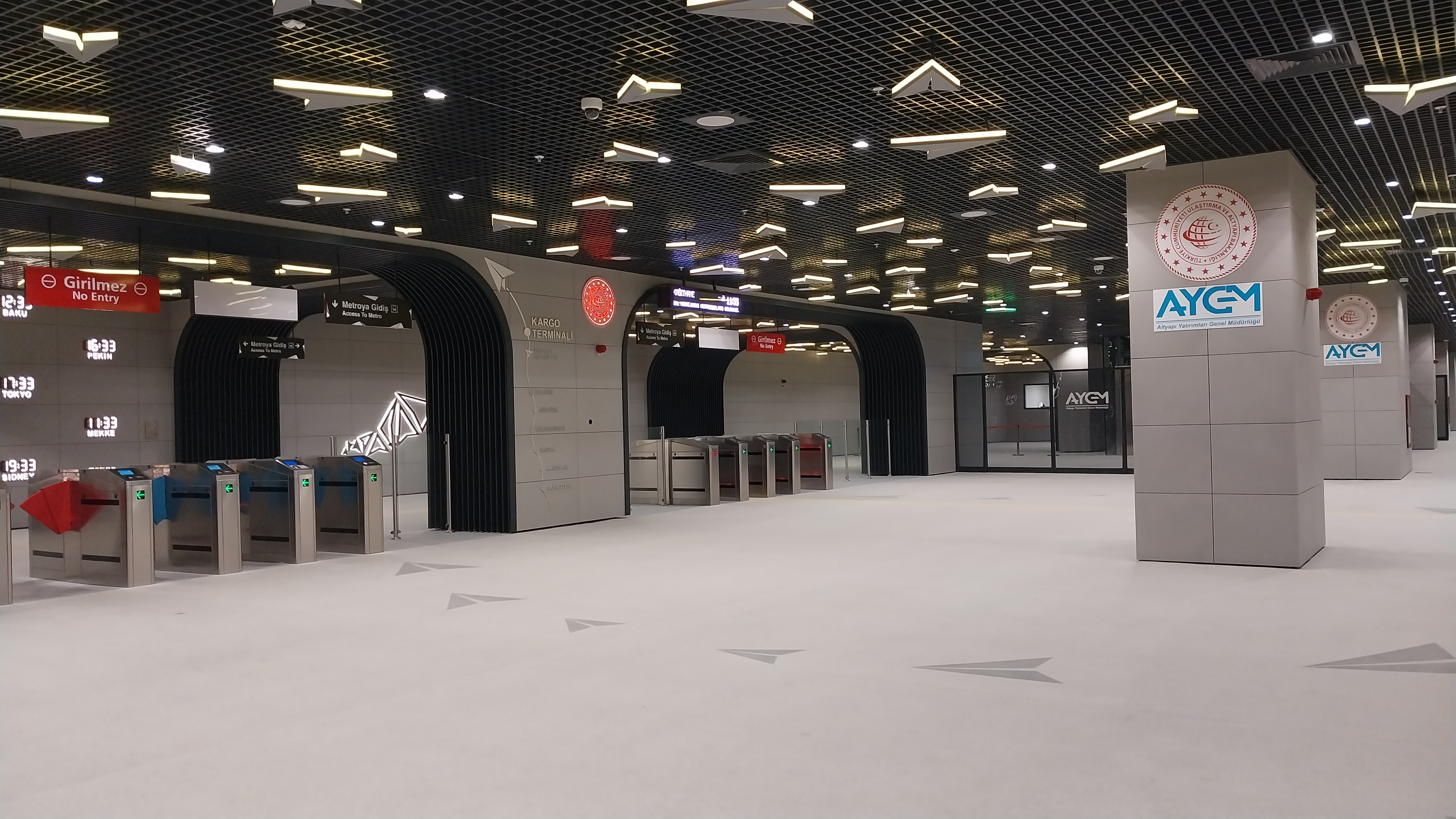
Ticket hall

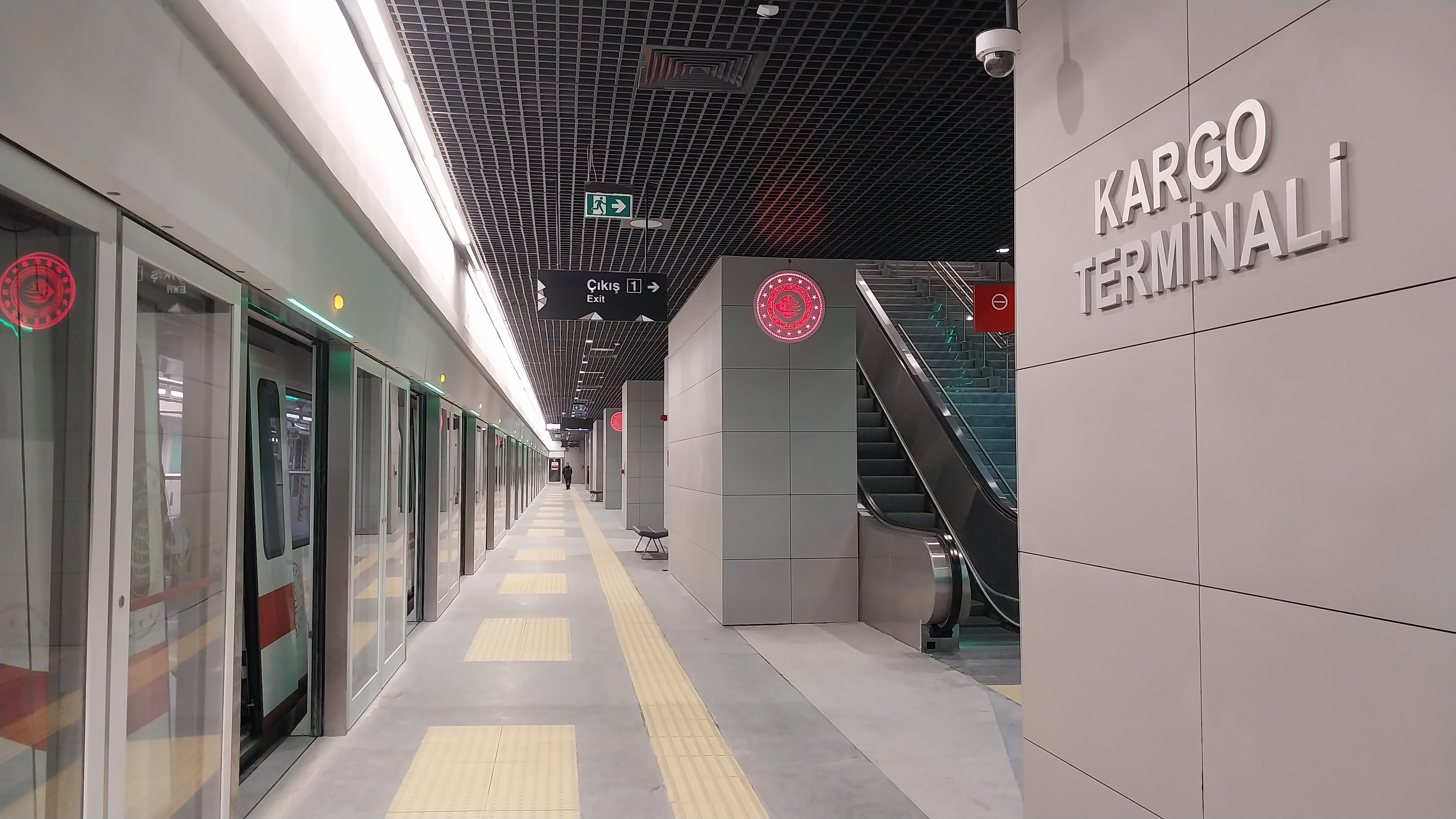
Platform
