= Taşoluk station =

Station of the Istanbul Metro

Taşoluk
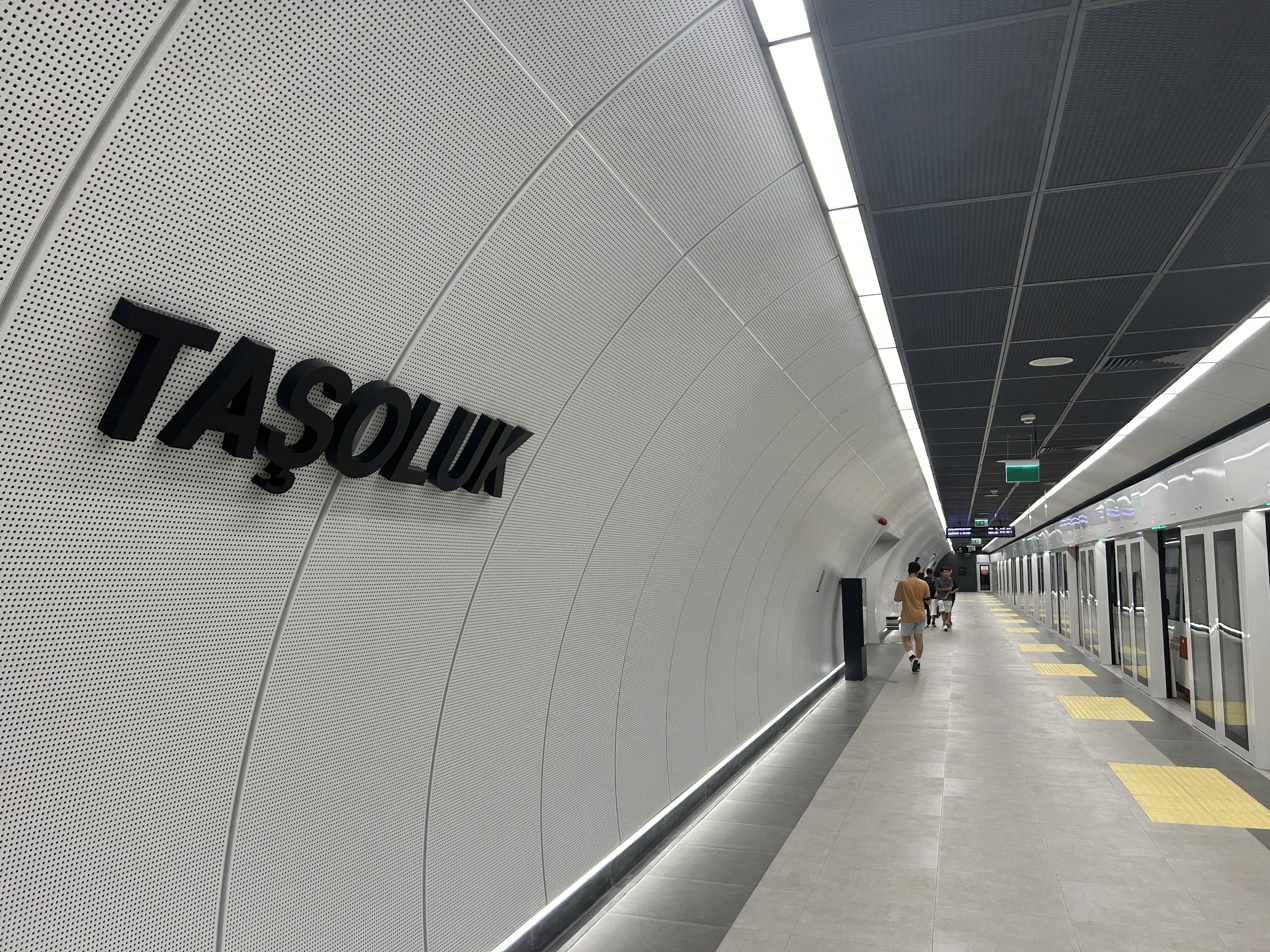
- Northbound platform

General information
- Location: Mareşal Fevzi Çakmak Neighborhood, Atatürk Street, 34283; Arnavutköy, Istanbul; Turkey
- Coordinates: 41°12′21″N 28°42′58″E
- System: Istanbul Metro rapid transit station
- Owner: Ministry of Transport and Infrastructure
- Operator: TCDD Transport
- Line: M11
- Platforms: 1 Island platform
- Tracks: 2
- Connections: İETT Bus: Sağlık Ocağı: 36HT

Construction
- Structure type: Underground
- Parking: No
- Cycle facilities: Yes
- Accessible: Yes

History
- Opened: 19 March 2024 (2 years ago)
- Electrified: 1,500 V DC Overhead line

Services
Preceding station	Istanbul Metro	Following station
Arnavutköy Hastane towards Halkalı	M11 Line	Kargo Terminali towards Gayrettepe
Location

Taşoluk is an underground station on the M11 line of the Istanbul Metro. It is located under Atatürk Street in the Mareşal Fevzi Çakmak neighborhood of Arnavutköy district. It was opened on 19 March 2024.

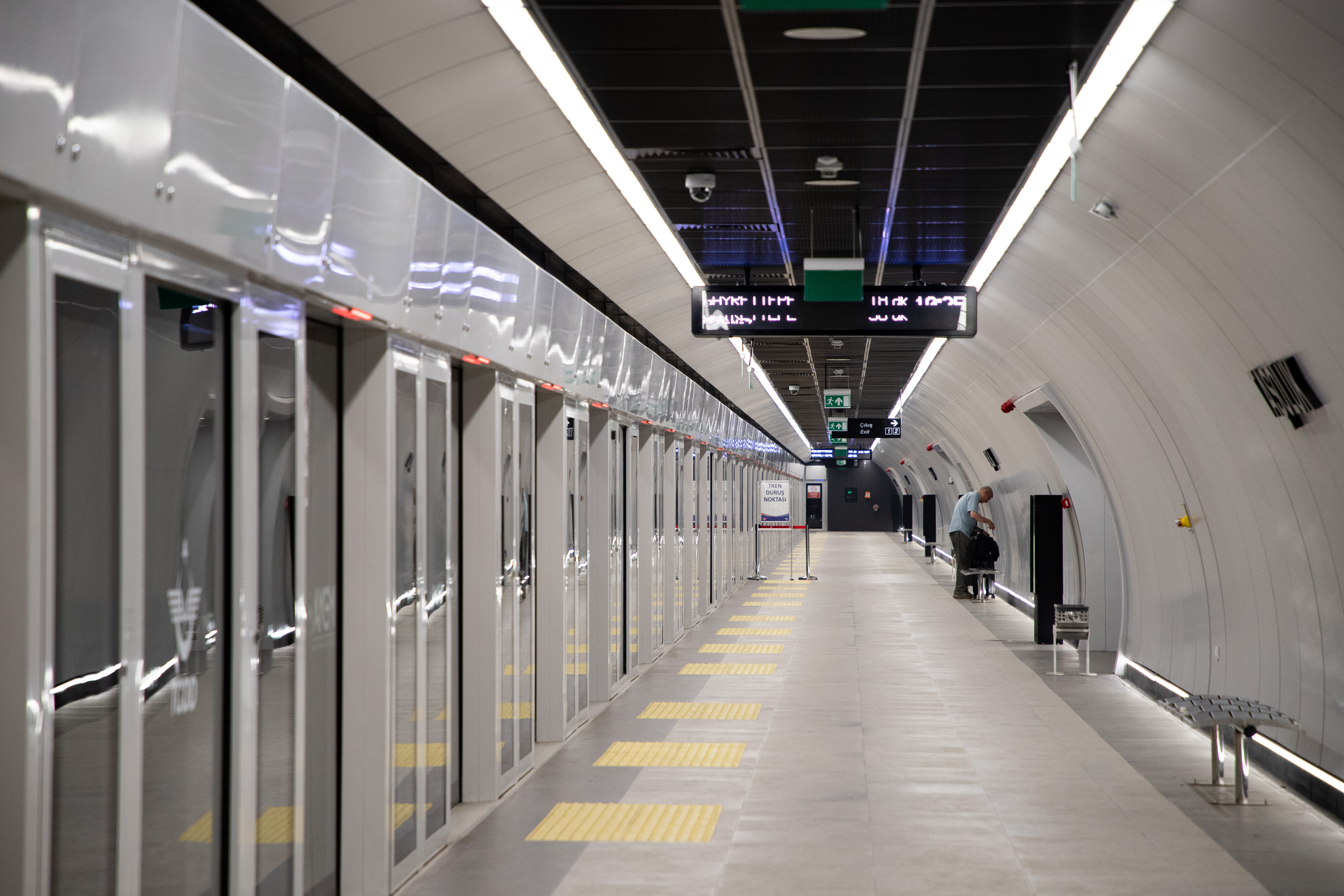
Northbound platform

== Layout ==
Southbound	← toward Halkalı (Arnavutköy Hastane)
Island platform, doors will open on the left
Northbound	toward Gayrettepe - Istanbul Airport (Kargo Terminali) →

== Operation information ==
The line operates between 06:00 and 00:40 and train frequency is 20 minutes. The line has no night service.
