= Arnavutköy Hastane station =

Station of the Istanbul Metro

Arnavutköy Hastane
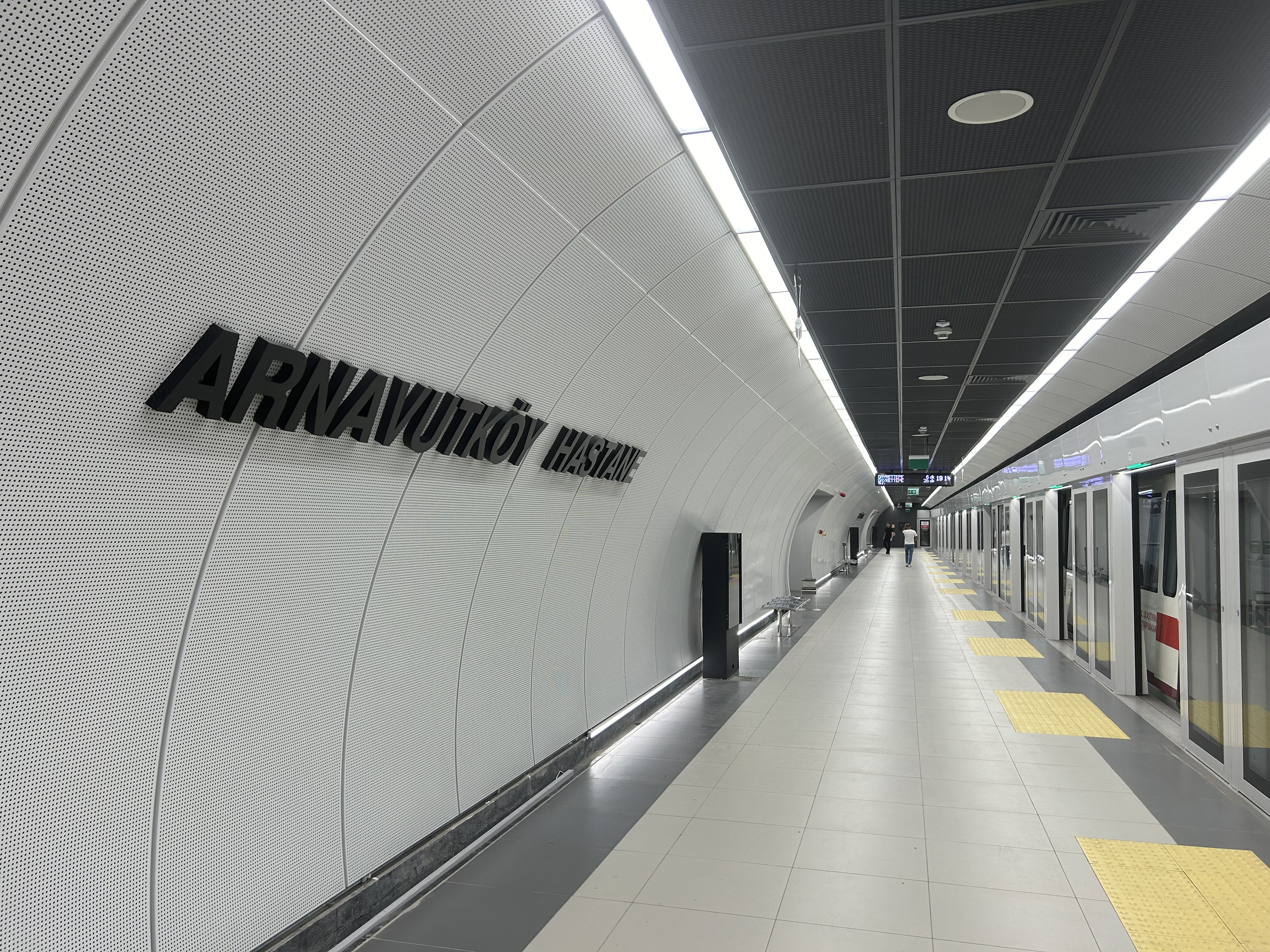
- Platform

General information
- Location: Anadolu Neighborhood, Eski Edirne Street, Arnavutköy City Park, 34275; Arnavutköy, Istanbul; Turkey
- Coordinates: 41°10′45″N 28°44′52″E
- System: Istanbul Metro rapid transit station
- Owner: Ministry of Transport and Infrastructure
- Operator: TCDD Transport
- Line: M11
- Platforms: 1 Island platform
- Tracks: 2
- Connections: İETT Bus: Arnavutköy Devlet Hastanesi: 36AS, 36AY, 36B, 36C, 36HT, 36TC, 36Y, 336, 336A, 336G, 336H, 36K, 336M, 336T, H-6, MK22; Arnavutköy: 36AY, 36C, 36D, 36YS, 48KA, 48M, 336, 336M

Construction
- Structure type: Underground
- Parking: No
- Cycle facilities: Yes
- Accessible: Yes

History
- Opened: 19 March 2024 (2 years ago)
- Electrified: 1,500 V DC Overhead line

Services
Preceding station	Istanbul Metro	Following station
İbn Haldun Üniversitesi towards Halkalı	M11 Line	Taşoluk towards Gayrettepe
Location

Arnavutköy Hastane is an underground station on the M11 line of the Istanbul Metro. It is located under Eski Edirne Street at Arnavutköy City Park in the Anadolu neighborhood of Arnavutköy district. It was opened on 19 March 2024, and was the western terminus of the line until the extension to Halkalı opened on 20 June 2026.

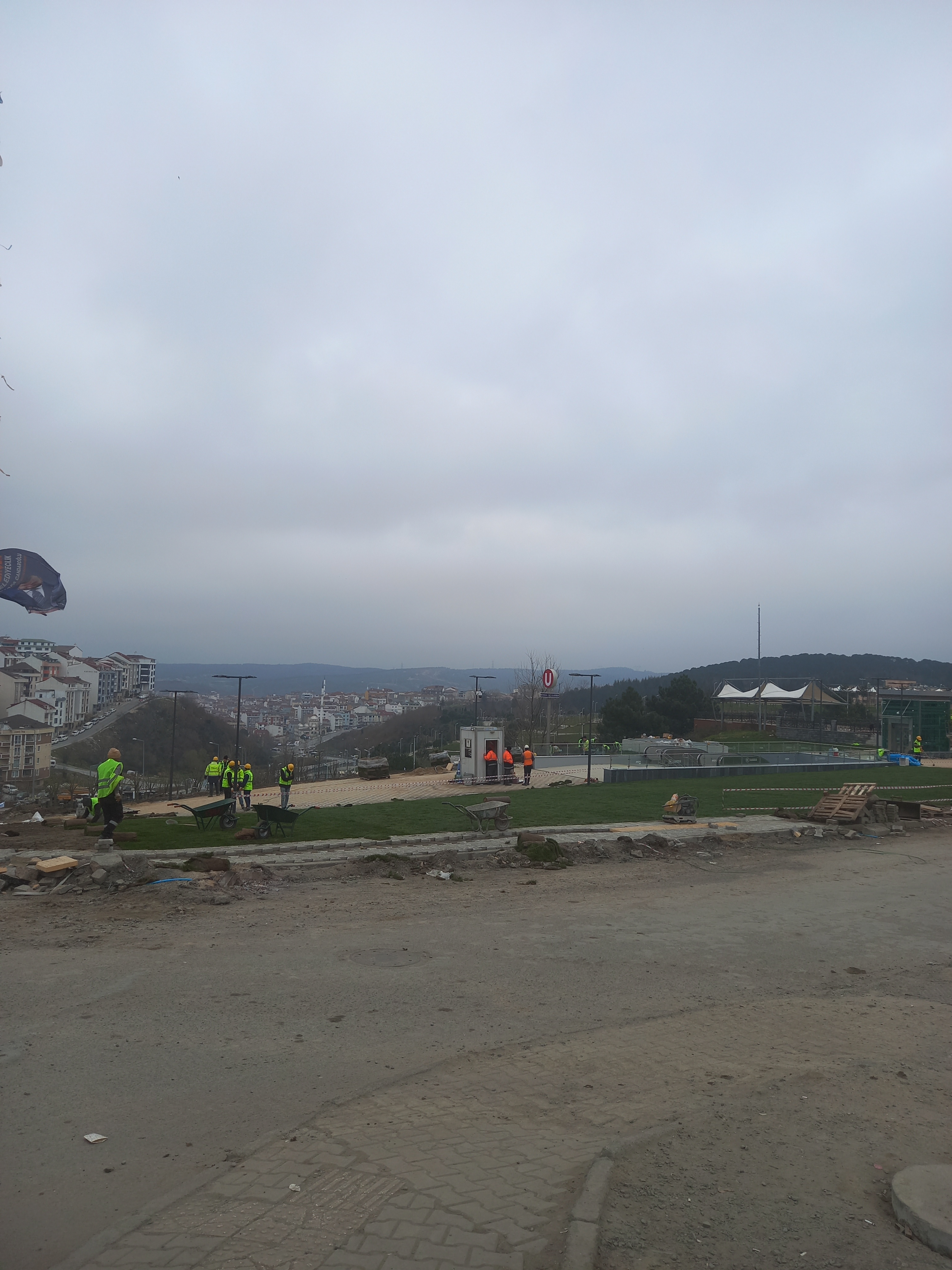
Station entrance

== Layout ==
Southbound	← toward Halkalı (İbn Haldun Üniversitesi)
Island platform, doors will open on the left
Northbound	toward Gayrettepe - Istanbul Airport (Taşoluk) →

== Operation information ==
The line operates between 06:00 and 00:40 and train frequency is 20 minutes. The line has no night service.
