= Terminal 2 station (Istanbul) =

Station of the Istanbul Metro

Terminal 2
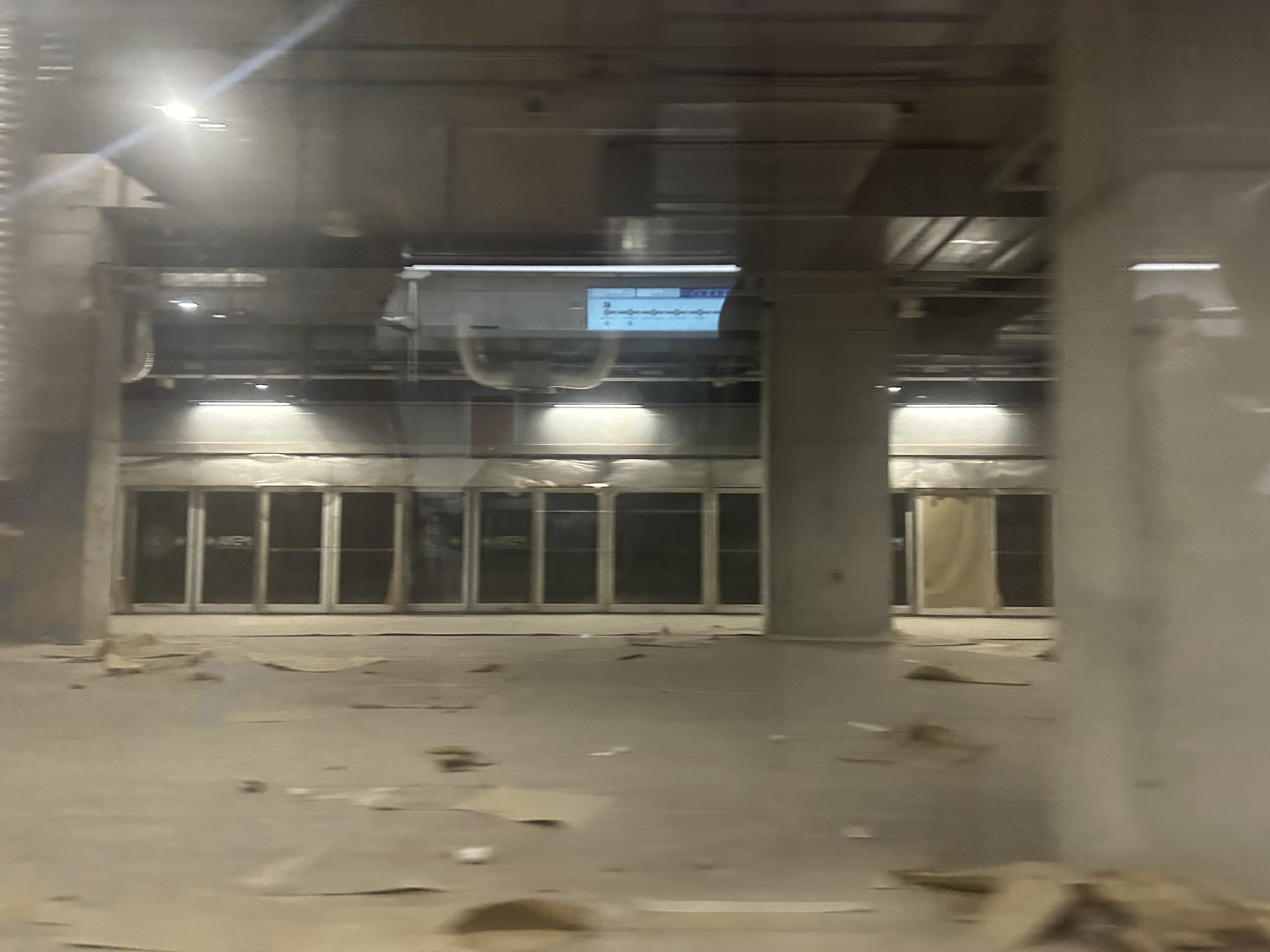
- Platform view from the train

General information
- Location: İmrahor Neighborhood, Istanbul Airport, 34275; Arnavutköy, Istanbul; Turkey
- Coordinates: 41°15′23″N 28°46′6″E
- System: Istanbul Metro rapid transit station
- Owner: Ministry of Transport and Infrastructure
- Operator: TCDD Transport
- Line: M11
- Platforms: 1 Island platform
- Tracks: 2
- Connections: İETT Bus: H-1, H-2, H-3, H-6, H-7, H-8, H-9; Istanbul Airport

Construction
- Structure type: Underground
- Parking: Yes (paid airport parking)
- Cycle facilities: Yes
- Accessible: Yes

Other information
- Status: Reserved

History
- Electrified: 1,500 V DC Overhead line

Services
Preceding station	Istanbul Metro	Following station
M11 Line does not stop here
Location

Terminal 2 (Istanbul Airport) is a reserved underground rapid transit station on the M11 line of the Istanbul Metro. It is located in the İmrahor neighborhood of Arnavutköy district, serving Istanbul Airport. The station will open when Istanbul Airport Terminal 2 is completed and opened.

== History ==
Construction of the station began in 2016, along with the entire route from Gayrettepe to the Istanbul Airport.

== Layout ==
Westbound	← does not stop here (Istanbul Airport)
Island platform, not open
Eastbound	does not stop here (İhsaniye) →
