= M11 (Istanbul Metro) =

Transit line in Istanbul, Turkey

M11 Gayrettepe–Istanbul Airport–Halkalı
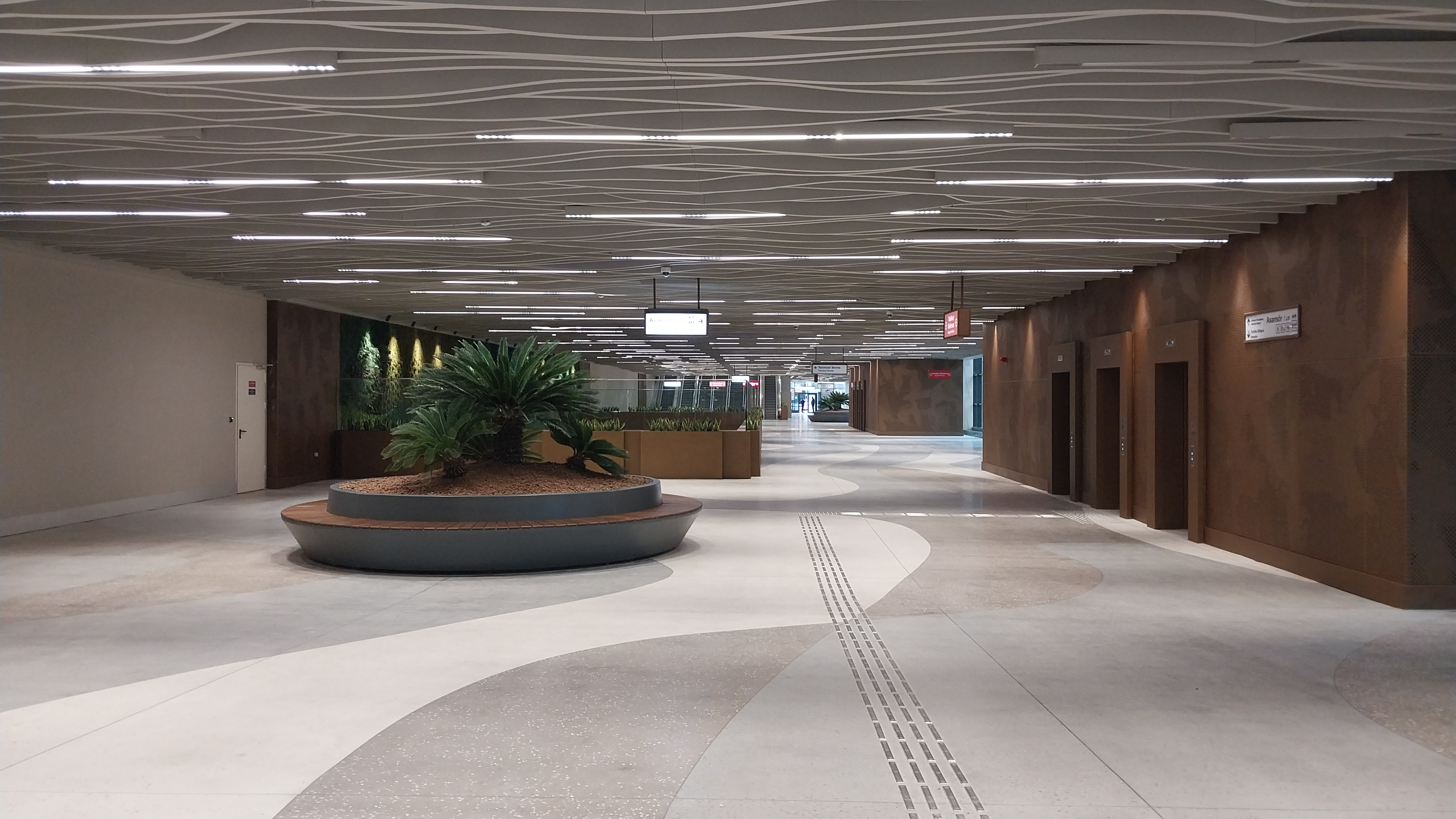
- Istanbul Airport Station

Overview
- Status: Operational
- Owner: Ministry of Transport and Infrastructure
- Line number: M11
- Locale: Istanbul, Turkey
- Termini: Gayrettepe; Halkalı
- Stations: 16 (1 reserved)

Service
- Type: Rapid transit
- System: Istanbul Metro
- Services: 1
- Operator: TCDD Transport
- Depot: Taşoluk
- Rolling stock: 176 CRRC Zhuzhou

History
- Opened: 22 January 2023 (3 years ago)
- Last extension: 20 June 2026 (3 months ago)

Technical
- Line length: 69 km (43 mi)
- Number of tracks: 2
- Character: Airport express, underground
- Track gauge: 1,435 mm (4 ft 8 1/2 in) standard gauge
- Loading gauge: UIC standard gauge
- Minimum radius: 200 metres (660 ft)
- Electrification: Overhead line, 1,500 V DC
- Operating speed: 120 km/h (75 mph)

Line M11, officially referred to as the M11 Gayrettepe–Istanbul Airport–Halkalı Metro Line (Turkish: Gayrettepe–İstanbul Havalimanı–Halkalı Metro Hattı), is a line of the Istanbul Metro. It runs between Gayrettepe and Halkalı via Istanbul Airport. The line is 69 km (43 mi) long, making it the longest line in the Istanbul Metro. It is entirely underground, making it the second longest continuous subway tunnel in the world, and the longest in Europe. It is also the longest driverless metro line in the world.

The line used to be operated by a driver on board, before becoming fully automated and driverless on 3 January 2024.

== Route ==
M11 route diagram

Route of M11

The purpose of this line is to provide direct and quick access from Istanbul Airport in Arnavutköy to Levent, Istanbul's main commercial center and to Halkalı, one of the city's most important train stations. Unlike other metro lines, the M11 will be a limited stop service, meaning that stations will be spaced further apart. This is most noticeable towards the line's southern ends, where the M11 will only have seven stations within Istanbul's urban area: Halkalı, Halkalı Stadı, Olimpiyatköy, Kayaşehir and İbn Haldun Üniversitesi in the west and Gayrettepe and Kağıthane in the east.

It has two legs, one from Gayrettepe to Istanbul Airport line and the second from Halkalı to Istanbul Airport line. The first leg of the rapid transit line is 37.5 km (23.3 mi) long with nine stations. The second leg of the line is 31.5 km (19.6 mi) long with seven stations, in a total of 69 km (42.9 mi) with sixteen stations. The line is the longest continuous subway tunnel in the world. The travel time between the end stations is around 60 minutes at a maximum speed of 120 km/h (75 mph). The line runs through six districts of Istanbul, Şişli, Kağıthane, Eyüpsultan, Arnavutköy, Başakşehir and Küçükçekmece. It is expected that the line will carry annually around 94 million passengers. The M11 line connects to other rapid transit lines: Marmaray, M1, M2, M3, M7 (twice), M9, and at the airport to the high-speed train line.

== Construction ==
The investment budget of the construction is €999.8 million. The Turkish construction consortium Kolin-Şenbay won the tender for the building of the metro line in December 2016. The line was not scheduled to be completed before the airport's official 29 October 2018 airport opening. The line was constructed in four sections:

- Kağıthane–Istanbul Airport, opened on 22 January 2023
- Gayrettepe–Kağıthane, opened on 29 January 2024
- Arnavutköy Hastane–Istanbul Airport, opened on 19 March 2024
- Halkalı–Arnavutköy Hastane, tunnel construction completed in October 2025, opening ceremony held on 19 June 2026, officially opened on 20 June 2026

=== Opening timeline ===
Stage	Segment	Commencement	Length	Station(s)
1	Kağıthane – Istanbul Airport Cargo Terminal	22 January 2023	34.0 km (21.13 mi)	7
1	Gayrettepe – Kağıthane	29 January 2024	3.5 km (2.17 mi)	1
2	Istanbul Airport Cargo Terminal – Arnavutköy Hastane	19 March 2024	14.0 km (8.70 mi)	2
2	Arnavutköy Hastane – Halkalı	20 June 2026	17.5 km (10.87 mi)	5

== Rolling stock ==
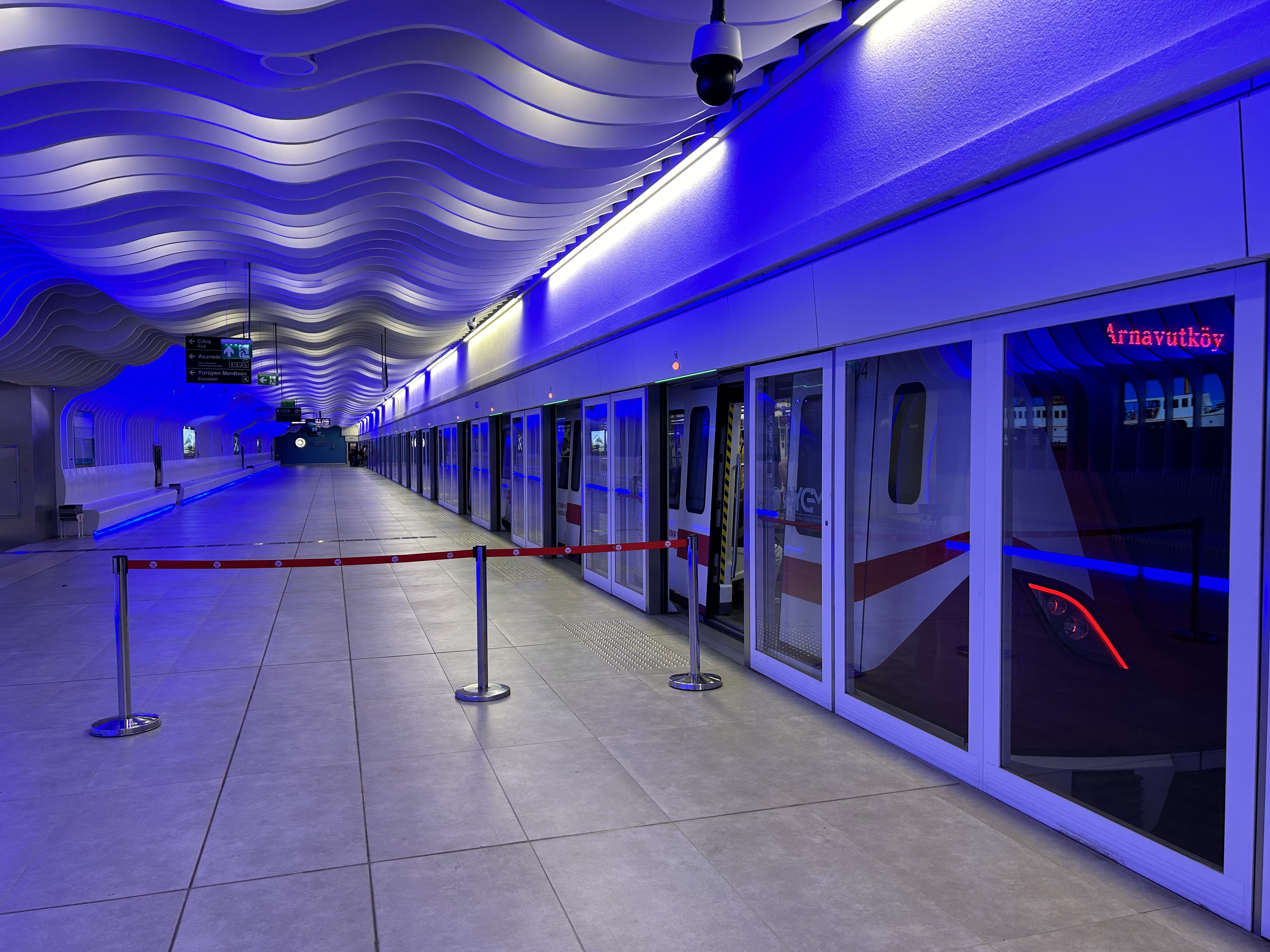
M11 train

The rolling stock was manufactured by CRRC Zhuzhou Locomotive, and was the first 120 km/h (75 mph) class automated metro train exported by China. 176 metro cars were supplied for the Line 11. The contract was awarded in January 2020, and the production of the first train was completed six months later, although these ten sets were not automated. The first train was delivered on September 6, 2020. On 3 January 2024, the Minister of Transport and Infrastructure, Abdulkadir Uraloğlu announced that 15 automated trainsets were ready to enter into use.

== Stations ==
The M11 has sixteen stations. Out of these sixteen, only eight are within the Istanbul metropolitan area.

No	Station	District	Transfer	Type	Notes
1	Gayrettepe	Şişli & Beşiktaş	・ (Zincirlikuyu); İETT Bus: 25G, 27E, 27SE, 27T, 29, 29A, 29C, 29D, 29İ, 29P, 29Ş, 30A, 30M, 36L, 40B, 41AT, 41E, 42, 42M, 42Z, 43R, 50Z, 58A, 58N, 58S, 58UL, 59A, 59B, 59CH, 59K, 59N, 59R, 59S, 59UÇ, 62, 62G, 63, 64Ç, 65G, 121A, 121B, 121BS, 122B, 122C, 122D, 122Y, 251, 252, 256, 522, 522B, 522ST, 599C, 622, DT1, DT2, U1, U2	Underground	Zincirlikuyu Cemetery・Büyükdere Avenue・Zorlu Center・ Zincirlikuyu İETT Platforms
2	Kağıthane	Kâğıthane	・ (planned); İETT Bus: 41ST, 46Ç, 46T, 48, 48H, 48N, 48T, 50D, 62, 63, 64Ç, 65A, 65G, K1, K2, K3, K4, TM3	Underground	Kağıthane Creek・Kağıthane İETT Platforms
3	Hasdal	Eyüpsultan	İETT Bus: 48, 50G, H-2, TM4	Underground	D.020・(New) Istanbul University (Çapa) Medical Faculty Hospital・Hasdal Barracks
4	Kemerburgaz	Eyüpsultan	İETT Bus: 48, 48C, 48D, 48G, 48K, 48KA, 48L, 48P, 48R, 50G, TM4	Underground	Kasımpaşa SK Kemerburgaz Facilities・Kemerburgaz City Forest・Consulate General of Turkmenistan
5	Göktürk	Eyüpsultan	İETT Bus: 48K, 48KA, 48P, D2 (open only on summer)	Underground	Istanbul Regional Directorate of Forestry Göktürk Nursery
6	İhsaniye	Eyüpsultan	İETT Bus: 48KA, 48M, 48P	Underground	İBB Biomethanization Facility
7	~~Terminal 2~~	Arnavutköy	(İstanbul Airport)・ (İstanbul Airport High Speed Train Terminal); İETT Bus: H-1, H-2, H-3, H-6, H-7, H-8, H-9	Underground	Station Not In Operation - Passing
8	İstanbul Havalimanı (Airport)	Arnavutköy	(İstanbul Airport)・ (İstanbul Airport High Speed Train Terminal); İETT Bus: H-1, H-2, H-3, H-6, H-7, H-8, H-9	Underground	Istanbul Airport・Ali Kuşçu Mosque
9	Kargo Terminali (Cargo Terminal)	Arnavutköy	(İstanbul Airport)・ (İstanbul Airport High Speed Train Terminal); İETT Bus: H-1, H-2, H-3, H-6, H-7, H-8, H-9	Underground	Istanbul Airport・THY Cargo IGA Facilities
10	Taşoluk	Arnavutköy	İETT Bus: 36AS, 36D, 36HT, 36YS, 336A, 336G, 336H, 336T, H-6	Underground	Depot・Ministry of Forestry Plantation Site
11	Arnavutköy Hastane	Arnavutköy	İETT Bus: 36AS, 36AY, 36B, 36CB, 36D, 36HT, 36TC, 36Y, 36YS, 48KA, 48M, 336, 336A, 336G, 336H, 336K, 336M, 336MC, 336T, ARN1, H-6, MK22	Underground	Arnavutköy State Hospital・Arnavutköy City Park・Arnavutköy İETT Platforms
12	İbn Haldun Üniversitesi	Başakşehir	İETT Bus: 36B, 36CB, 36F, 36HT, 36TC, 36Y, 78B, 78C, 78E, 78F, 78FB, 78G, 78H, 78ZB, 78Ş, 79C, 79F, 79FY, 79GE, 79KM, 79KT, 79M, 98, 98KM, 146BA, 146F, 146K, 336, 336A, 336G, 336H, 336K, 336M, 336MC, 336T, H-6, MK31	Underground	Ibn Haldun University Main Campus・Fenertepe İETT Platforms
13	Kayaşehir	Başakşehir	(Kayaşehir Merkez); İETT Bus: 36F, 78E, 78F, 79F, 79FY, 79GE, 79KM, 79KT, 79M, 146BA, 146F, MK1, MK22	Underground	Başakşehir National Garden
14	Olimpiyatköy	Başakşehir	(Olimpiyat); İETT Bus: 36AS, 36AY, 36F, 76A, 79FY, 79K, 79Ş, 142E, 144M, 146A, 146T, HS1, MK2, MK11, MK12, MK13, MK14, MK15, MK16	Underground	Atatürk Olympic Stadium・Olimpiyatköy İETT Platforms
15	Halkalı Stadı	Küçükçekmece	(Atakent Mahallesi, under construction); İETT Bus: 76V, 78G, 78Ş, 89A, 89K, 98S, 141M, 89YB, HT1, HT2, KÇ2, MK31, MR40, MR50, MR51	Underground	İBB Halkalı Football Stadium Sports Facilities・İstanbul Tema Hospital・Tema World Mall
16	Halkalı	Küçükçekmece	(Halkalı)・ (planned); İETT Bus: 79Y, 89A, 143, BN1, H-3, MR40, MR42, MR50, MR51	Underground	TCDD Lodgings・Halkalı Customs Directorate・Halkalı Marmaray İETT Platforms
