= Halkalı metro station =

Station of the Istanbul Metro

Halkalı
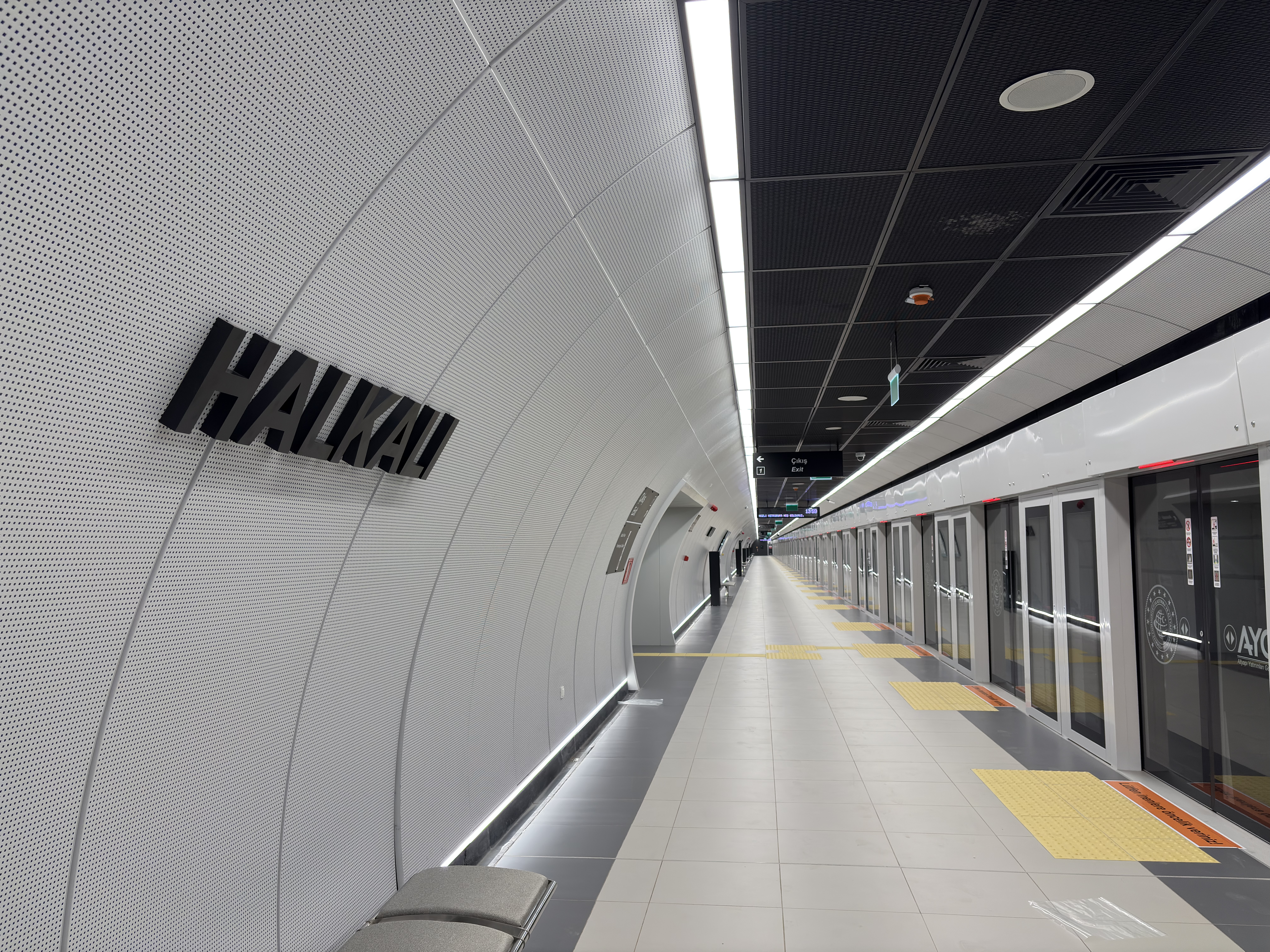
- Platform

General information
- Location: İstasyon Neighborhood, Station Street, 34303; Küçükçekmece, Istanbul; Turkey
- Coordinates: 41°1′11″N 28°46′5″E
- System: Istanbul Metro rapid transit station
- Owner: Ministry of Transport and Infrastructure
- Operator: TCDD Transport
- Line: M11
- Platforms: 1 Island platform
- Tracks: 2
- Connections: TCDD Transport: Marmaray, B2 suburban, YHT and TCDD Transport at Halkalı; İETT Bus: Halkalı Marmaray: 79Y, 89A, 143, BN1, H-3, MR40, MR42, MR50, MR51; Istanbul Minibus: K.S.S Hastanesi–Cennet Metrobüs, Deprem Konutları–Küçükçekmece, Küçükçekmece–Kayaşehir

Construction
- Structure type: Underground
- Parking: Yes
- Cycle facilities: Yes
- Accessible: Yes

History
- Opened: 20 June 2026 (2 months ago)
- Electrified: 1,500 V DC Overhead line

Services
Preceding station	Istanbul Metro	Following station
Terminus	M11 Line	Halkalı Stadı towards Gayrettepe
Future services
Preceding station	Istanbul Metro	Following station
Terminus	M1b Line	Bezirganbahçe towards Yenikapı
Location

Halkalı is an underground station on the M11 line of the Istanbul Metro and its western terminus. It is located under Station Street in the İstasyon neighborhood of Küçükçekmece. It was opened on 20 June 2026, allowing passengers to go from Halkalı to Istanbul Airport in 35 minutes. Connection to trans-Bosporus Marmaray commuter rail service, B2 suburban, the YHT and regional TCDD Transport lines is available from Halkalı railway station as well as IETT city buses.

The station is expected to become an interchange with the M1B line in the future.

== Layout ==
	No passenger service
Island platform, doors will open on the right
Northbound	toward Gayrettepe - Istanbul Airport (Halkalı Stadı) →

== Operation information ==
The line operates between 06:00 and 00:40 and train frequency is 20 minutes. The line has no night service.

== Nearby places of interest ==
- Halkalı Customs Directorate
- TCDD Customs Warehouses
- TCDD Lodgings
- ÇNAEM (Çekmece Nuclear Research and Training Center)
- Atatürk Park

== Gallery ==
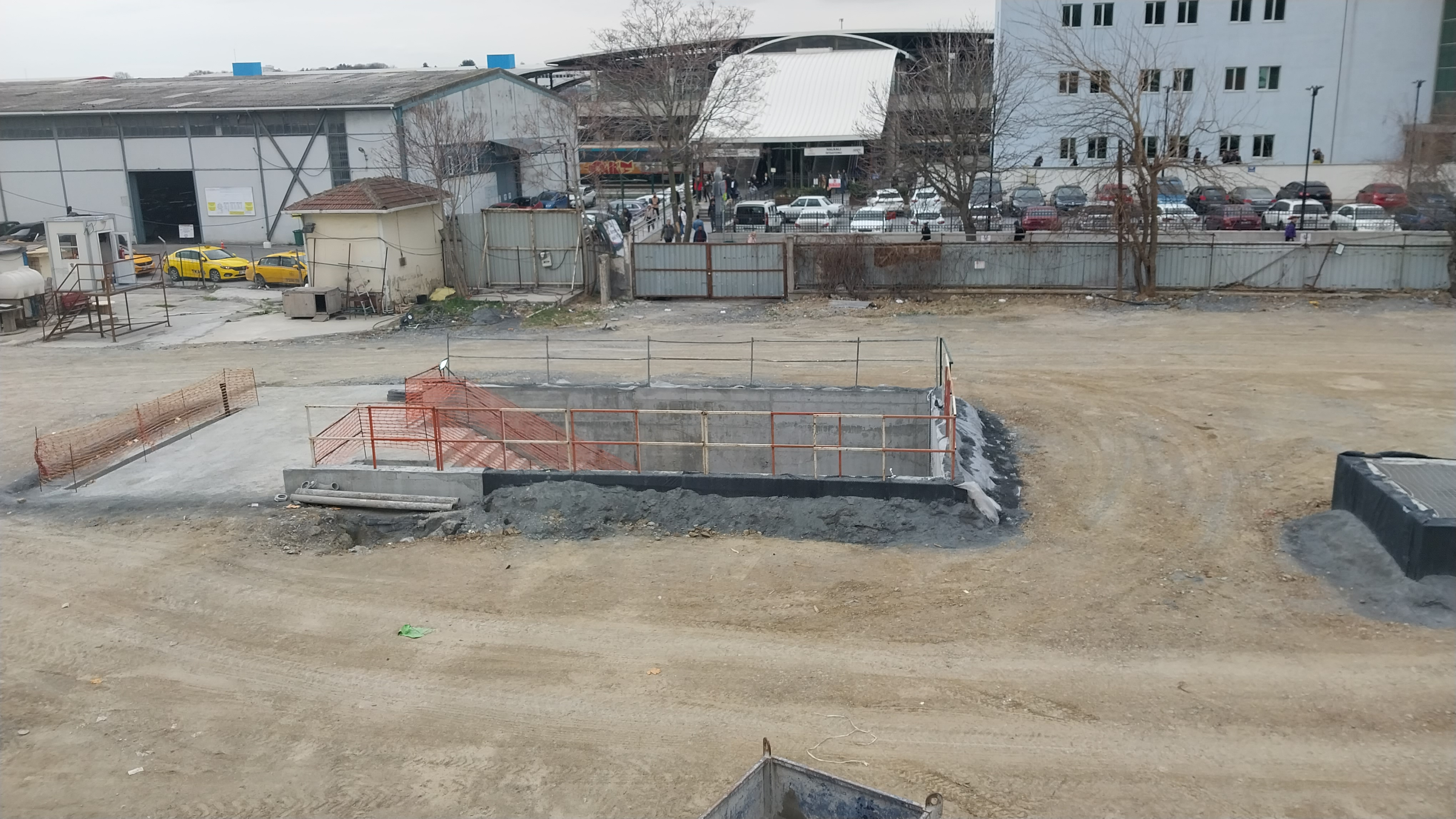
Under construction, March 2023

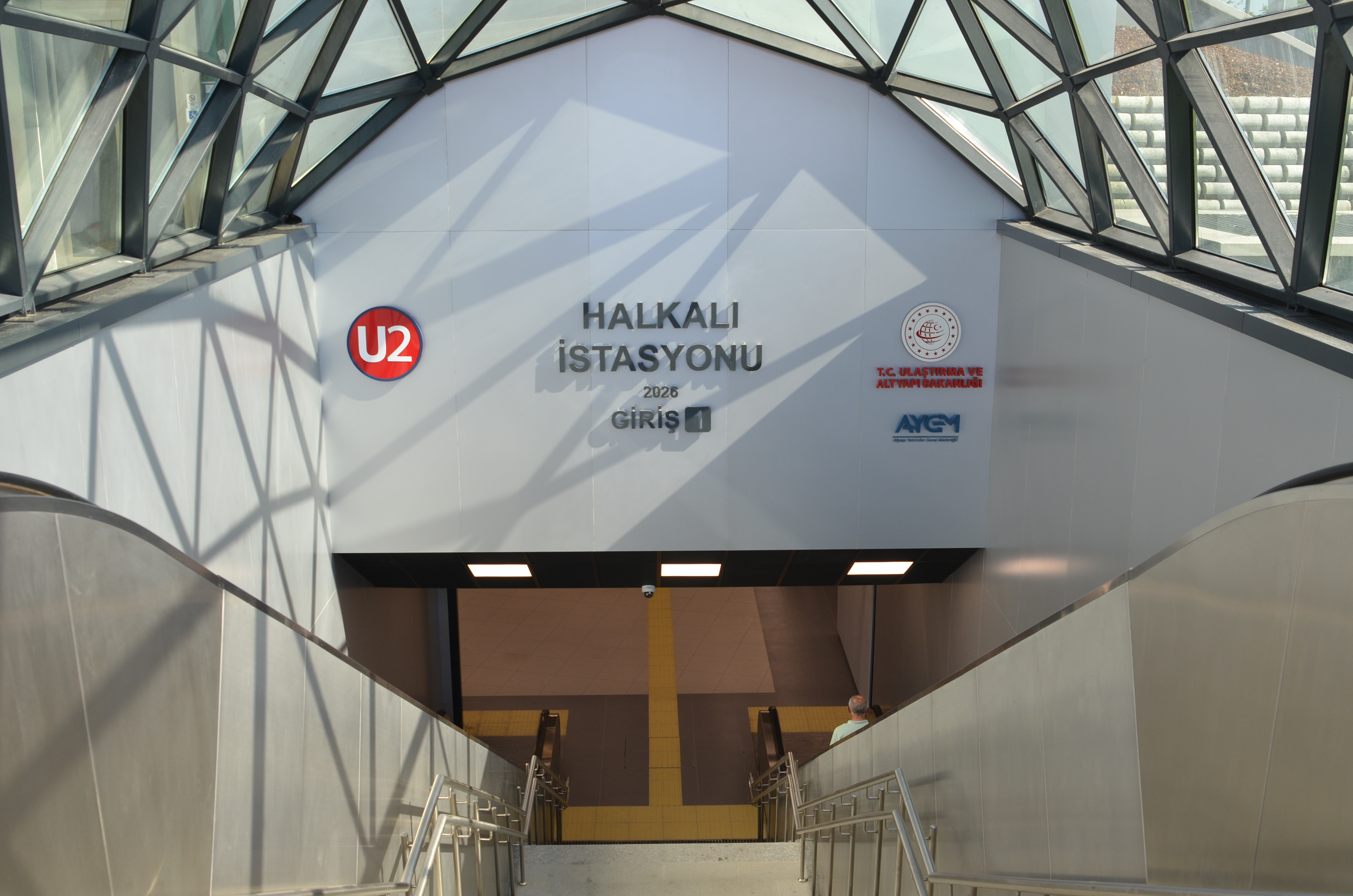
Entrance 1

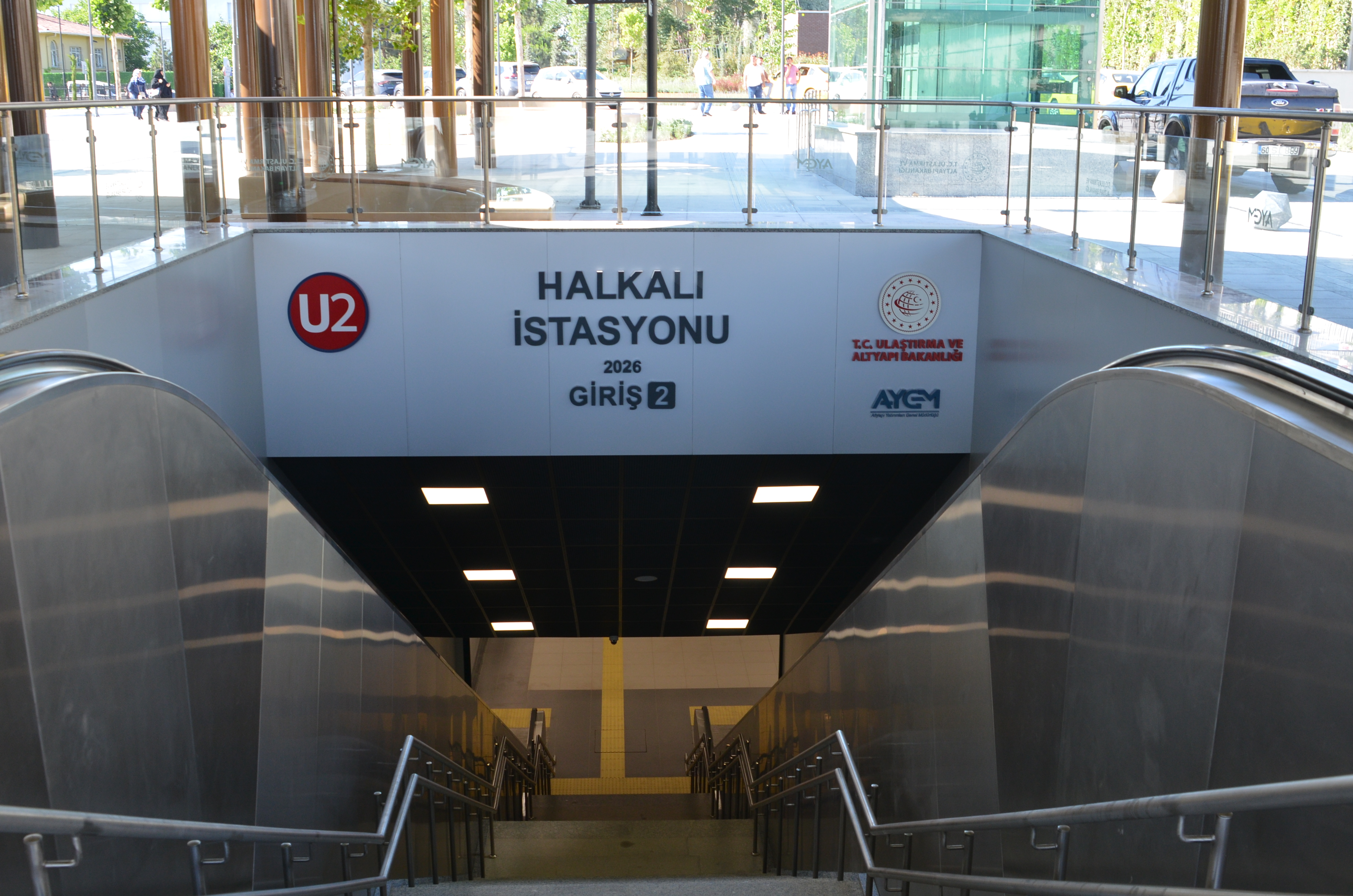
Entrance 2

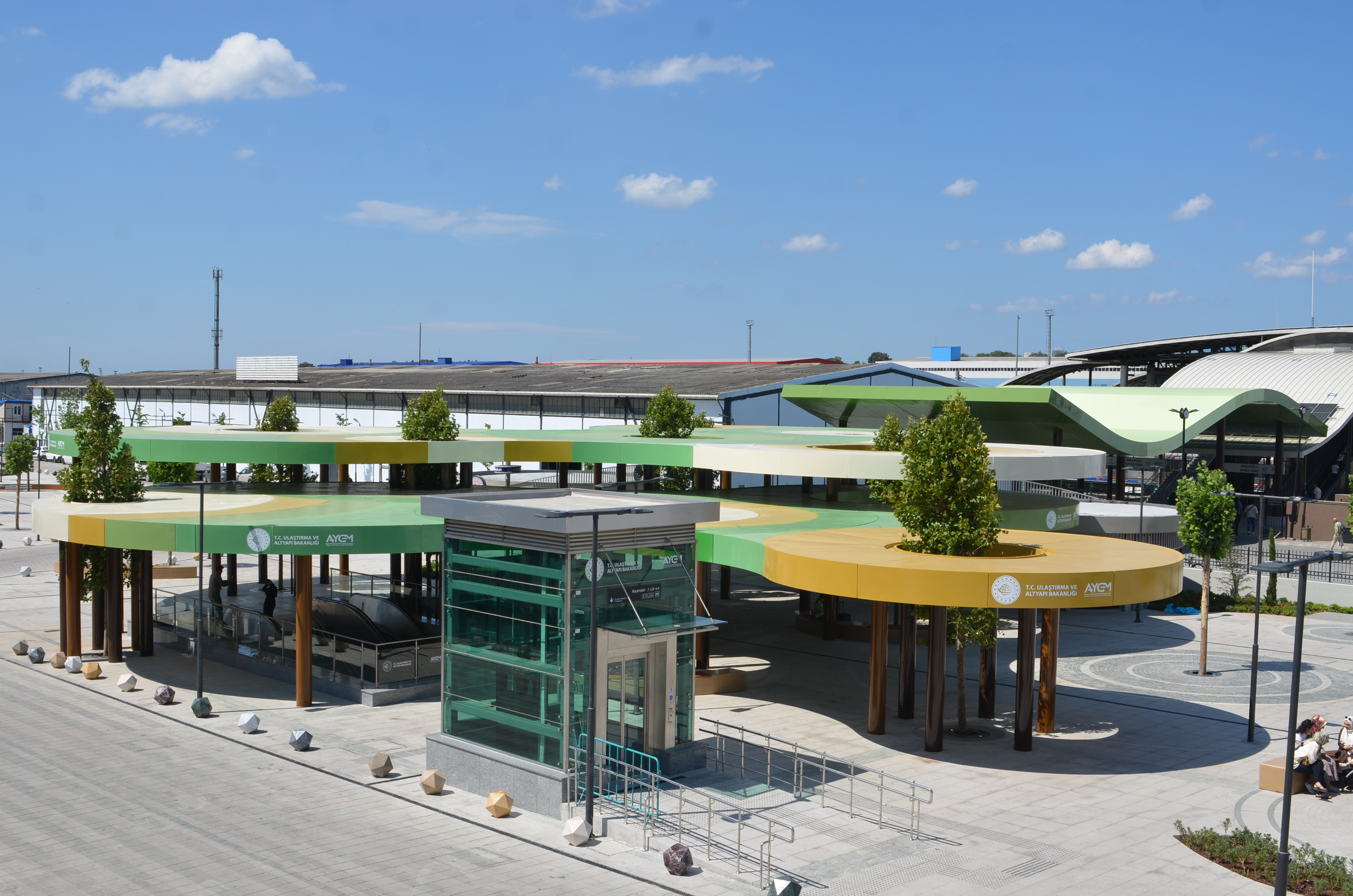
Station square

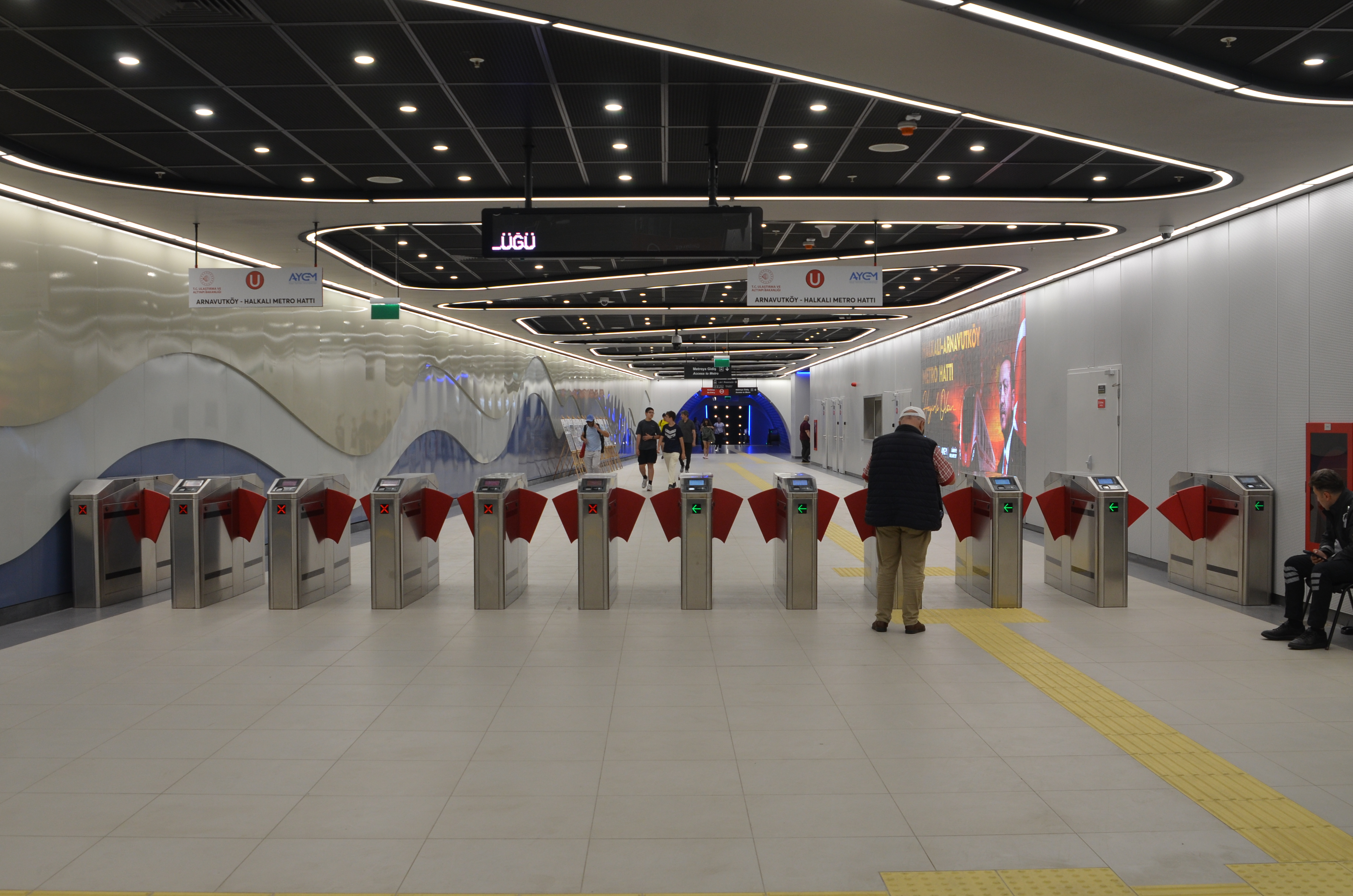
Ticket hall

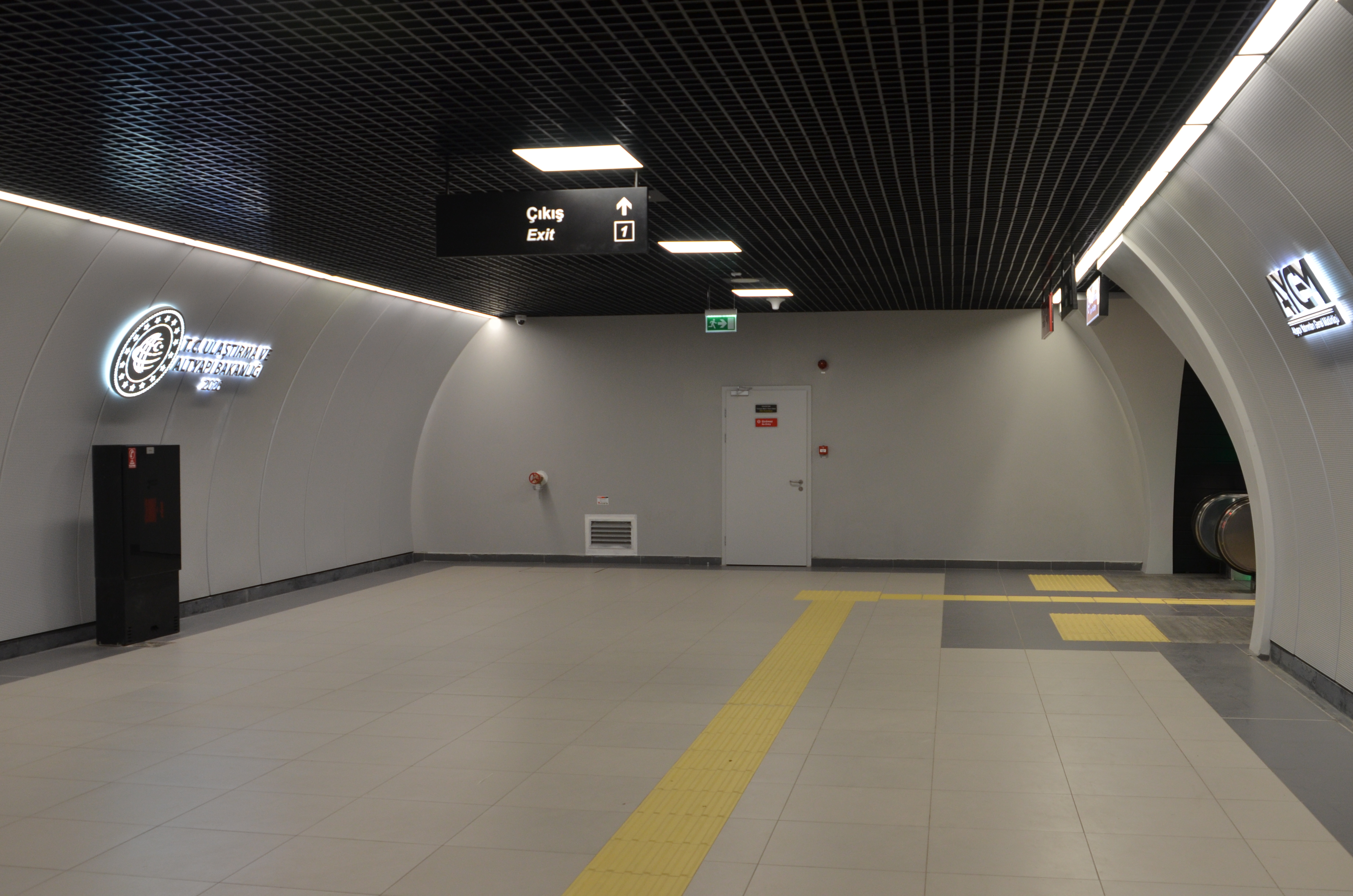
Mezzanine

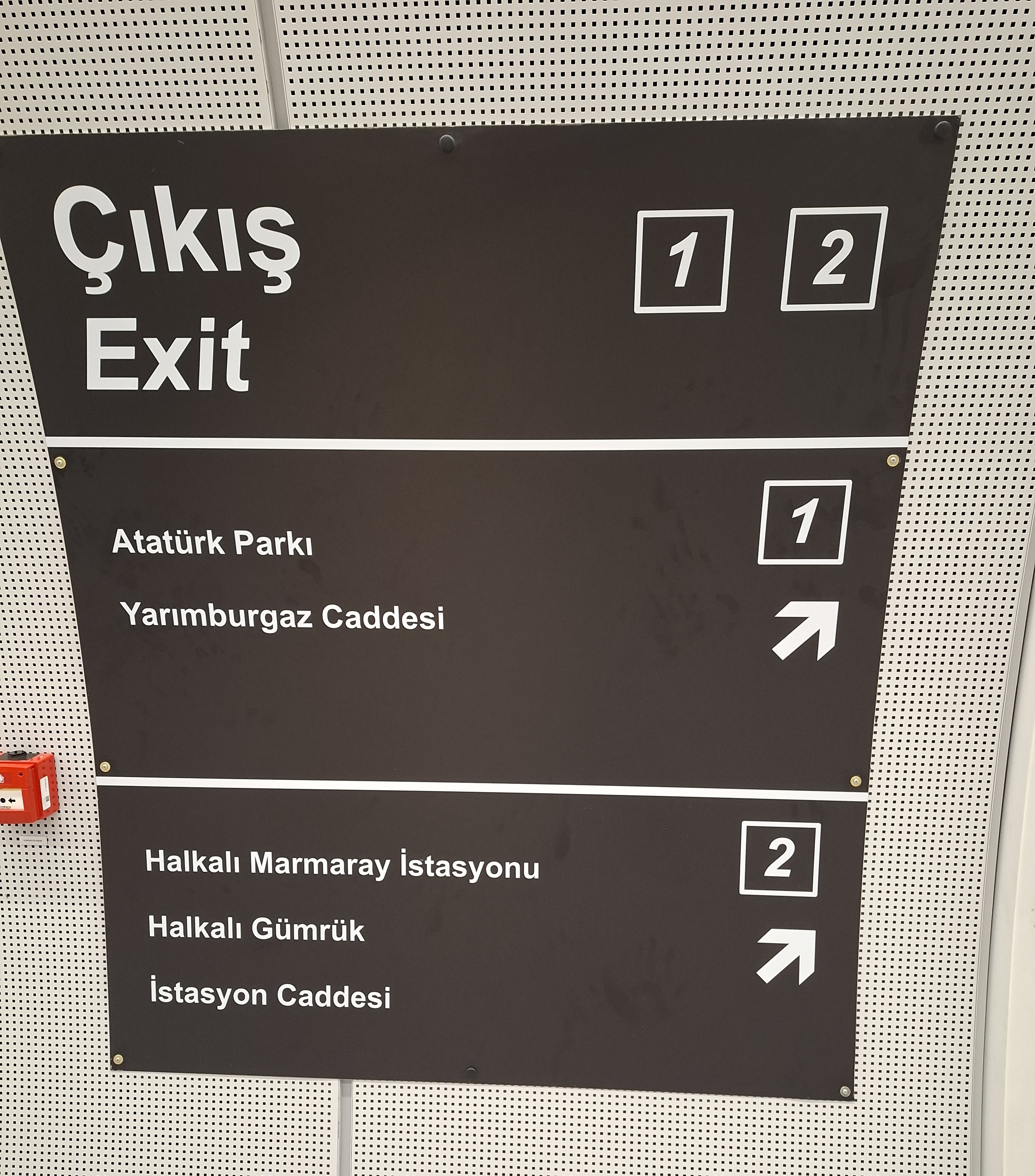
Exit sign

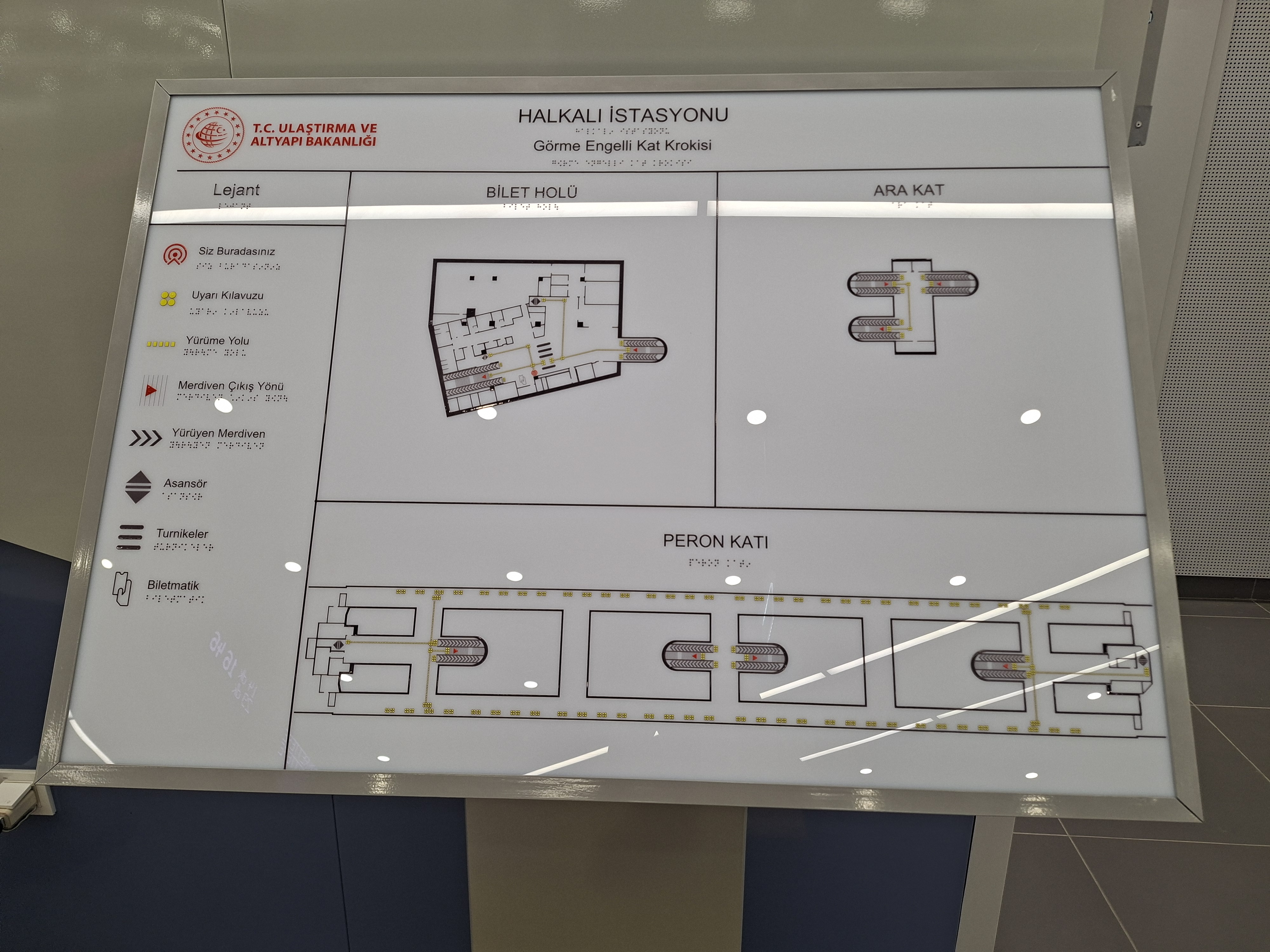
Station diagram (Entrance 1)

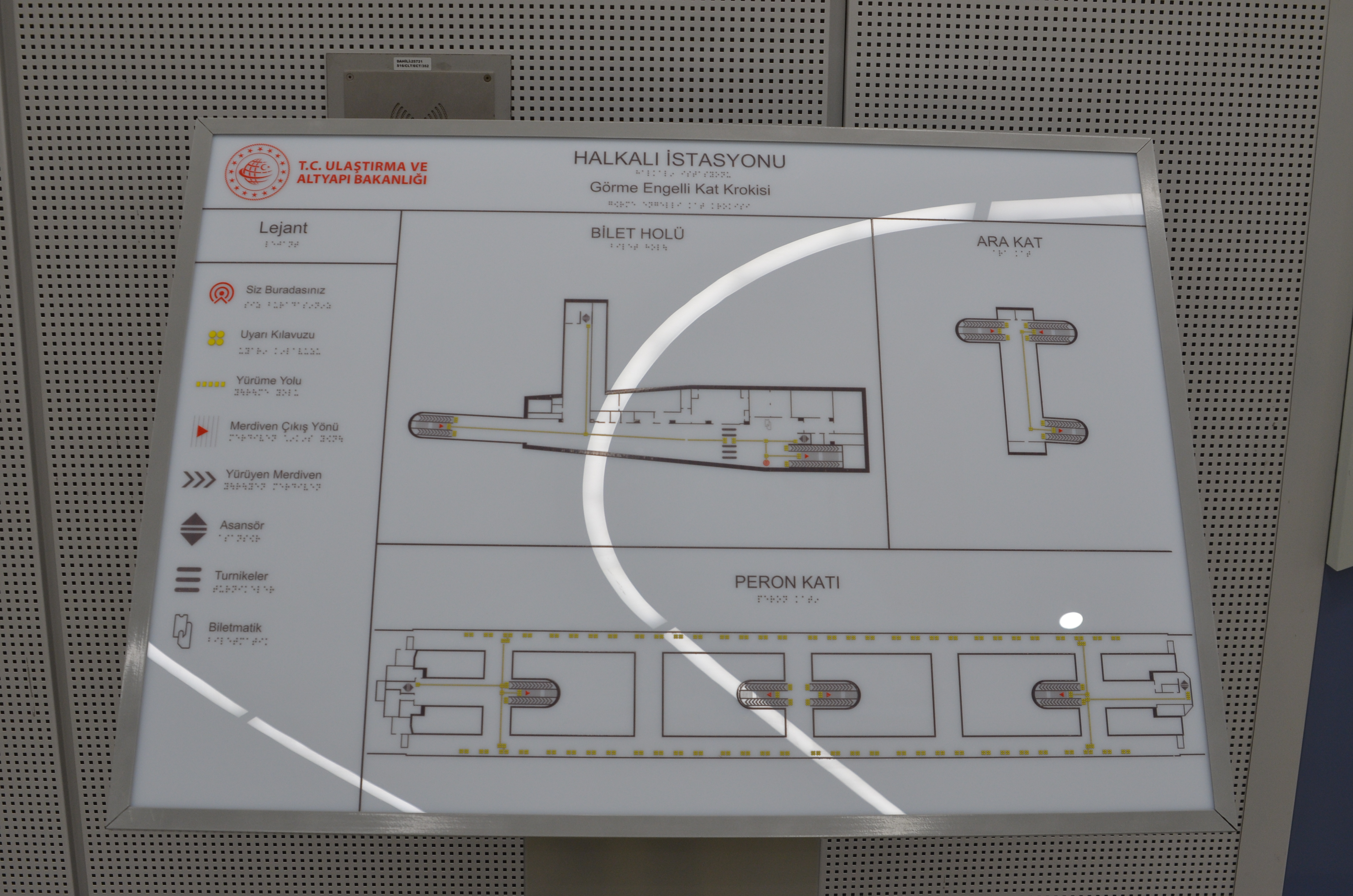
Station diagram (Entrance 2)

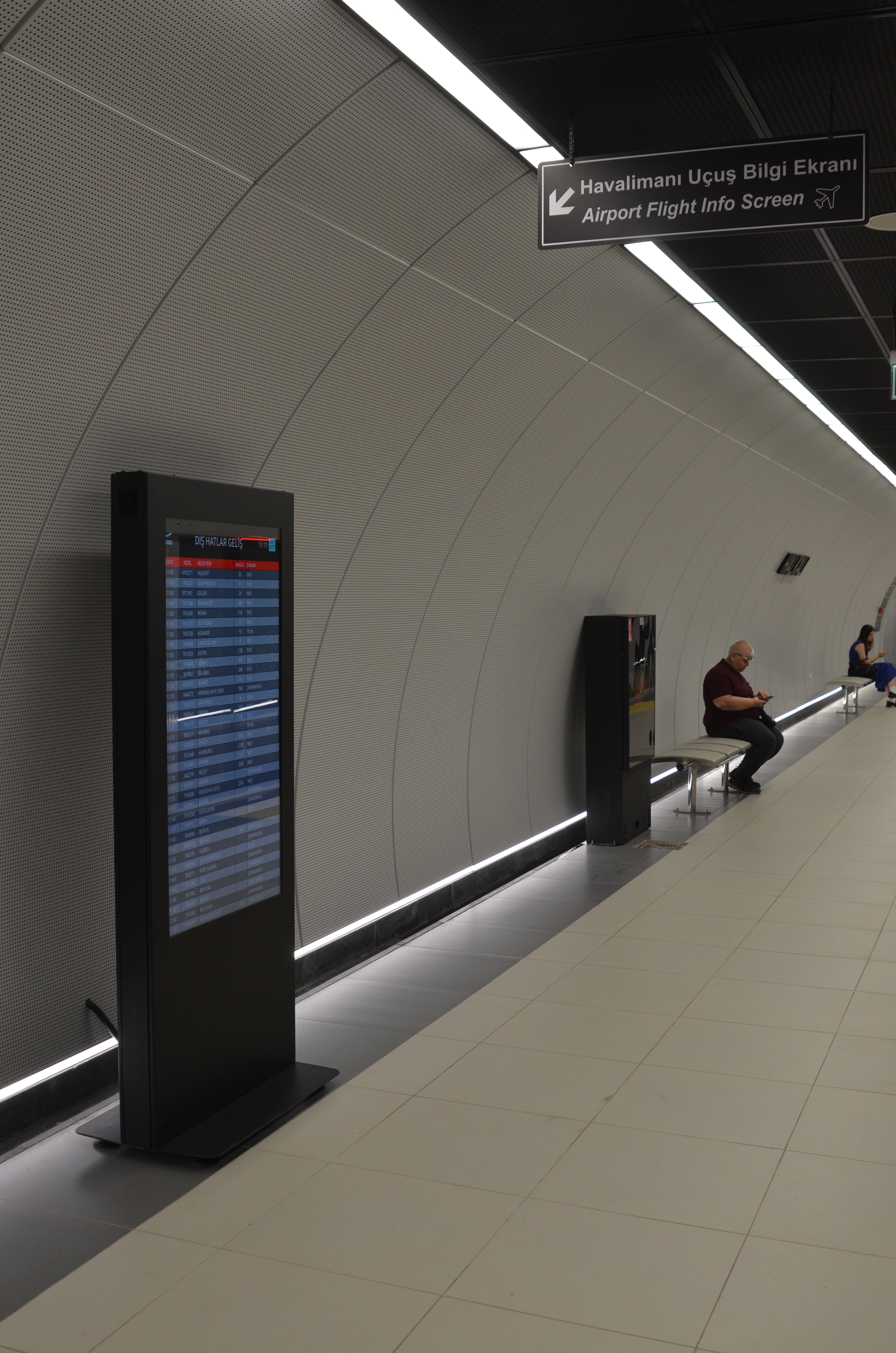
Flight information display on the platform

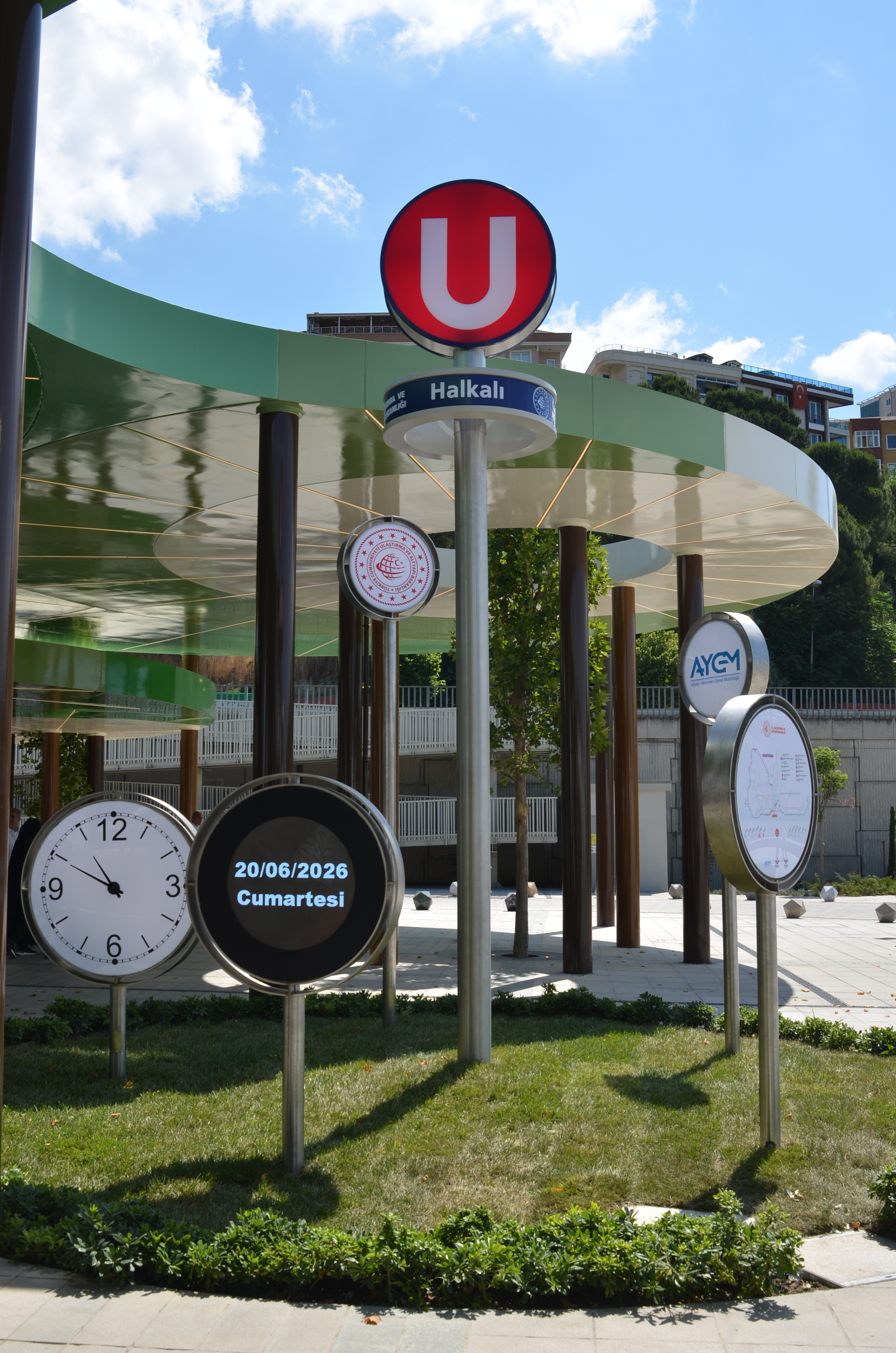
Totem pole

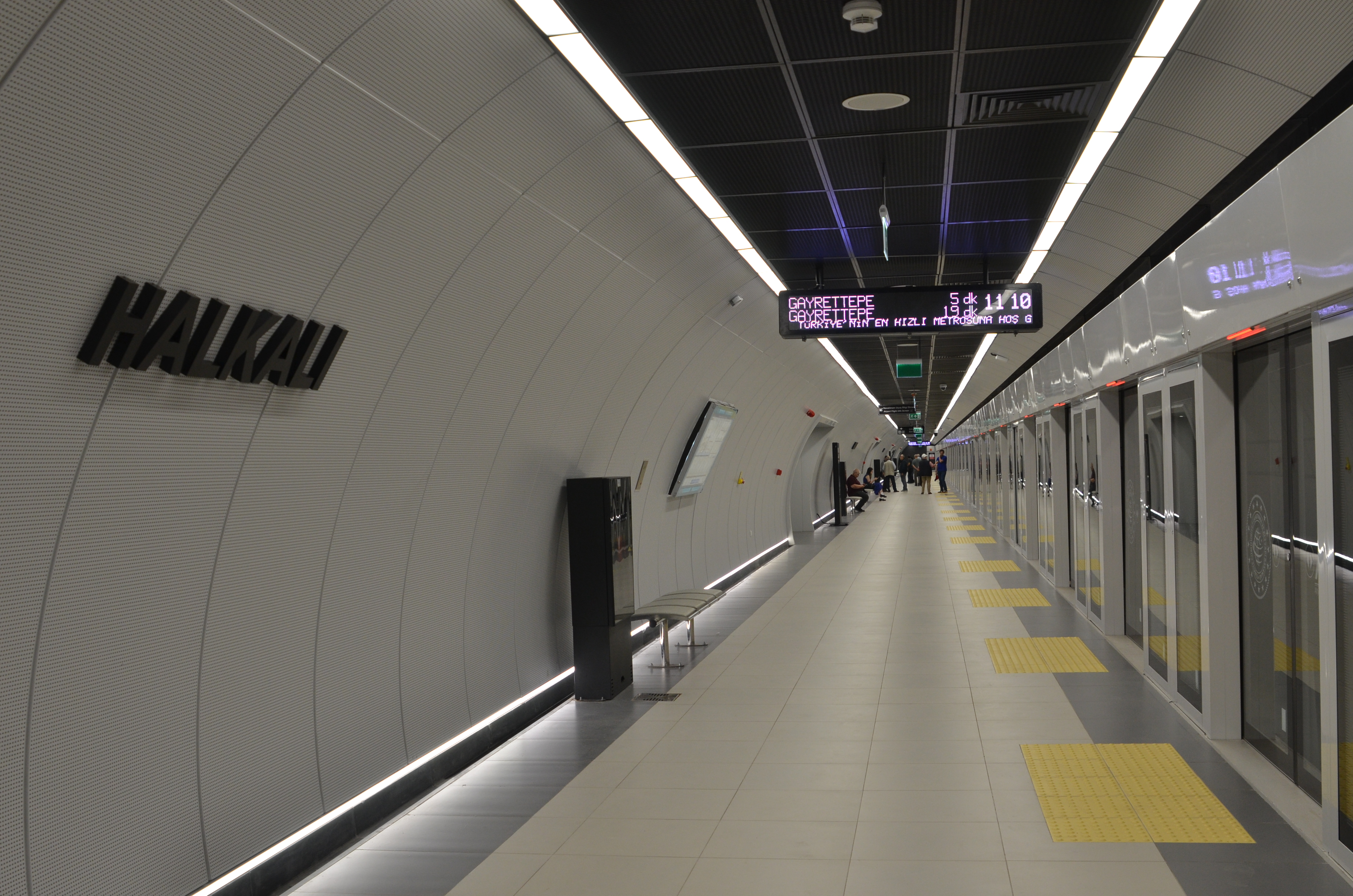
Platform
