= Gayrettepe station =

Station of the Istanbul Metro

Gayrettepe (M2) Gayrettepe (M11)
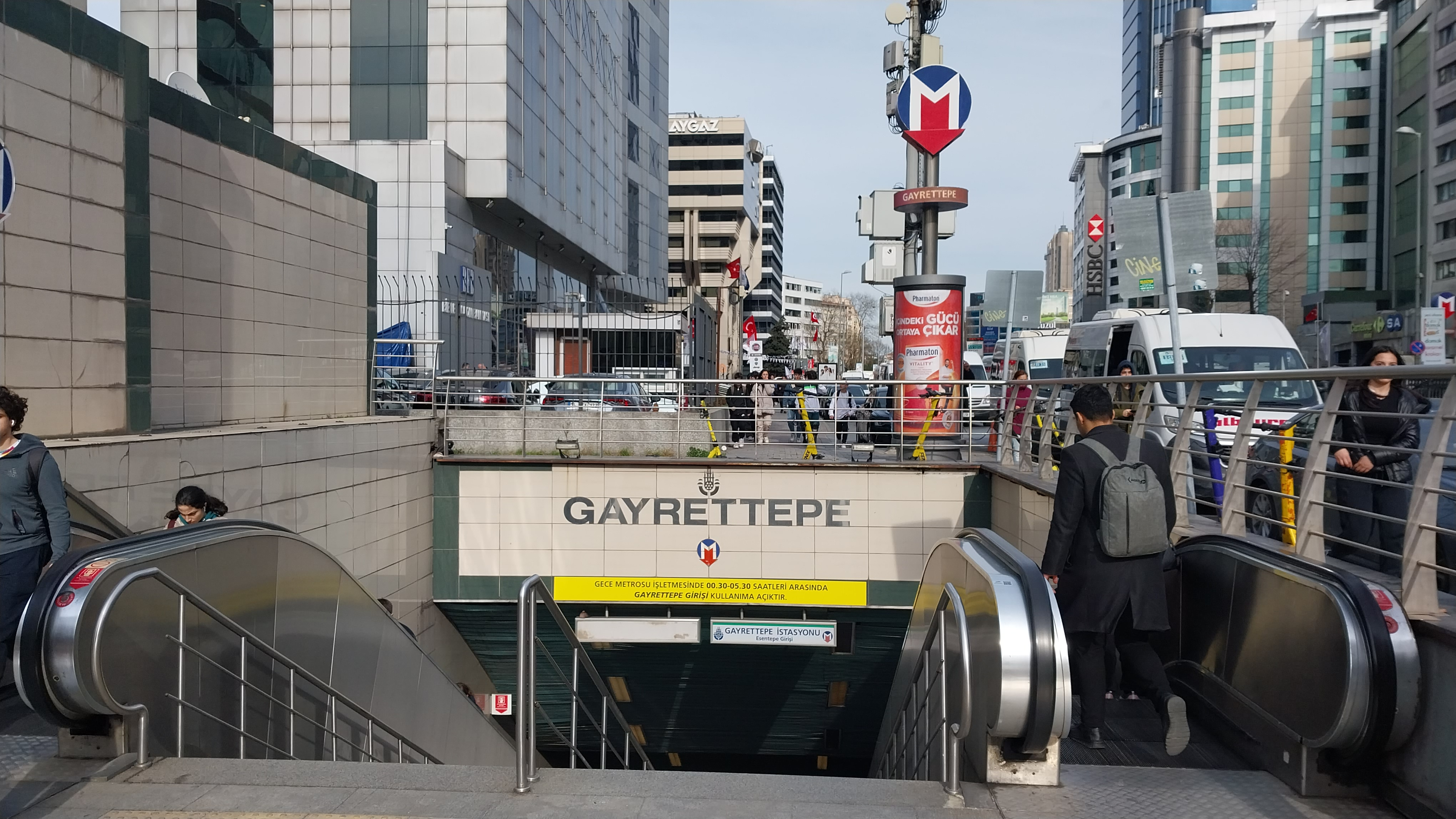
- M2 entrance in 2023

General information
- Coordinates: 41.069165°N 29.010928°E
- Owner: Istanbul Metro (M2); TCDD Transport (M11)
- Lines: M2; M11
- Platforms: 2 island platforms (1 per line)
- Tracks: 4 (2 per line)
- Connections: Metrobus: 34, 34A, 34G, 34Z, 34AS, 34BZ at Zincirlikuyu; İETT Bus: 25G, 27E, 27SE, 27T, 29, 29A, 29C, 29D, 29İ, 29P, 29Ş, 30A, 30M, 36G, 36L, 39Z, 40B, 41AT, 41E, 42, 42M, 42Z, 43R, 50Z, 58A, 58N, 58S, 58UL, 59A, 59B, 59CH, 59K, 59N, 59R, 59S, 59UÇ, 64Ç, 65G, 121A, 121B, 121BS, 122B, 122C, 122D, 122M, 122Y, 202, 251, 252, 256, 500A, 522, 522ST, 599C, 622, DT1, DT2, U1, U2; Istanbul Minibus: Beşiktaş-Sarıyer, Beşiktaş-Tarabya, Zincirlikuyu-Ayazağa, Zincirlikuyu-Bahçeköy, Zincirlikuyu-Poligon Mahallesi, Zincirlikuyu-Pınar Mahallesi, Zincirlikuyu-Vadistanbul

Construction
- Structure type: Underground
- Accessible: Yes

History
- Opened: : 16 September 2000 (25 years ago) : 29 January 2024 (2 years ago)
- Electrified: 750V DC Third rail 1,500 V DC Overhead line

Services
| Preceding station | Istanbul Metro | Following station |
|---|---|---|
| Şişli–Mecidiyeköy towards Yenikapı | M2 Line | Levent towards Hacıosman |
| Kağıthane towards Halkalı | M11 Line | Terminus |
Location

Gayrettepe is an underground rapid transit interchange station between the M2 and M11 lines of the Istanbul Metro. It is located in east-central Şişli under Büyükdere Avenue just south of Levent. The M2 portion of the station opened on 16 September 2000 and is one of the original six stations of the M2 line. In 2007 a connection to the Istanbul Metrobus at Zincirlikuyu junction was built. On 29 January 2024, the Kağıthane–Gayrettepe portion of the M11 line opened, allowing passengers to go from Gayrettepe to Istanbul Airport in 30 minutes. With a depth of 72 meters, the M11 platform is the deepest station in the Istanbul Metro system.

== Layout ==
=== M2 Platform ===
| Southbound | ← toward Yenikapı (Şişli–Mecidiyeköy) |
Island platform, doors will open on the left
| Northbound | toward Hacıosman (Levent) → |

=== M11 Platform ===
| Northbound | ← toward Halkalı - Istanbul Airport (Kağıthane) |
Island platform, doors will open on the left
| Southbound | termination platform → |
