= İstanbul Havalimanı station =

Station of the Istanbul Metro

Istanbul Havalimanı (Istanbul Airport)
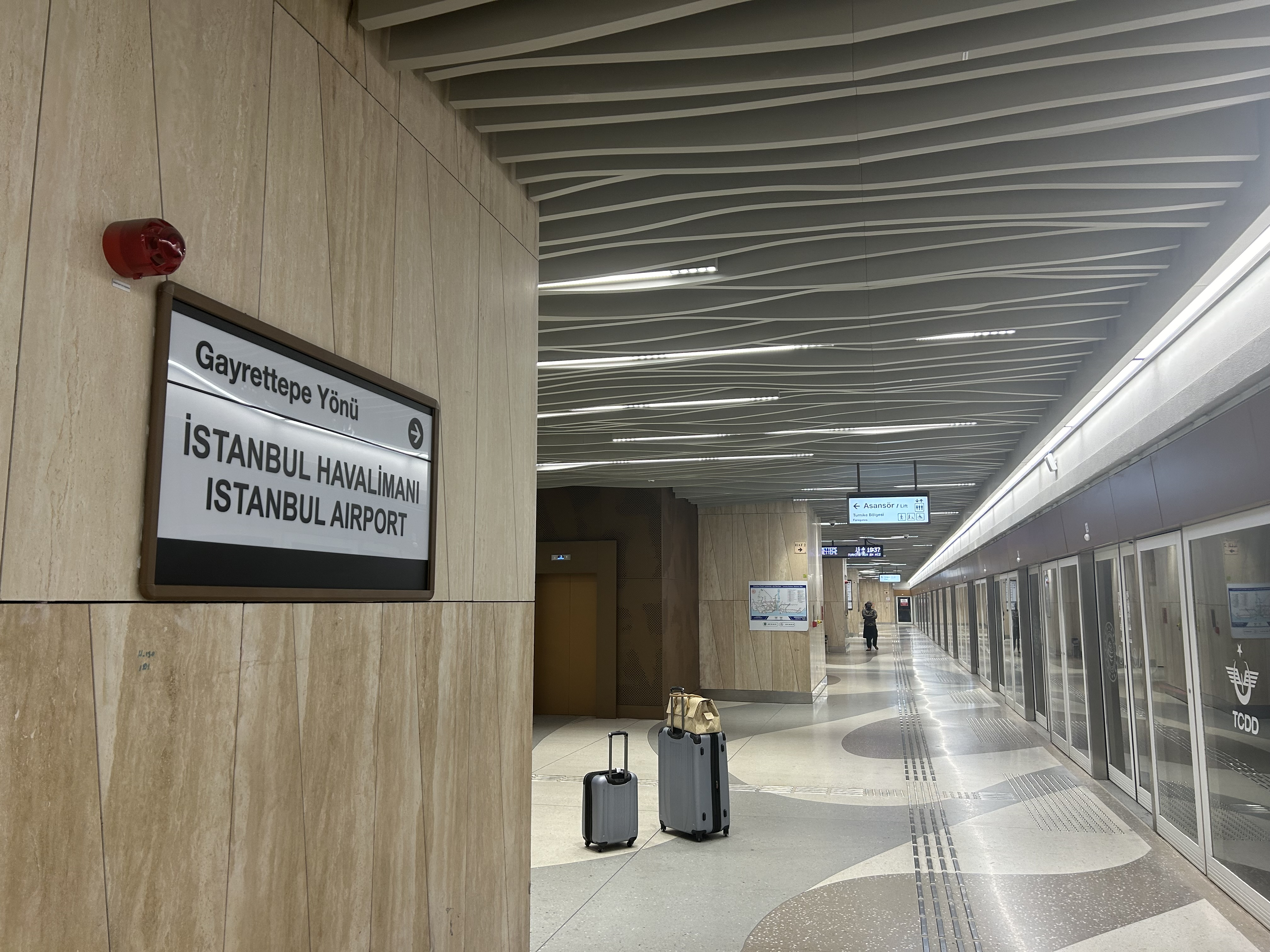
- Platform

General information
- Location: Tayakadın Neighborhood, Istanbul Airport, 34277; Arnavutköy, Istanbul; Turkey
- Coordinates: 41°15′22″N 28°44′33″E
- System: Istanbul Metro rapid transit station
- Owner: Ministry of Transport and Infrastructure
- Operator: TCDD Transport
- Line: M11
- Platforms: 1 Island platform
- Tracks: 2
- Connections: İETT Bus: H-1, H-2, H-3, H-6, H-7, H-8, H-9; Istanbul Airport

Construction
- Structure type: Underground
- Parking: Yes (paid airport parking)
- Cycle facilities: Yes
- Accessible: Yes

History
- Opened: 22 January 2023 (3 years ago)
- Electrified: 1,500 V DC Overhead line

Services
Preceding station	Istanbul Metro	Following station
Kargo Terminali towards Halkalı	M11 Line	İhsaniye towards Gayrettepe
Location

İstanbul Havalimanı (Istanbul Airport) is an underground rapid transit station on the M11 line of the Istanbul Metro. It is located in the Tayakadın neighbourhood of Arnavutköy district, serving Istanbul Airport. The station is among the first five metro stations to be located outside of the city (urban area) of Istanbul. It was opened on 22 January 2023.

== History ==
Construction of the station began in 2016, along with the entire route from Gayrettepe to the Istanbul Airport.

== Layout ==
Westbound	← toward Halkalı (Kargo Terminali)
Island platform, doors will open on the left
Eastbound	toward Gayrettepe (İhsaniye) →

== Operation information ==
The line operates between 06:00 and 00:40 and train frequency is 20 minutes. The line has no night service.

== Gallery ==
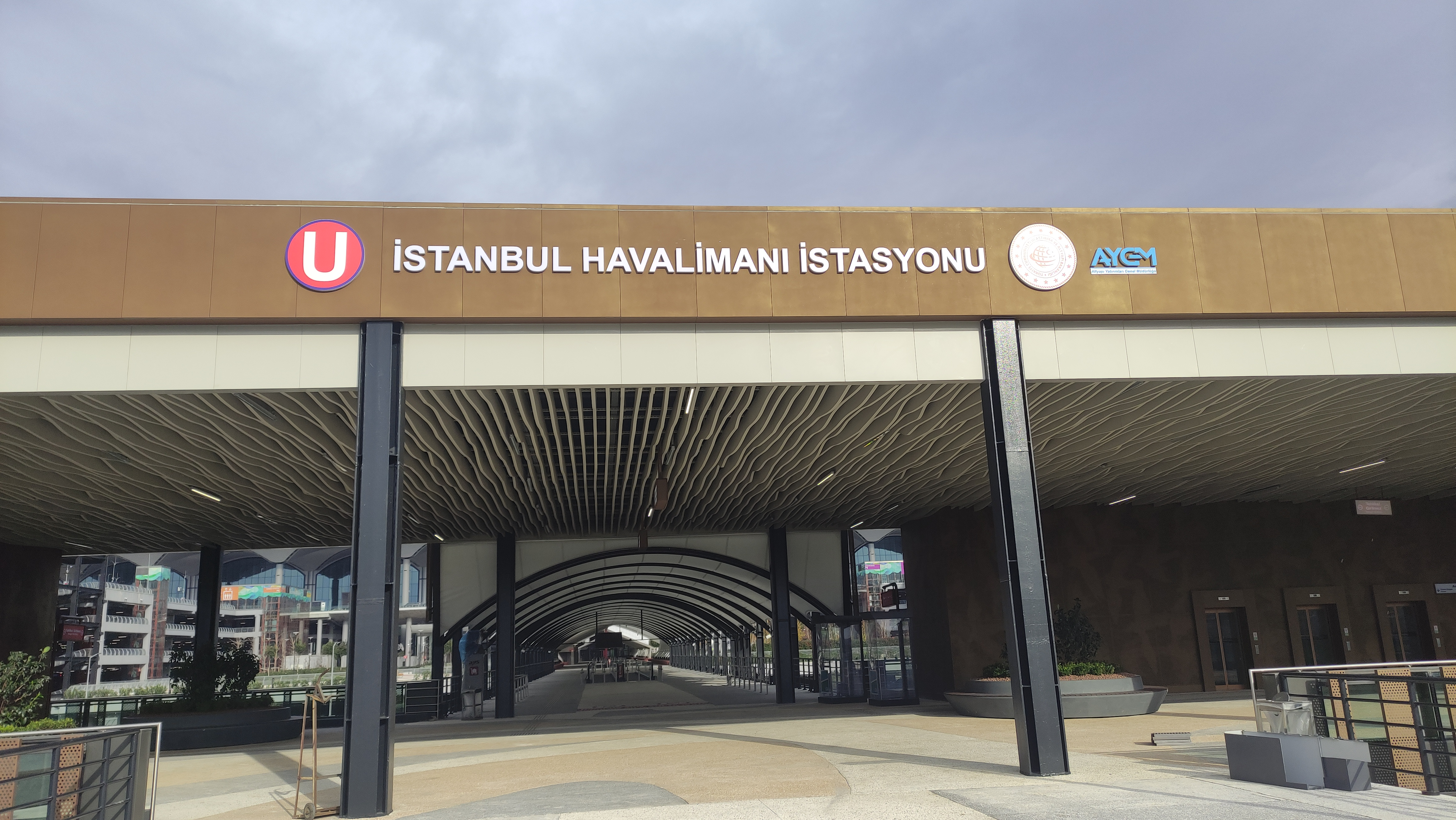
Main entrance

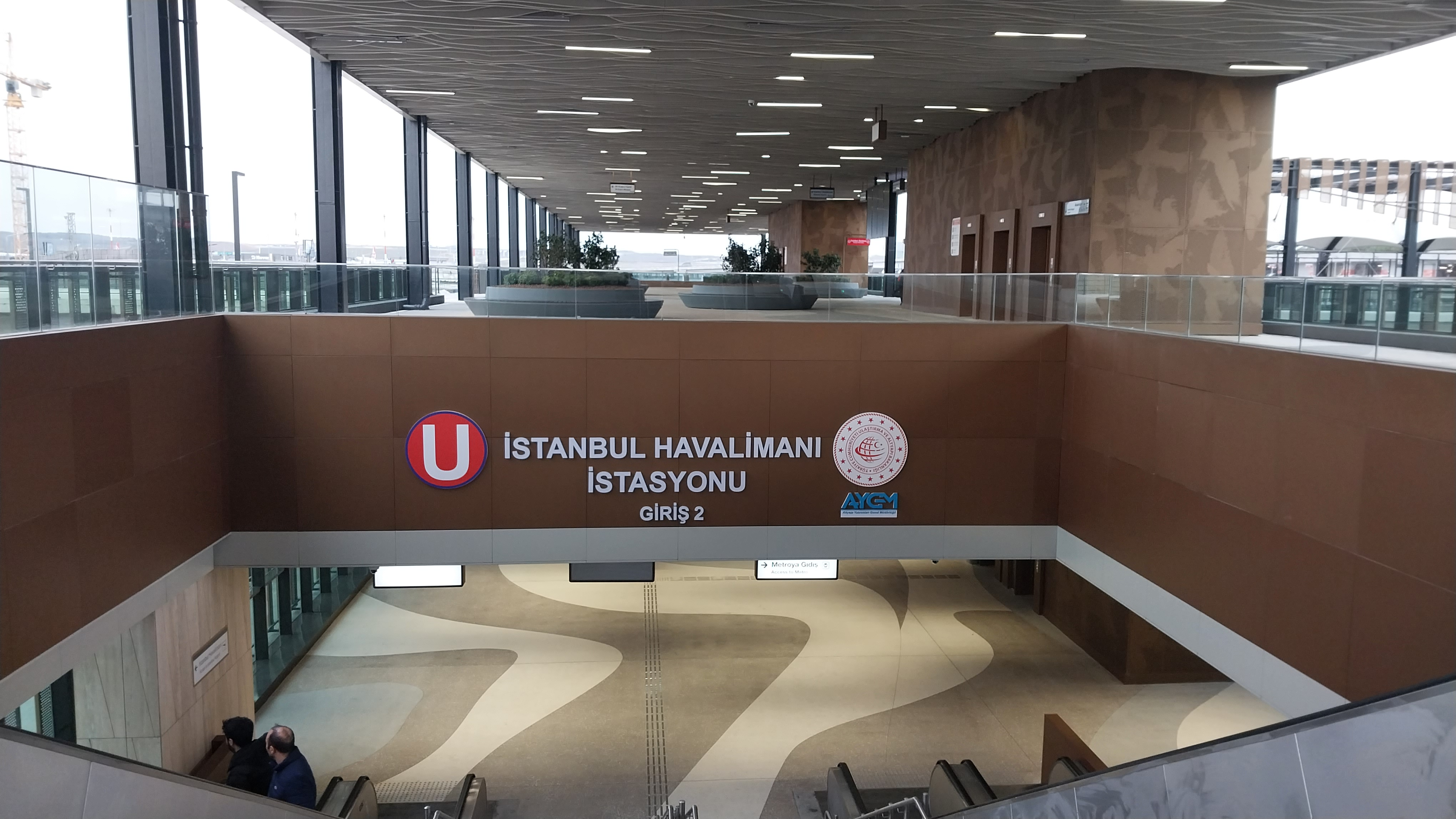
Entrance 2

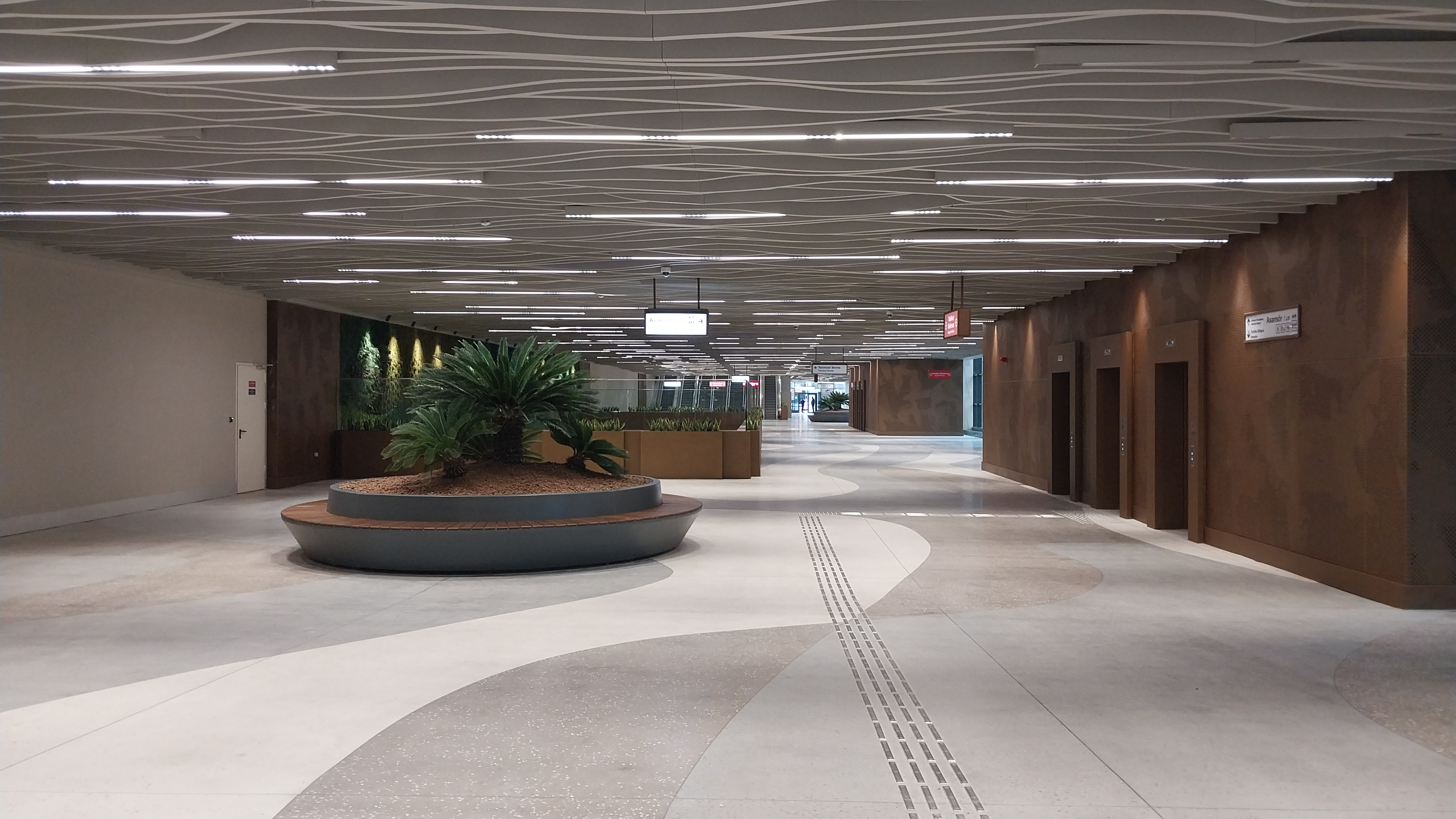
Entrance hall

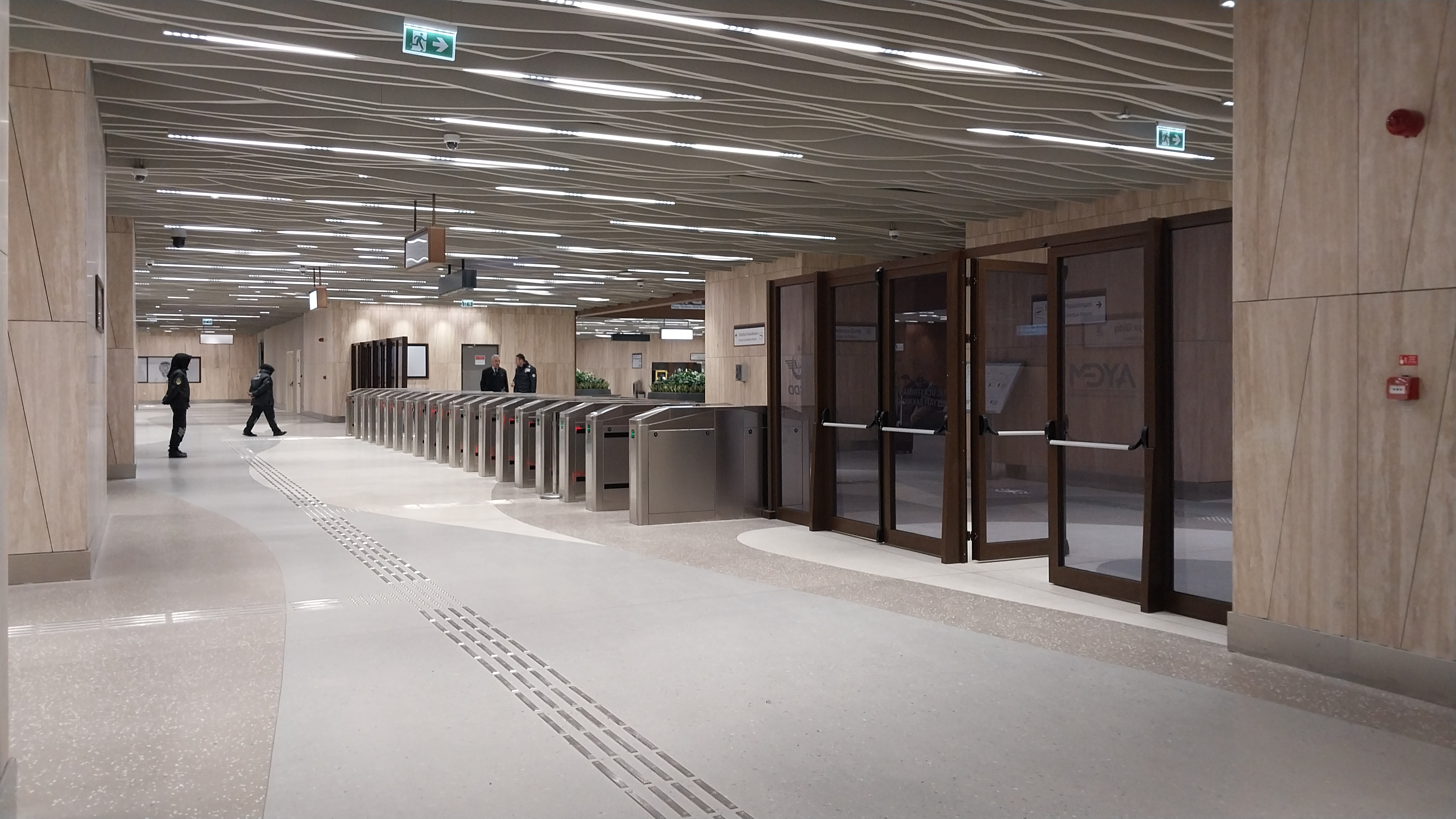
Ticket hall

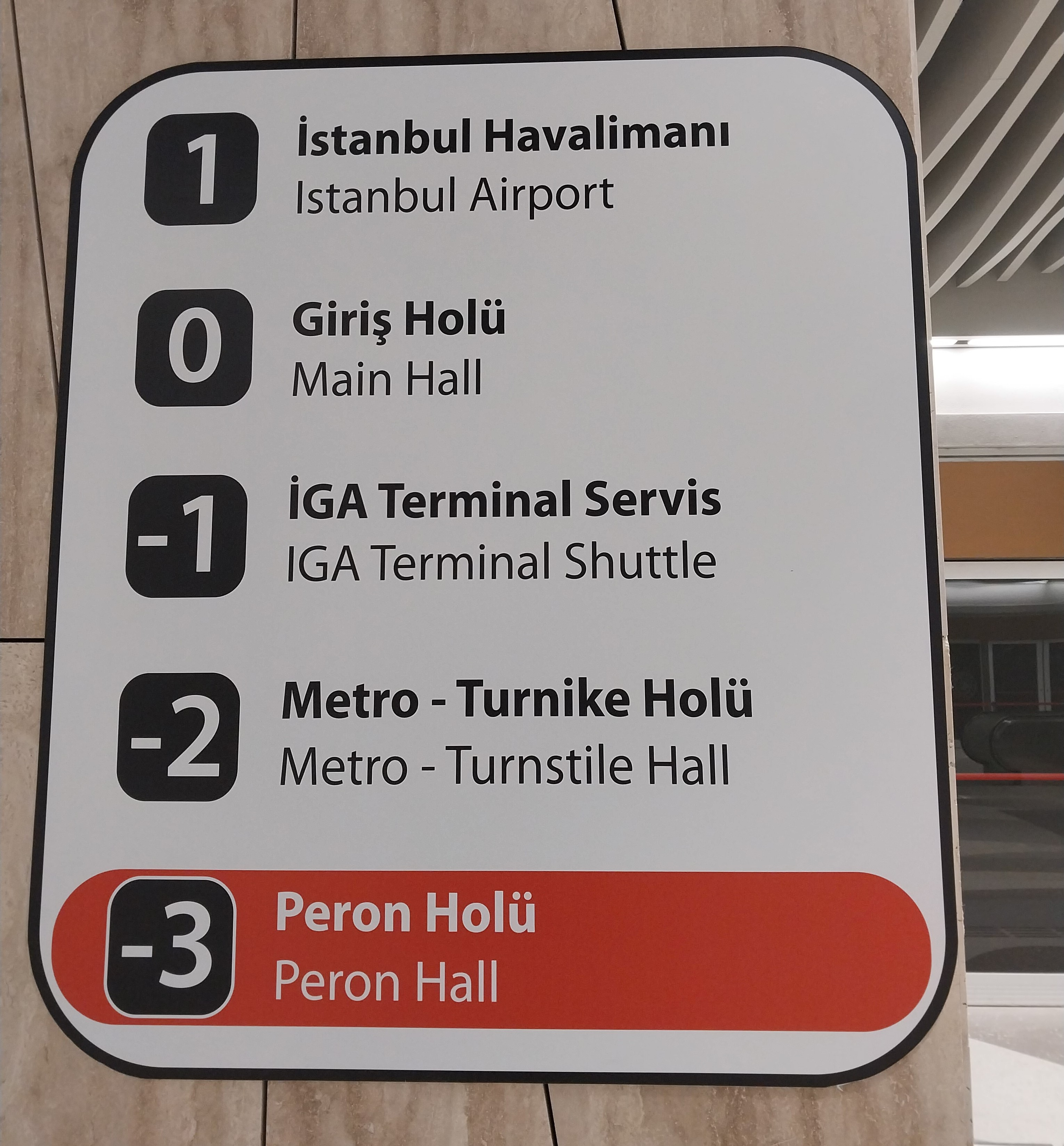
Exit sign

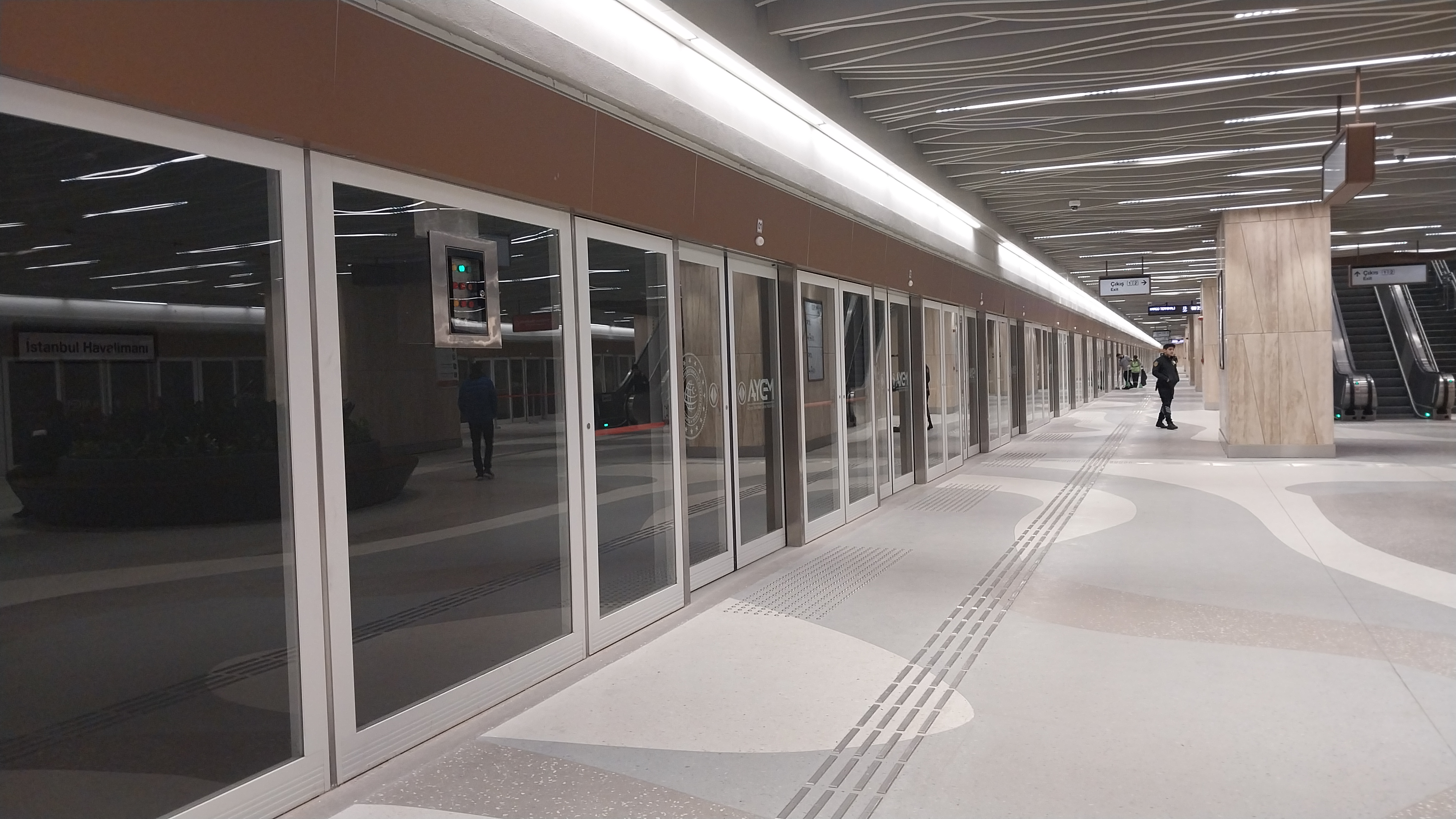
Platform
