= Ibn Khaldun University =

Ibn Khaldun University (Ibn Haldun, Ibn Khaldoun) may refer to:

- Ibn Haldun University in Istanbul, Turkey
- Ibn Khaldoun University of Tiaret in Algeria
- Ibn Khaldoun University in Tunis, Tunisia
