= İbn Haldun Üniversitesi station =

Station of the Istanbul Metro

İbn Haldun Üniversitesi
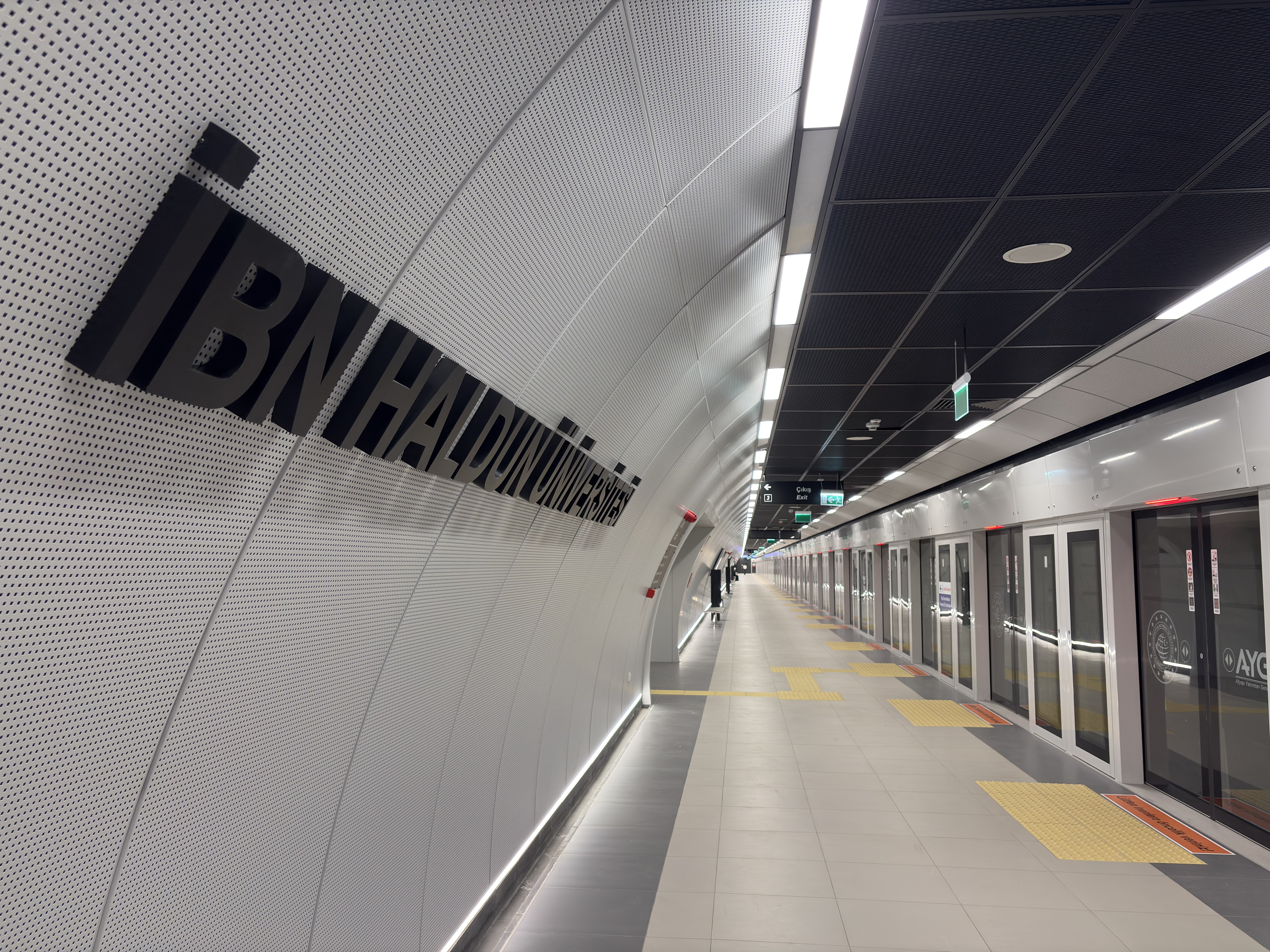
- Platform

General information
- Location: Başakşehir Neighborhood, Rıfat Ilgaz Street, 34480; Başakşehir, Istanbul; Turkey
- Coordinates: 41°8′23″N 28°47′38″E
- System: Istanbul Metro rapid transit station
- Owner: Ministry of Transport and Infrastructure
- Operator: TCDD Transport
- Line: M11
- Platforms: 1 Island platform
- Tracks: 2
- Connections: İETT Bus: 36B, 36CB, 36F, 36HT, 36TC, 36Y, 78B, 78C, 78E, 78F, 78FB, 78G, 78H, 78ZB, 78Ş, 79C, 79F, 79FY, 79GE, 79KM, 79KT, 79M, 98, 98KM, 146BA, 146F, 146K, 336, 336A, 336G, 336H, 336K, 336M, 336MC, 336T, H-6, MK31

Construction
- Structure type: Underground
- Parking: No
- Cycle facilities: Yes
- Accessible: Yes

History
- Opened: 20 June 2026 (2 months ago)
- Electrified: 1,500 V DC Overhead line

Services
Preceding station	Istanbul Metro	Following station
Kayaşehir towards Halkalı	M11 Line	Arnavutköy Hastane towards Gayrettepe
Location

İbn Haldun Üniversitesi (İbn Haldun University) is an underground station on the M11 line of the Istanbul Metro. It is located under Rıfat Ilgaz Street in the Başakşehir neighborhood of Başakşehir, to the west of Ibn Haldun University. It was opened on 20 June 2026.

During construction, the station was named Fenertepe, before being changed to Fenertepe-Üniversite and eventually to its current name of İbn Haldun Üniversitesi.

== Layout ==
Southbound	← toward Halkalı (Kayaşehir)
Island platform, doors will open on the left
Northbound	toward Gayrettepe - Istanbul Airport (Arnavutköy Hastane) →

== Operation information ==
The line operates between 06:00 and 00:40 and train frequency is 20 minutes. The line has no night service.

== Nearby places of interest ==
- Ibn Haldun University

== Gallery ==
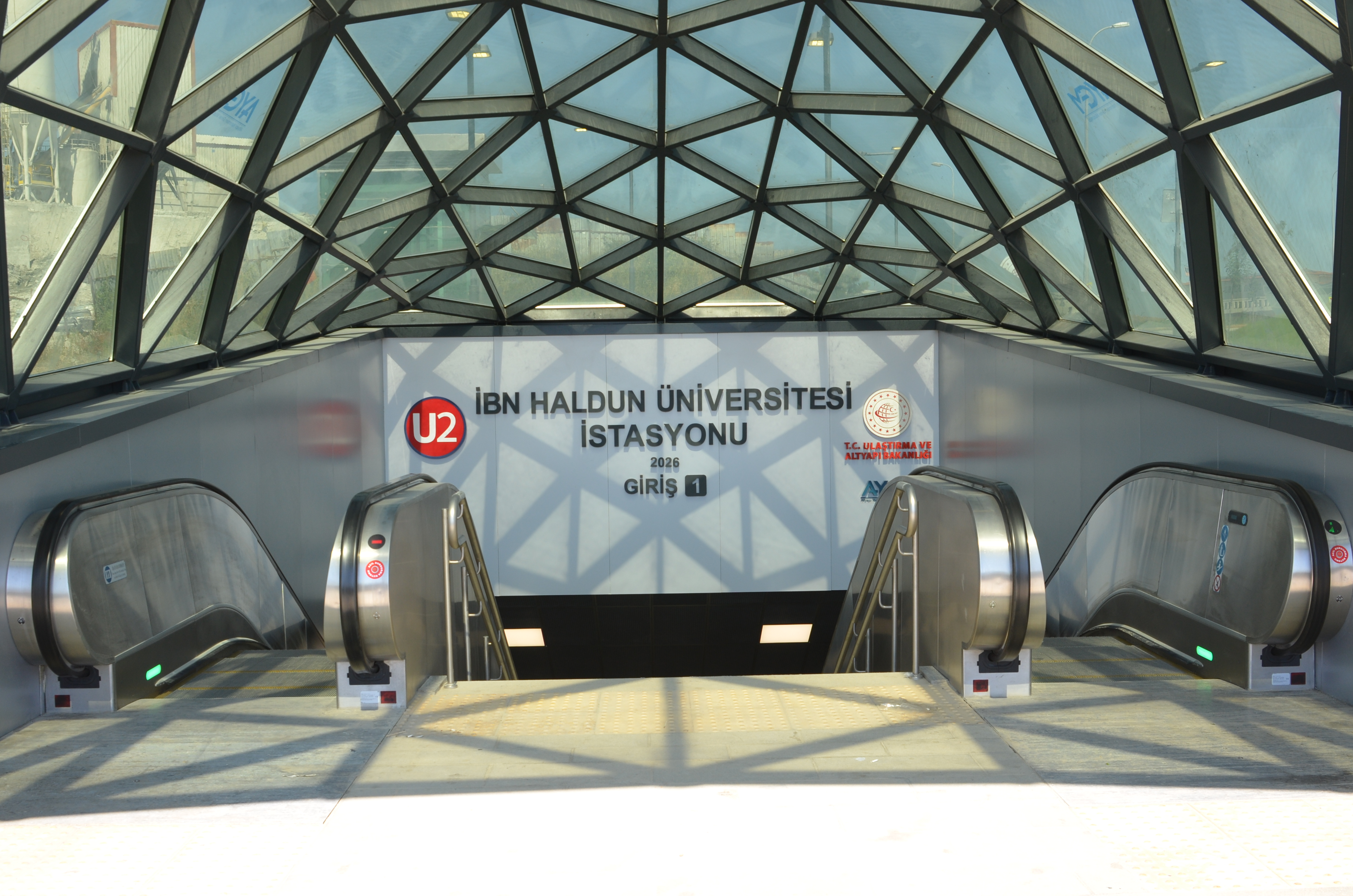
Entrance 1

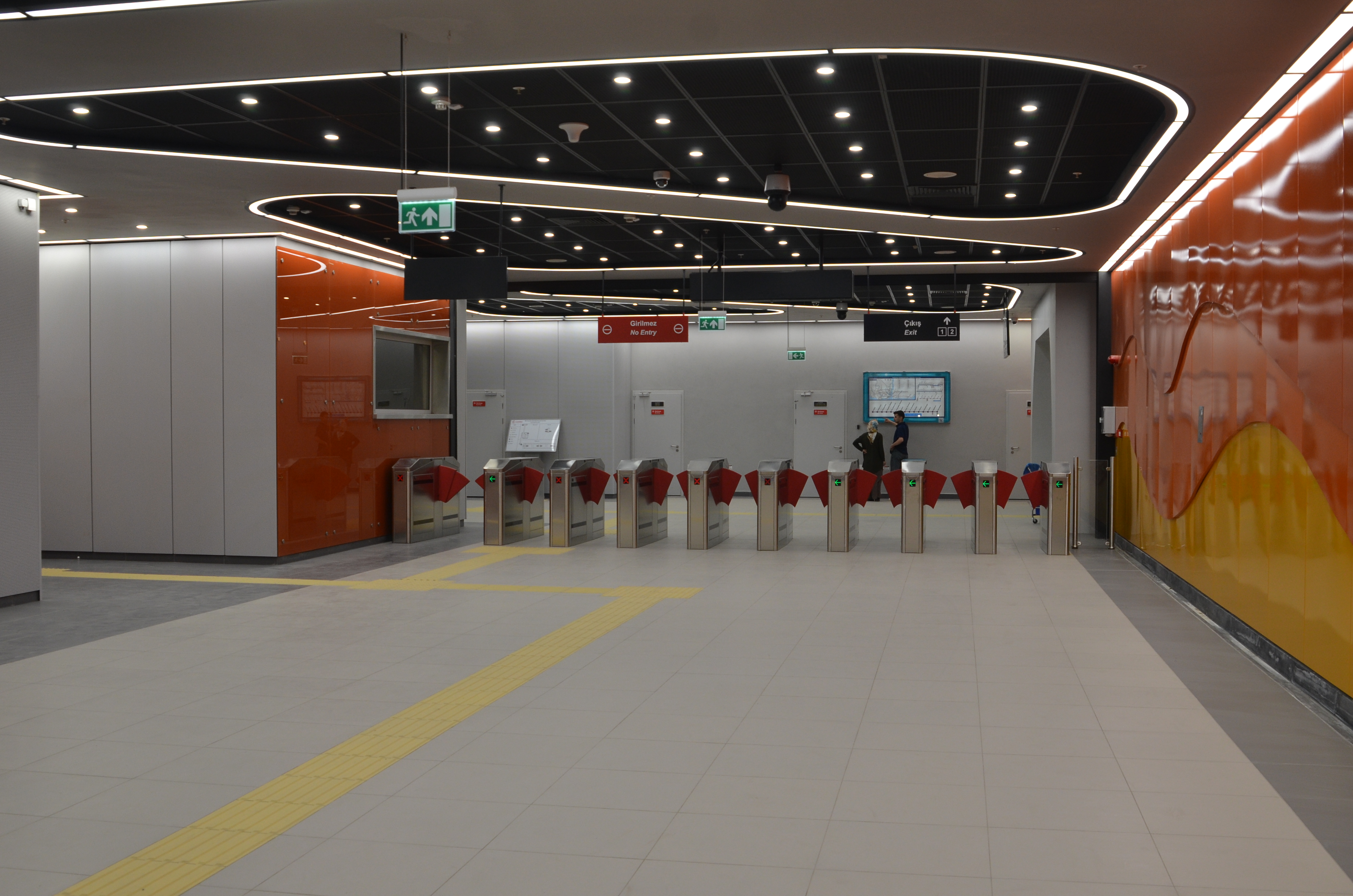
Ticket hall

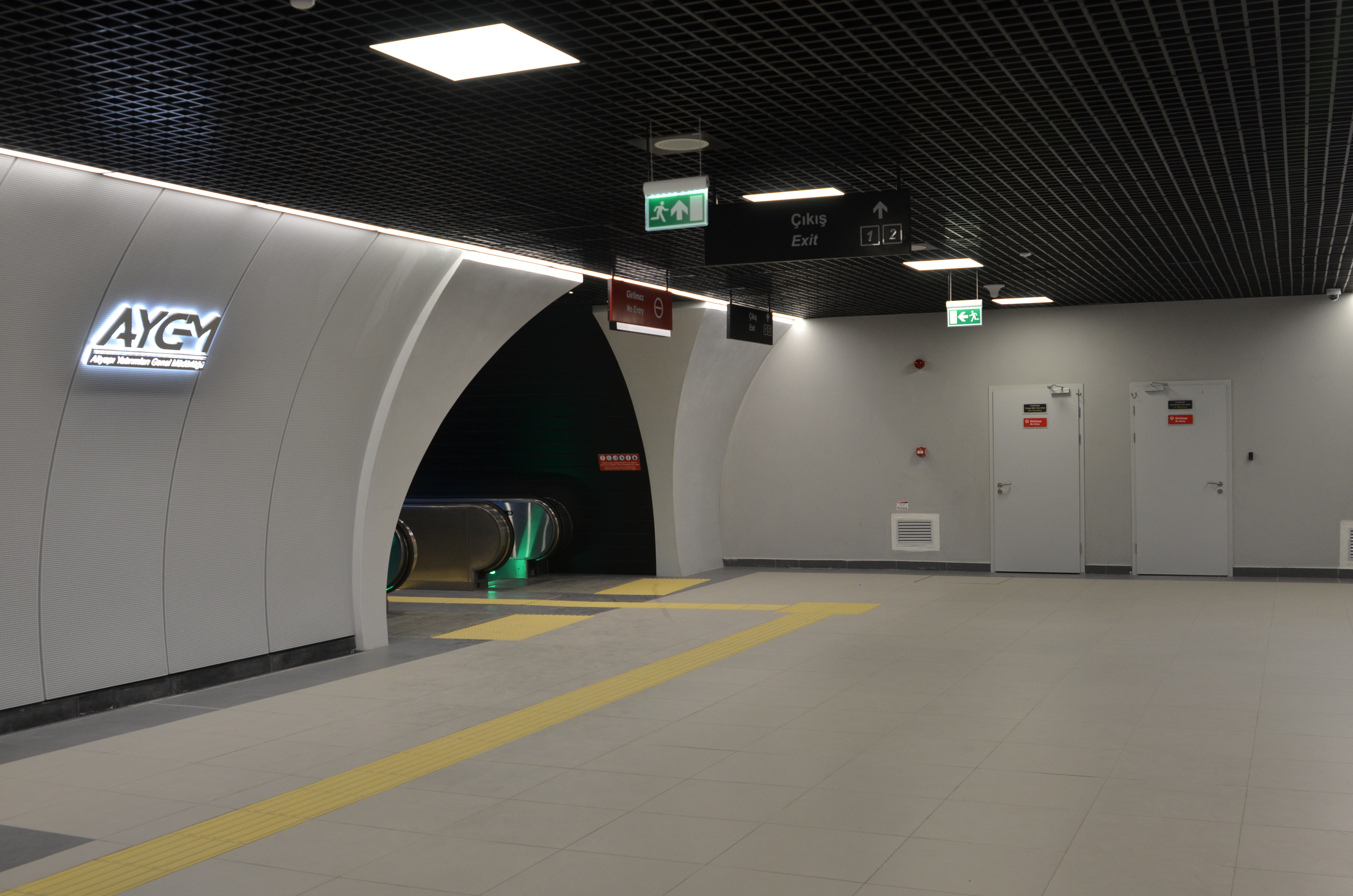
Mezzanine

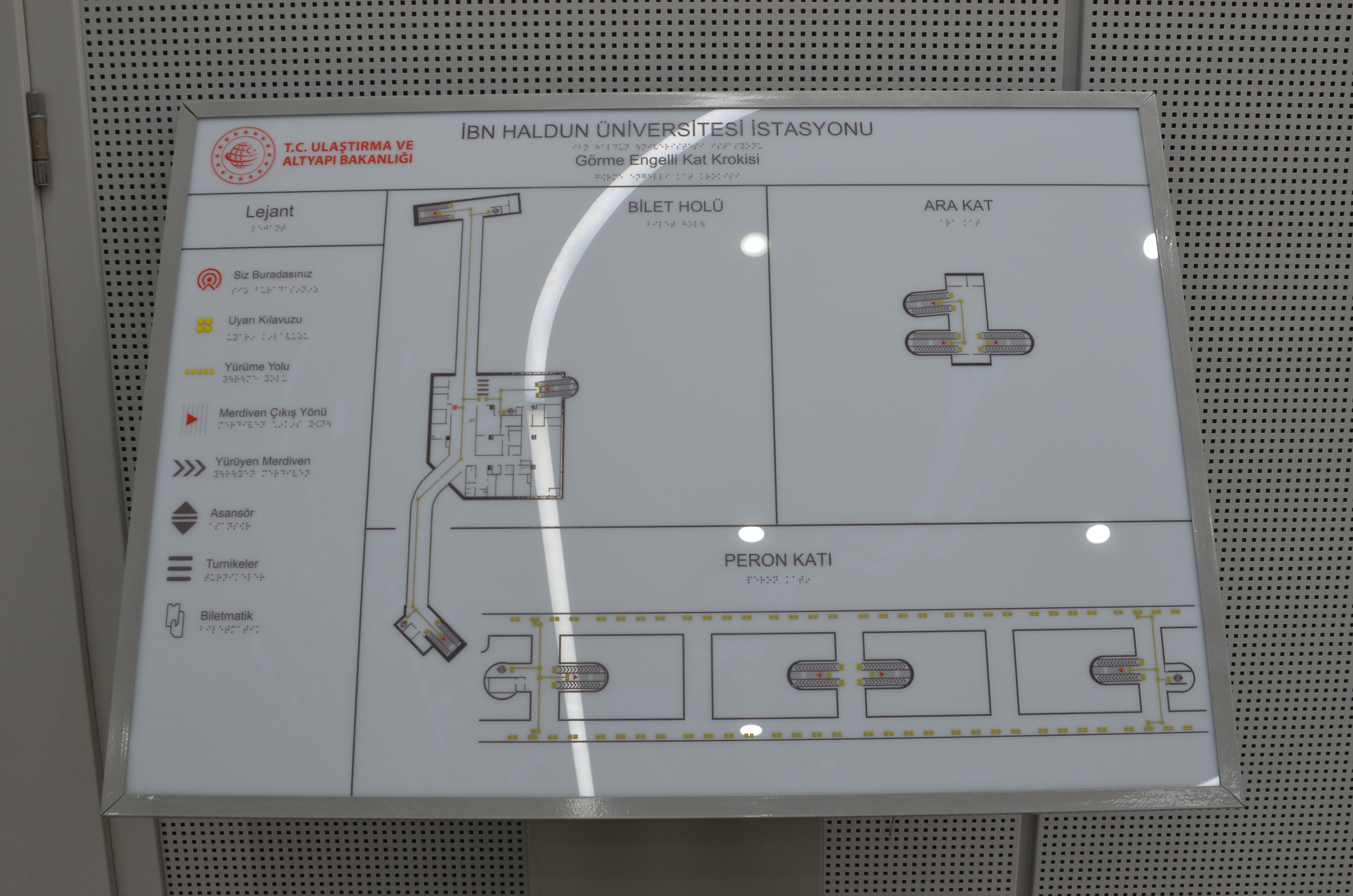
Station diagram (Entrances 1 and 2)

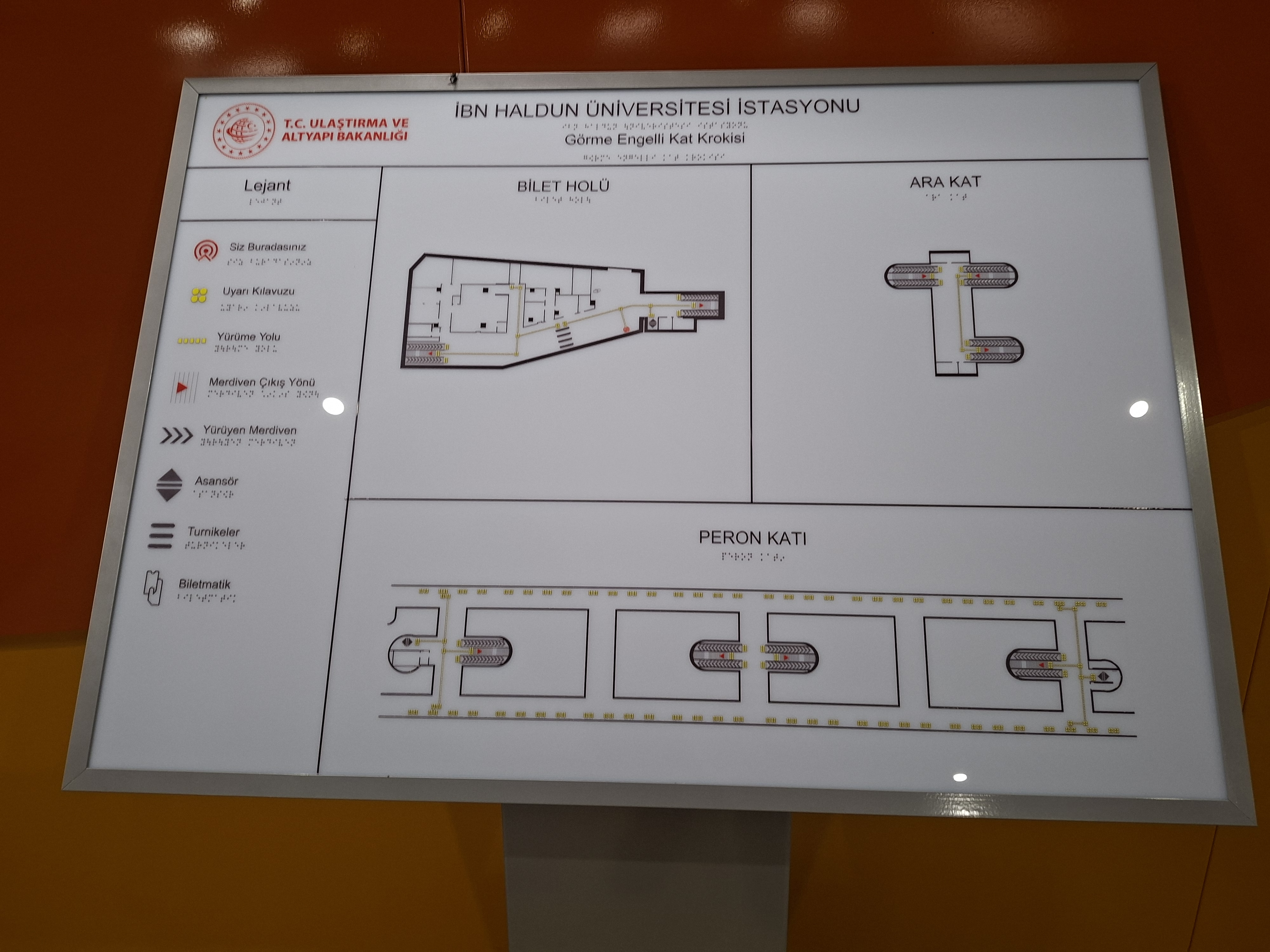
Station diagram (Entrance 3)

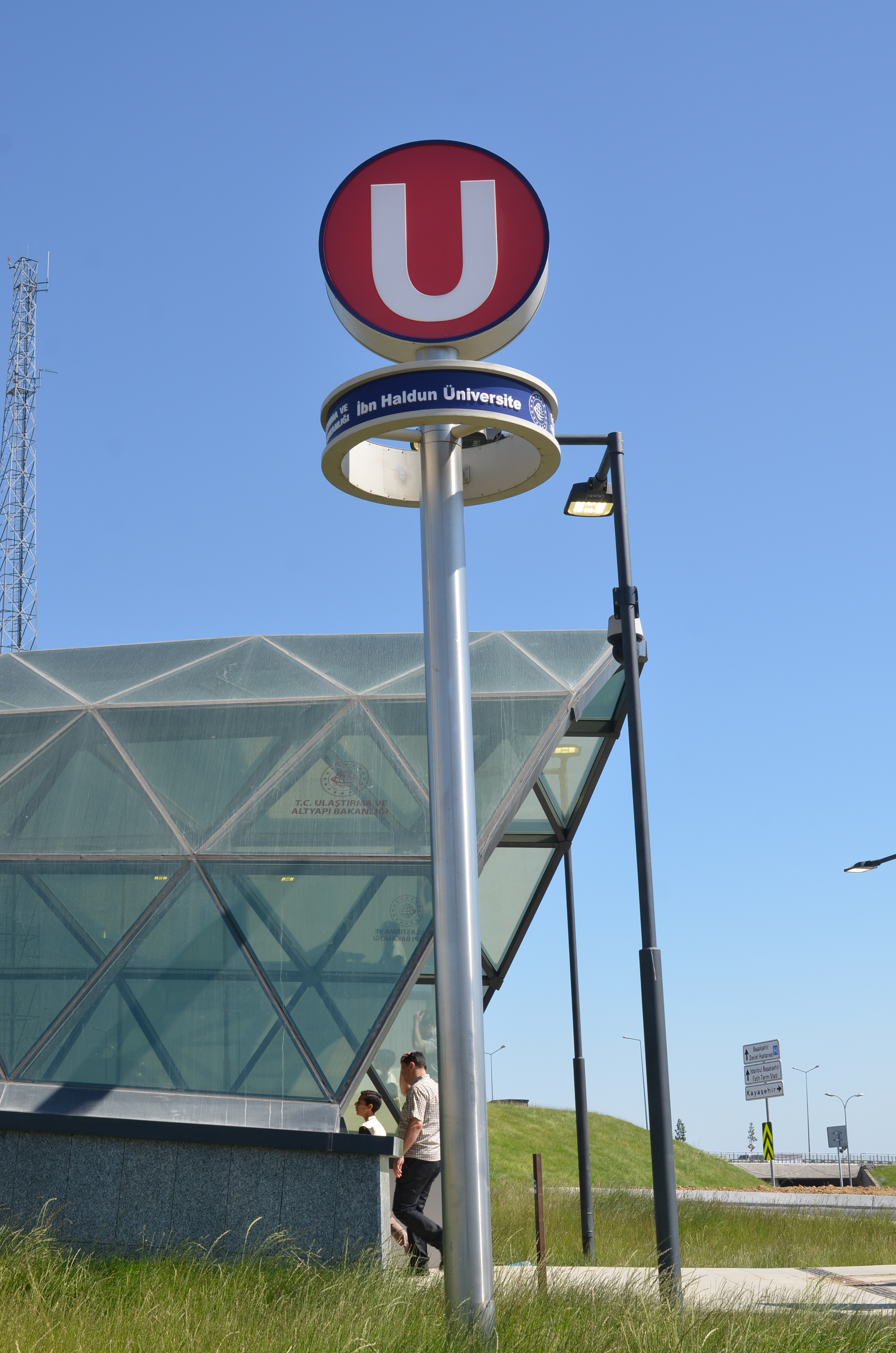
Totem pole

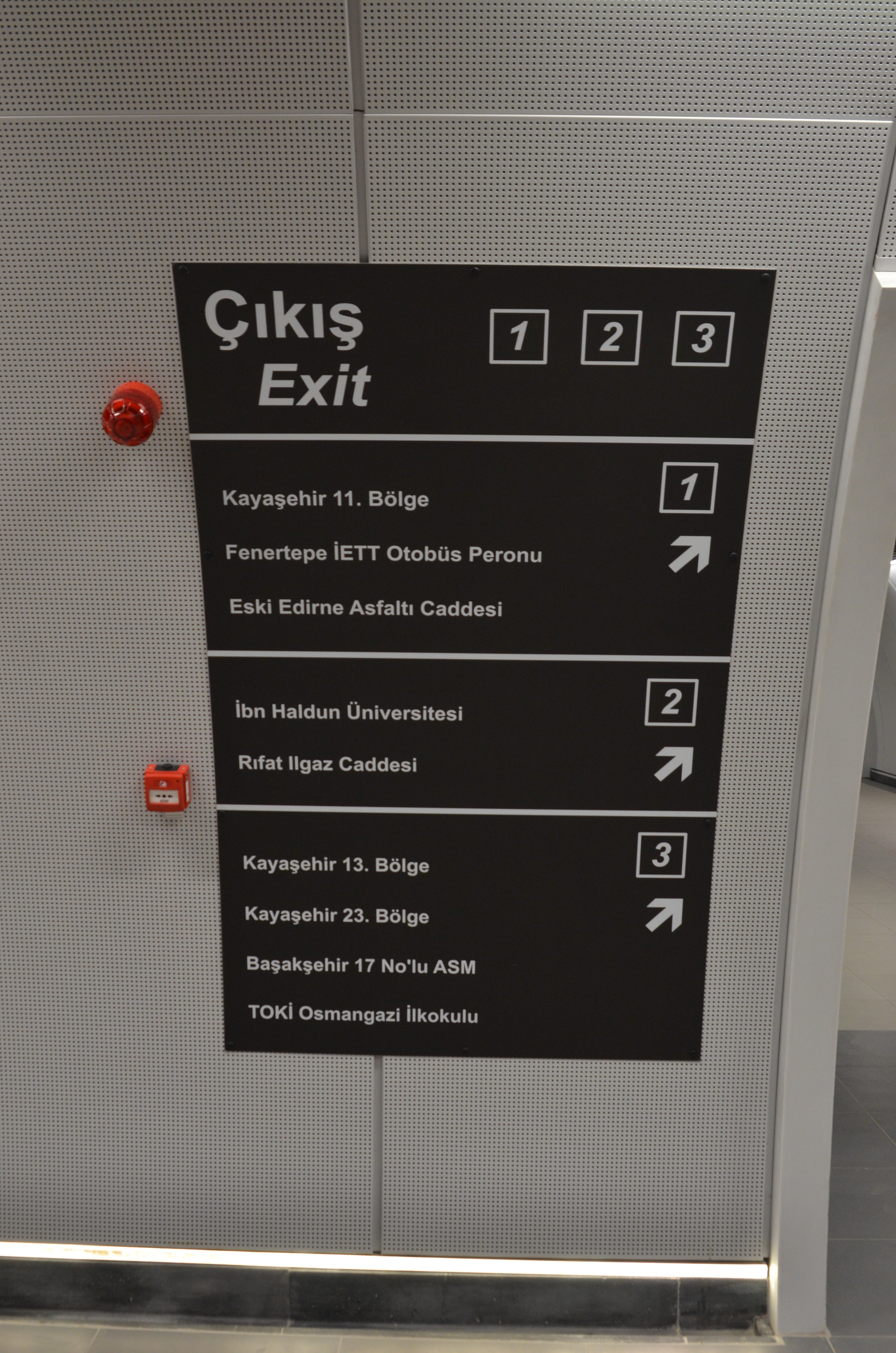
Exit sign

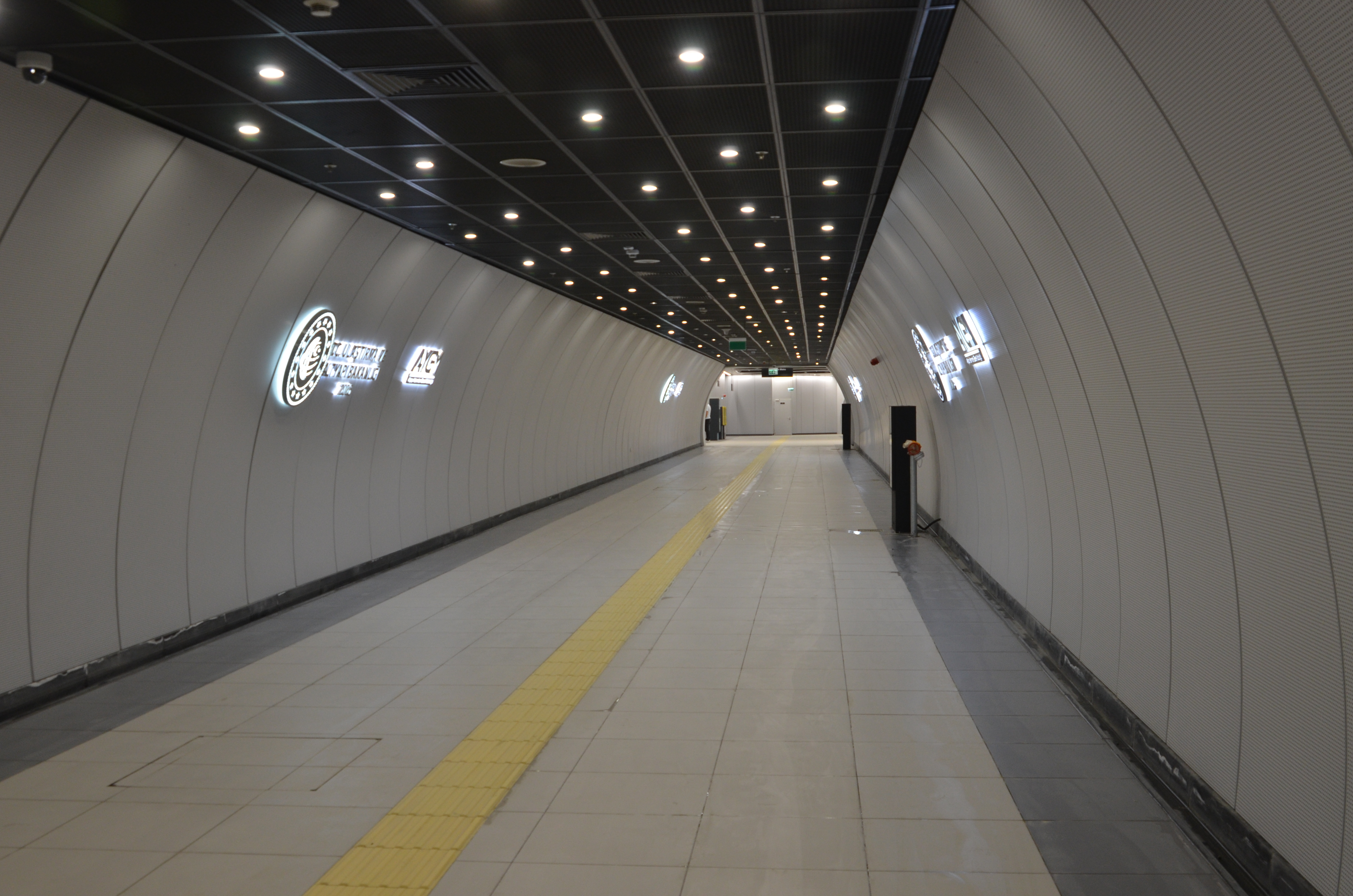
Pedestrian underpass

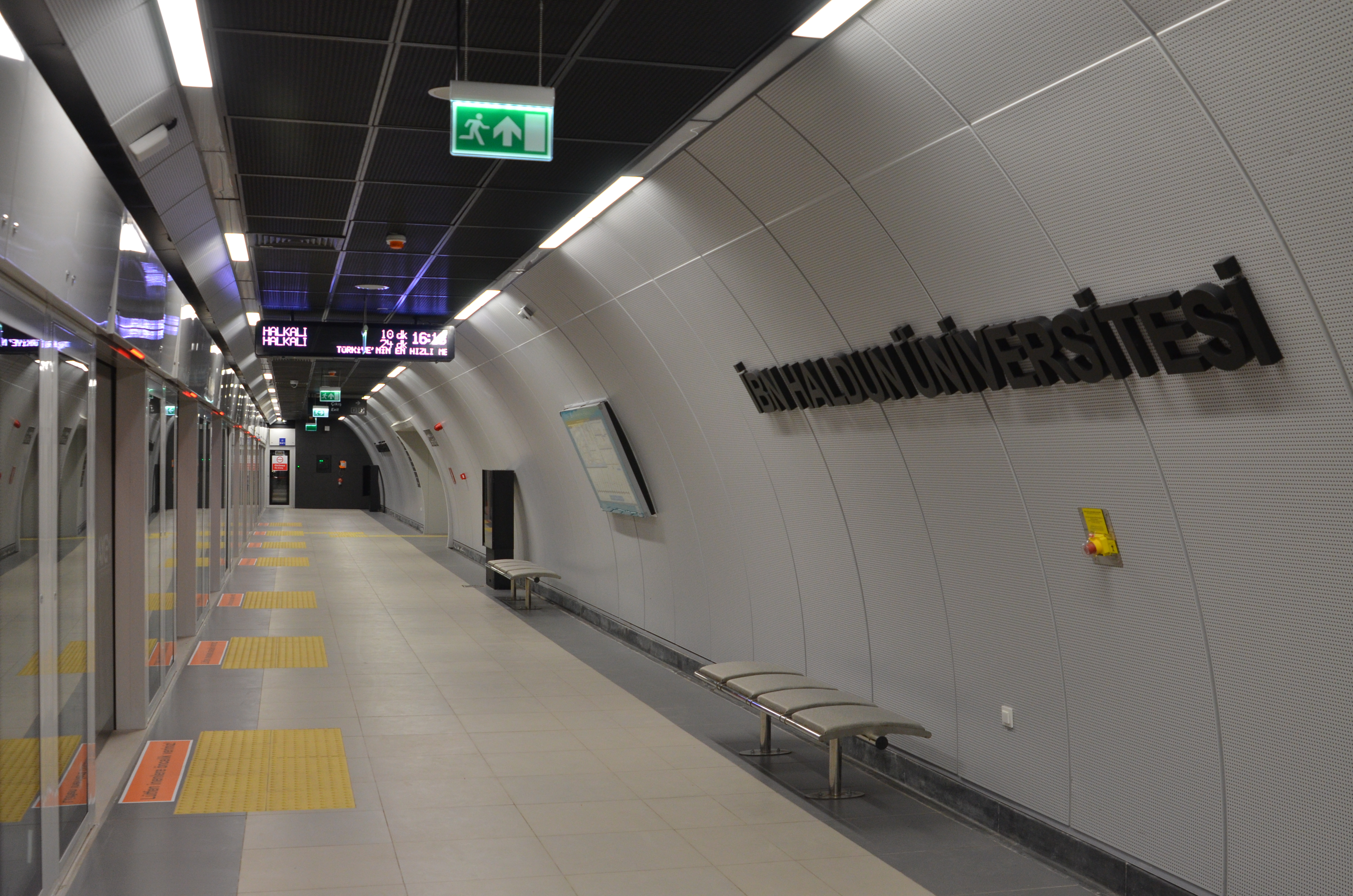
Platform (towards Halkalı)
