= Suraiya Faroqhi =

German scholar and Ottoman historian (born 1941)

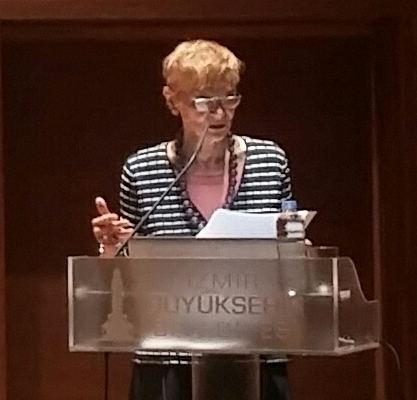
- Suraiya Faroqhi speaking at the Ahmet Adnan Saygun Arts Center in 2017
- Born: 1941 (age 84–85); Berlin, Germany

Academic background
- Education: Hamburg University (BA, PhD); IU Bloomington (MA)

Academic work
- Institutions: University of Minnesota; Middle East Technical University; Ruhr University Bochum; LMU Munich; Dartmouth College; Istanbul Bilgi University; Harvard University; Wissenschaftskolleg zu Berlin; Jawaharlal Nehru University; Ibn Haldun University
- Main interests: Ottoman history
- Notable works: Subjects of the Sultan: Culture and Daily Life in the Ottoman Empire (2005); The Ottoman Empire (2008)

Suraiya N. Faroqhi (born 1941 in Berlin, Germany), is a German scholar, Ottoman historian and a leading authority on Ottoman history. She was elected as a Corresponding Fellow of the British Academy for the year 2022, under the "Early Modern History to 1850" category. She served as a professor at the Department of History at Middle East Technical University and is now at Ibn Haldun University.

== Life ==
She was born in Berlin to a German mother and an Indian father in 1941. When she was studying history at Hamburg University, she spent an academic year at Istanbul University as an exchange student at the age of twenty-one. After completing her Dr. Phil. thesis in 1967, she studied Teaching English as a Second Language at Indiana University in Bloomington, obtaining an MA for Teachers in 1970. As German universities require the publication of doctoral theses and her Dr. Phil. thesis appeared in 1970 as well, both diplomas bear the same date.

After a year at the University of Minnesota in Minneapolis, St. Paul, she began to teach English at Middle East Technical University in Ankara in 1971, promoted to Assistant Professor in the Humanities Department a year later. In 1980, she became an associate professor in Turkey and in 1982, a Privatdozent at the Ruhr-Universität, Bochum. A full professorship at Middle East Technical University followed in 1986. At the end of 1987, she left Ankara after having accepted a professorship at LMU Munich, where she taught until her retirement in 2007. After a term as a Harris Distinguished Visiting Professor at Dartmouth College, New Hampshire during the spring term of 2007, she began to teach at Istanbul Bilgi University, where she was a full-time faculty member until 2017. Becoming an Emerita in 2017, she took up a position at Ibn Haldun University, Istanbul. She was an H.A.R. Gibb Fellow at Harvard University (1983–84), a Fellow at the Wissenschaftskolleg in Berlin (2001-2002) and a Visiting Bhagat Singh Professor at the Centre for Historical Studies, Jawaharlal Nehru University in Delhi, India (2016).

In 1962-63, she arrived at a turning point in her life when she became a student of Ömer Lütfi Barkan, one of the founding fathers of modern Ottoman historiography and a member of the editorial board of Annales ESC. After reading volumes of this journal at Barkan’s recommendation, and Fernand Braudel’s La Méditerranée et le monde méditerranéen à l'époque de Philippe II (Paris, 1949) at a later stage, she felt that this was the type of historiography with which she could identify.

Throughout her career, she has focused on the history of Ottoman cities in the period before about 1850. She is particularly concerned with the hitherto underrepresented world of ordinary urbanites, in particular artisans, women, and slaves. This undertaking has often involved reading Ottoman documents ‘against the grain’ in order to tease out the actions and aspirations of the common people from texts, which for the most part, reflect the aims and interests of the sultans and their officials. However, it bears remembering that to denizens of the twentieth and twenty-first centuries, large sections of this world continue to remain hidden.

== Works ==
=== English ===
- Women in the Ottoman Empire: A Social and Political History (2023)
- Surviving Istanbul: Struggles, Feasts And Calamities in The Seventeenth And Eighteenth Centuries (2023)
- Subjects of the Sultan: Culture and Daily Life in the Ottoman Empire (2005)
- The Ottoman Empire (2008)
- Approaching Ottoman History: An Introduction to the Sources (2000)
- Artisans of Empire: Crafts and Craftspeople Under the Ottomans (2009)
- The Ottoman Empire and the World Around It (2006)
- Coping with the state: Political Conflict and Crime in the Ottoman Empire, 1550-1720 (1995)
- Merchants in the Ottoman Empire (2008)
- Pilgrims and Sultans: The Haji under the Ottomans (1994)
- Stories of Ottoman Men and Women: Establishing Status, Establishing Control (2002)
- Men of Modest Substance: House Owners and House Property in Seventeenth-Century Ankara and Kayseri (2002)
- Animals and People in the Ottoman Empire (2010)
- The Ottomans and the Balkans : A Discussion of Historiography (2002) with Fikret Adanır
- Crafts and craftsmen of the Middle East: Fashioning the Individual in the Muslim Mediterranean (2005) with Randi Deguilhem

=== Turkish ===
- Osmanlı Tarihi Nasıl İncelenir? (Tarih Vakfı Yurt Yayınları, 2009)
- Osmanlı Dünyasında Üretmek, Pazarlamak, Yaşamak (Çeviri kitap, 2003)
- Osmanlı Kültürü ve Gündelik Yaşam: Ortaçağdan Yirminci Yüzyıla (Çeviri kitap, 1997)
- Orta Halli Osmanlılar (Türkiye İş Bankası Yayınları, 2009)
- Osmanlı İmparatorluğu ve Etrafındaki Dünya (Kitap Yayınevi, 2010)
- Osmanlı Şehirleri ve Kırsal Hayatı (Doğu Batı Yayınları, 2006)
- Anadolu'da Bektaşilik (Simurg Yayınları, 2004)
- Hacılar ve Sultanlar 1517-1638 (Tarih Vakfı Yurt Yayınları, 2008)
- Osmanlı' da Kentler ve Kentliler (Tarih Vakfı Yurt Yayınları, 2011)

=== German ===
- Die Vorlagen (telhise) des Großwesirs Sinan Pasa an Sultan Murad III (1967)
- Der Bektaschi-orden in Anatolien (1981)
- Kultur und Alltag im Osmanischen Reich: Vom Mittelalter bis zum Anfang des 20. Jahrhunderts (1995)
- Herrscher über Mekka. Die Geschichte der Pilgerfahrt (2000)
- Geschichte des Osmanischen Reiches (2006)

=== Edited and co-edited volumes ===
- The Cambridge History of Turkey: The Later Ottoman Empire 1603-1839 (2006) edited by S. F.
- Ottoman Costumes: From Textile to Identity (2004) edited by S. F. and Christoph K. Neumann
- Osmanlıda Bir Köle: Brettenli Michael Heberer’in Anıları 1585 - 1588 (2003) (Prologue)
- The Illuminated Table, the Prosperous House: Food and Shelter in Ottoman Material Culture (2003) (Turkish: Soframız Nur Hanemiz Mamur: Osmanlı Maddi Kültüründe Yemek ve Barınak) (2006) edited by S. F. and Christoph K. Neumann
- Armağan: Festschrift für Andreas Tietze (1994), co-edited with Ingeborg Baldauf and Rudolf Vesely
- Türkiye Tarihi: Geç Osmanlı İmparatorluğu 1603-1839 (2011) edited by S. F.
- Osmanlı ve Balkanlar: Bir Tarihyazımı Tartışması (2011), co-edited with Fikret Adanır
