= Heba Raouf Ezzat =

Egyptian academic, thinker, writer and activist

Heba Raouf Ezzat (born 25 July 1965) is an Egyptian academic, writer and activist. She was a visiting lecturer at the American University in Cairo, and Assistant Professor of Political Science at the Faculty of Economics and Political Science of Cairo University. She is among the prominent Egyptian intellectuals who left Egypt after the 2013 Egyptian coup. Currently Raouf teaches political theory at the Alliance of Civilizations Institute, Ibn Haldun University.

== Education ==
Heba Raouf obtained her BA (Honors), MA (Honors) and PhD in Political Science from Cairo University in Egypt.

She completed her BA (Honours) in 1987, and obtained her MA (Honours) in 1992. The title of her MA thesis was "The Woman and Political Work: An Islamic Vision." She obtained her PhD from the Faculty of Economics and Political Science, Cairo University, on 31 May 2007. The topic of her doctorate thesis was "The Concept of Citizenship: A Study of Its Development in Liberal Thought."

== Academic experience ==
Raouf began her academic career at Cairo University as a teaching assistant and then lecturer in political science at Cairo University, where she later became assistant professor (1987–present). She was a visiting scholar at the Center for Democracy Studies at Westminster University, London from September 1995 to September 1996. She visited Oxford Center for Islamic Studies as a researcher from January 1998 to August 1998. She was also a lecturer of political theory at the American University (2006 until present).

She was a founding member of IslamOnline in 1999 and worked as a consultant and writer for the site between 1999-2003. She was a visiting fellow at the Center for Middle Eastern Studies University of California, Berkeley in January–February 2010. She was invited to be an independent visiting scholar at the Prince Alwaleed Bin Talal Center for Muslim-Christian Understanding (ACMCU) Georgetown University in Washington in 2012. She was a visiting scholar at Oxford Center for Islamic Studies in Summer 2012. She was a visiting fellow at London School of Economics (2015-2016).

== Role in politics ==
Before the 2011 revolution, Raouf was involved with various civil political movements in Egypt. She was the founder of the "حماية" (Protection) movement that aimed to make politicians accountable. She was also part of a movement calling for the release of political detainees ahead of the 2005 presidential elections in Egypt.

Raouf was also part of the 10 member advisory committee for drafting the new constitution under Mohammad Morsi in 2012. However, she resigned before it was completed. Along with other pro-democracy intellectuals and activists, Raouf was forced to leave Egypt in the aftermath of the 2013 coup which led to the return of military rule in the country.
