= Recep Şentürk =

Turkish sociologist and former rector of Ibn Haldun University

Recep Şentürk (born 1964, Çankırı, Turkey), is a Turkish academic and sociologist of religion. He was the rector and founding president of Ibn Haldun University from 2017-2021, and is currently the dean of the college of Islamic Studies at Hamad Bin Khalifa University, Qatar. He is a strong advocate of non-western sociological theories such as those by the Muslim sociologist Ibn Khaldun.

== Early life and education ==
He was born at Çankırı in 1964. He completed his bachelor's degree from the Islamic Studies department of Marmara University. In 1988, he completed his postgraduate studies from the Department of Sociology at the Faculty of Arts of Istanbul Üniversity. He became an assistant at the same department after his postgraduate studies. In 1998, he obtained his doctorate from Columbia University in New York, US. He became an assistant professor in 2003 and achieved professorship in 2008.

== Professional life ==
He worked for some time as a researcher at the Center for Islamic Research (ISAM), 29 Mayis University. Afterwards, he worked as the founding director of Medeniyetler İttifakı Enstitüsü (Alliance of Civilizations Institute) at Fatih Sultan Mehmet Vakıf University (FSMVÜ) (since 18 January 2017, the institute was transferred to Ibn Haldun University). He was also a member of the board of trustees of Istanbul Sabahattin Zaim University. He served as the Rector of Ibn Haldun Üniversity, after being appointed to the post by Turkish President Recep Tayyip Erdogan. He is currently serving as the dean of the College of Islamic Studies at Hamad Bin Khalifa University in Qatar.

== Books ==
- Kur'an Meali Mehmed Akif Ersoy (Translation of the Quran MEhmed Akif Ersoy) (Istanbul 2012)
- Türk Düşüncesinin Sosyolojisi: Fıkıh’tan Sosyal Bilimlere (Sociology of Turkish Intellectual Thought: From Fiqh to Social sciences) (2008)
- İnsan Hakları ve İslam: Sosyolojik ve Fıkhî Yaklaşımlar (Human Rights and Islam: Legal and sociological approaches) (İstanbul 2007)
- Malcolm X (Istanbul 2006)
- Narrative Social Structure: Hadith Transmission Network 610-1505 (California: Stanford University Press, 2005)
- Yeni Din Sosyolojileri (Sociologies of New Religions) (İstanbul 2004)
- Toplumsal Hafıza: Hadis Rivayet Ağı 610-1505 (İstanbul 2004)
- Modernleşme ve Toplumbilim (Modernisation and Sociology) (İstanbul [1996] 2006)
- Açık Medeniyet (Open civilization) (İstanbul 2010)
