= Halil Berktay =

Turkish historian (born 1947)

- Born: August 27, 1947 (age 79); İzmir, Turkey
- Education: Yale University (BA, MA); Birmingham University (PhD)
- Scientific career
- Fields: Turkish history
- Workplaces: Ibn Haldun University; Sabancı University; Ankara University; Middle East Technical University; Harvard University

Halil Berktay (born August 27, 1947) is a Turkish historian at Ibn Haldun University. He has worked as a columnist for the daily newspaper Taraf and is one of the first Turkish historians to acknowledge the Armenian genocide as a historical fact.

== Biography ==
Berktay was born in İzmir into an intellectual Turkish communist family. Both of his parents were Cretan Turks. His father, Erdoğan Berktay, was a member of the old clandestine Communist Party of Turkey. As a result of this influence, Halil Berktay remained a Maoist for two decades before he became "an independent left-intellectual".

After graduating from Robert College in 1964, Berktay studied economics at Yale University receiving his Bachelor of Arts in 1968 and Master of Arts in 1969. He went on to earn a PhD from Birmingham University in 1990. He worked as lecturer at Ankara University from 1969 to 1971 and from 1978 to 1983. He took part in the founding of the Yale chapter of the Students for a Democratic Society.

Between 1992 and 1997, he taught at both the Middle East Technical University History Department and Boğaziçi University. He was a visiting scholar at Harvard University in 1997, and taught at Sabancı University before returning to Harvard in 2006. He is currently a professor at Ibn Haldun University, where he is also the head of the History Department.

Berktay's research areas are the history and historiography of Turkish nationalism in the 20th century. He studies social and economic history (including that of Europe, especially medieval history) from a comparative perspective. He has also written on the construction of Turkish national memory.

After Taner Akçam, Berktay was one of the first Turkish historians to acknowledge the Armenian genocide. In September 2005, Berktay and fellow historians, including Murat Belge, Edhem Eldem and Selim Deringil, convened at an academic conference to discuss the fall of the Ottoman Empire.

== Partial bibliography ==
- Kabileden Feodalizme, Kaynak Yayınları, 1983
- Cumhuriyet İdeolojisi ve Fuad Köprülü, Kaynak Yayınları, 1983
- Bir Dönem Kapanırken, Pencere Yayınları, 1991
- New Approaches to State and Peasant in Ottoman History (eds. Halil Berktay and Suraiya Faroqhi), ISBN 0-7146-3468-9
