= Tiaret =

Tiaret تيارت ⵜⵢⴰⵔⵜ
- City
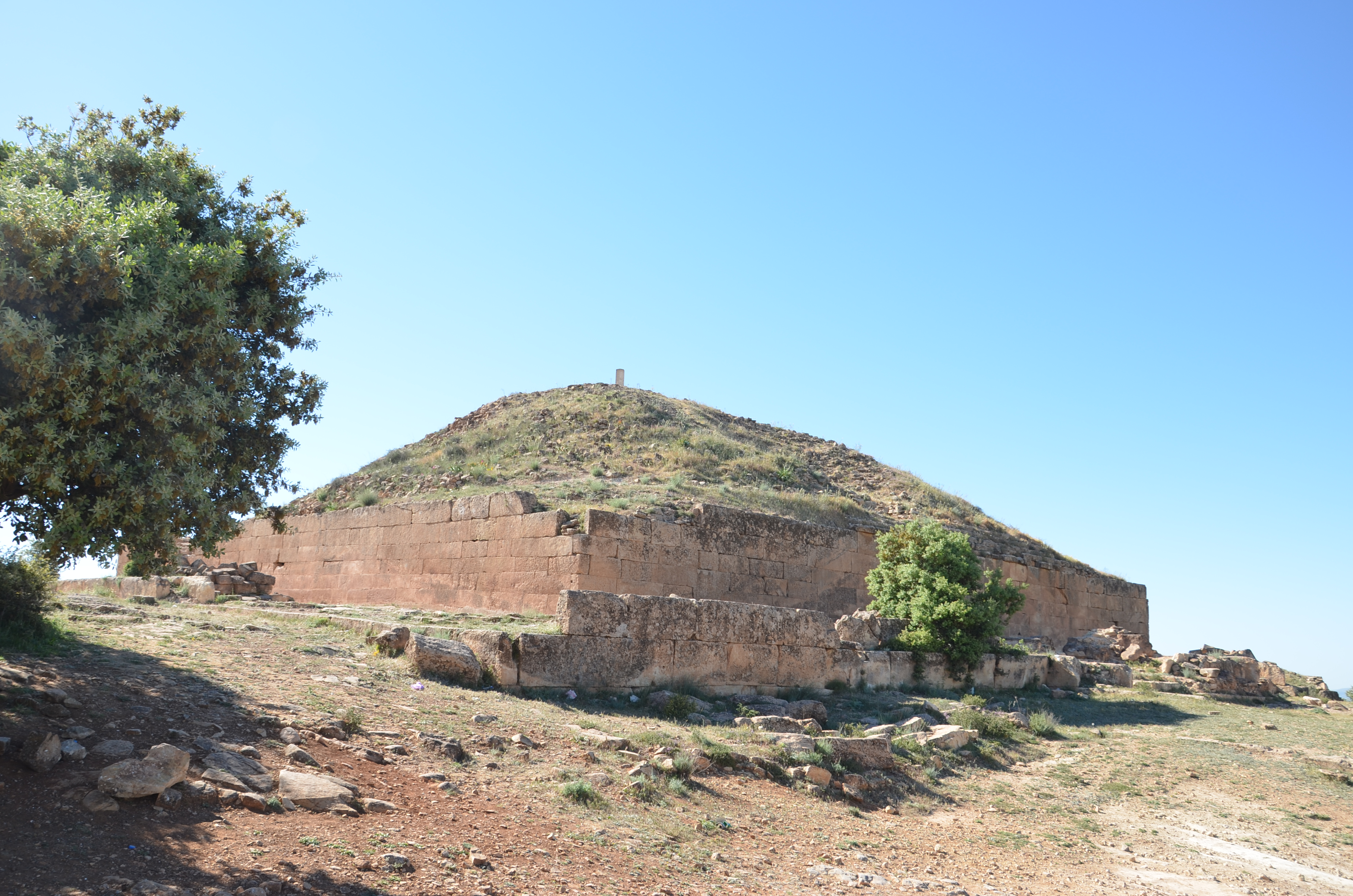
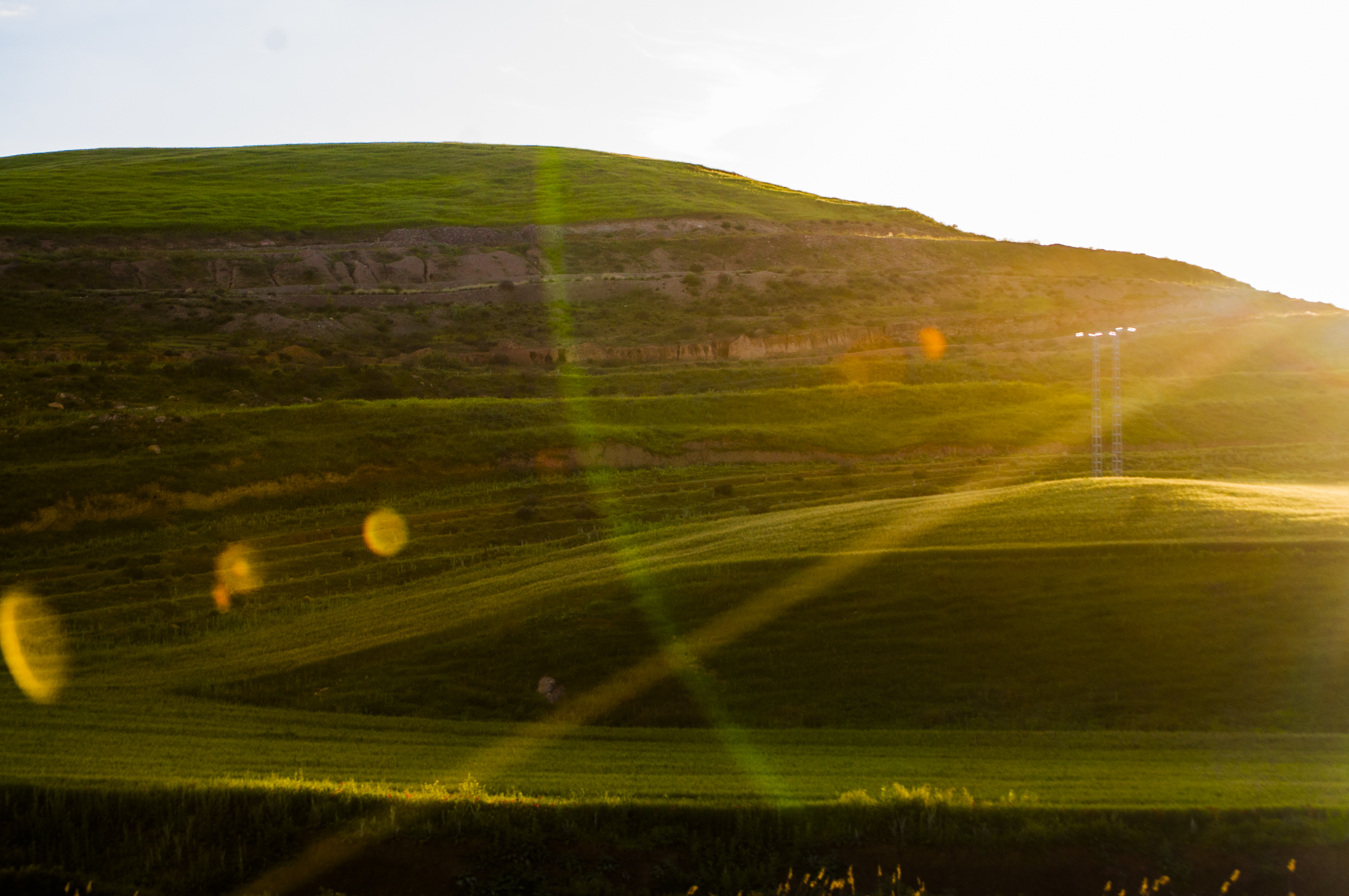
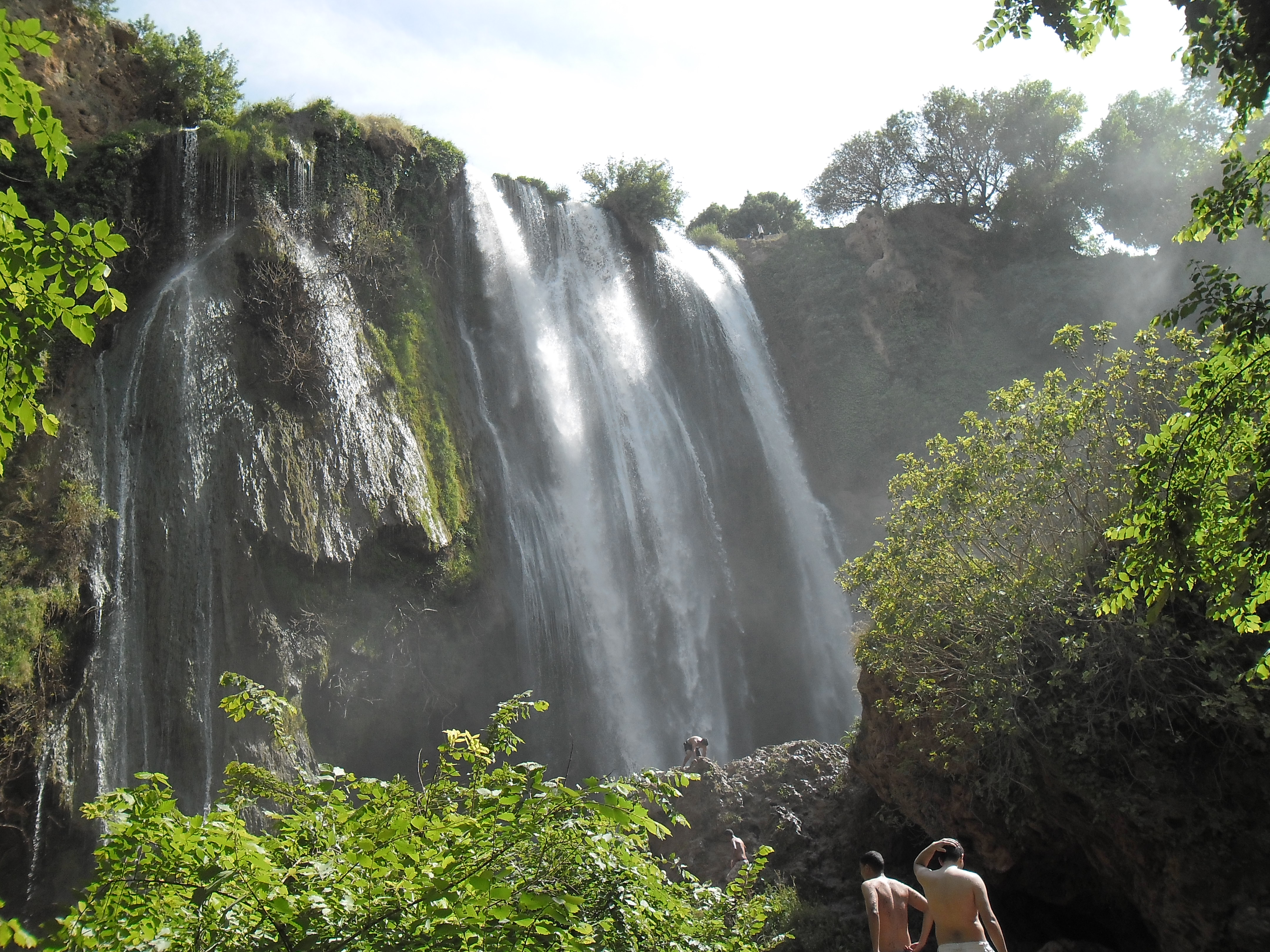
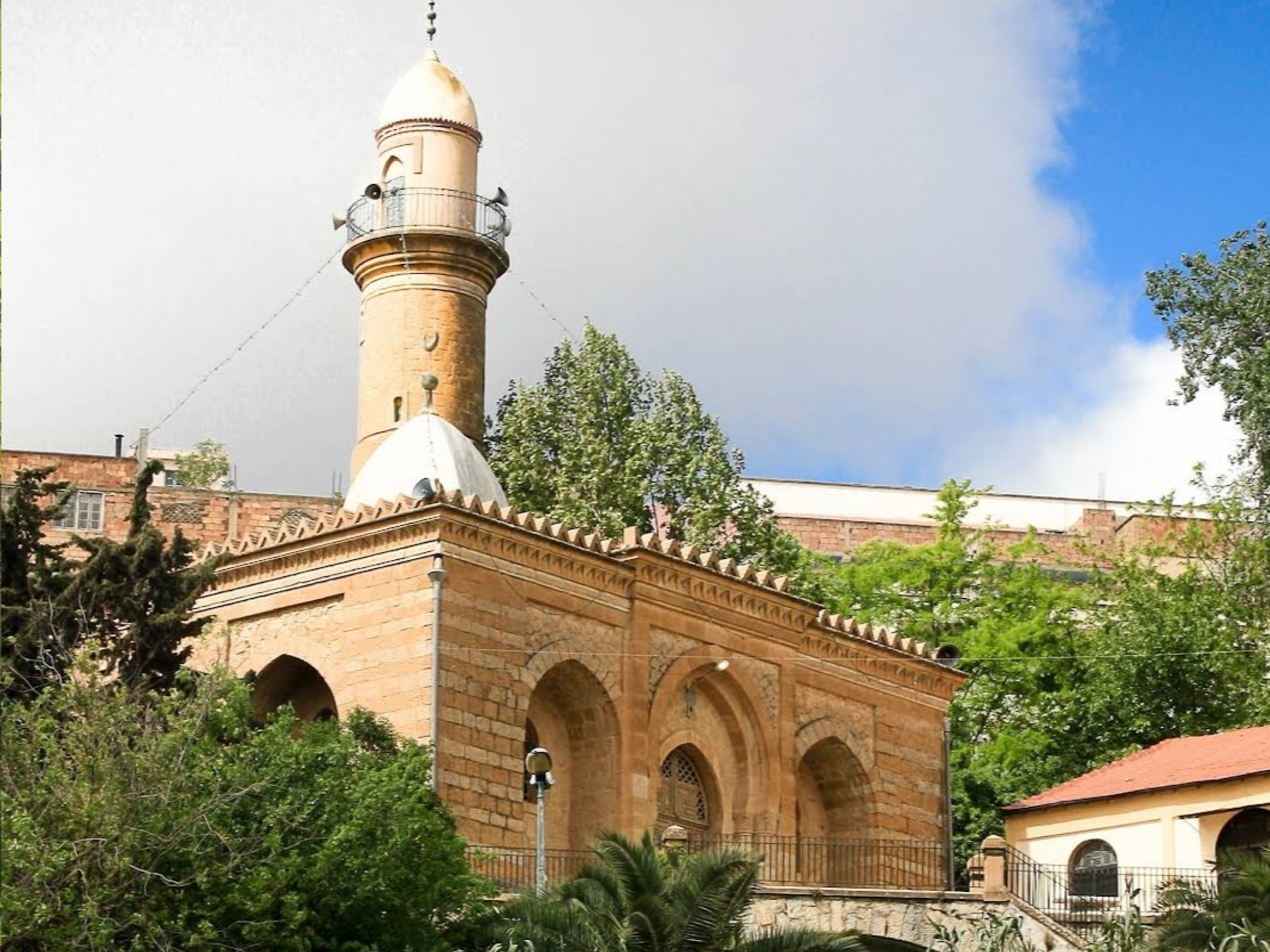
- View of Tiaret at night Lejddars Tiaret Plains Sidi Ouadah Waterfalls El Atik Mosque

- Location within Algeria
- Coordinates: 35°22′N 1°19′E
- Country: Algeria
- Province: Tiaret Province
- District: Tiaret District
- Founded: 778

Area
  - Total: 111.45 km^{2} (43.03 sq mi)
- Elevation: 978 m (3,209 ft)

Population (2008 census)
  - Total: 178,915
  - Density: 1,605.3/km^{2} (4,157.8/sq mi)
- Time zone: UTC+1 (CET)
- Postal code: 14000
- Climate: Csa

Tiaret (Tamazight: ⵜⵢⴰⵔⵜ, romanized: Tyart, Arabic: تيارت, romanized: Tiyārat) or Tahert (Tamazight: ⵜⴰⵀⴻⵔⵜ, Arabic: تاهرت) is a major city in northwestern Algeria that gives its name to the wider farming region of Tiaret Province. Both the town and region lie south-west of the capital of Algiers in the western region of the Hautes Plaines, in the Tell Atlas, and about 150 km (93 mi) from the Mediterranean coast. It is served by Abdelhafid Boussouf Bou Chekif Airport.

== Etymology ==
The name means "Lioness" in the Berber language, a reference to the Barbary lions that lived in this region. Maghrebian place names like Oran (Wahran) which means "lion", and Souk Ahras which means "Market of Lions" have the same etymological source.

== Population ==
The town had a population of 178,915 in 2008. The town covered around 20.086.62 km^{2}.

== Infrastructure and industry ==
A 1992 study by the University of Nice Sophia Antipolis reported significant areas contaminated by industrial pollution, and growing squatter settlements on the periphery.

The region is predominantly one of agriculture. There is a large airfield with a tower and terminal at Abdelhafid Boussouf.

Tiaret has also been home to Ibn Khaldun University since 1980.

The Institute of National Studies of Tiaret holds 25,000 volumes in its library.

== Politics ==
The province suffered massacres (the largest being the Sid El-Antri massacre in 1997), killings, and bombings during the Algerian Civil War, though less so than areas closer to Algiers. The Africa Institute reported in a May 2004 monograph that Tiaret's more "arid and mountainous landscape has facilitated terrorist activities". The MIPT Terrorism Knowledge Base reports that Tiaret "is a frequent site of attacks by the Salafist Group for Call and Combat (GSPC)" (now known as Al-Qaeda in the Islamic Maghreb). The GSPC was "believed to have close ties to Osama bin Laden" (Paris AFX News Agency, 13 July 2005) and Abu Musab al-Zarqawi (Asharq Al-Awsat 3 July 2005), and is reported to be active in Italy (Deutsche Welle, 15 July 2005).

== History ==
The province has been inhabited since antiquity, and there are numerous megalithic monuments. It served as a Roman station and fort, Tingartia. Near Tiaret are the jedars, which are ancient mausoleums. The edifices demonstrate that the area was inhabited during the Late Antiquity by Berber tribes that could build in stone.

Tiaret grew up as a site under the domination of small Berber tribal kingdoms; the first of these being the Rustamid dynasty between 761 and 909 when Tiaret served as the capital of the area. However, this capital may have been 10 km (6.2 mi) west of the present-day Tiaret. It was first founded by Abd al-Rahman ibn Rustam, an Ibadi theologian from Greater Iran. Tiaret was said to be relatively free-thinking and democratic, being a centre for scholarship that permitted a wide range of sects and movements, notably the Mu'tazila. There were many Jews living in the area until at least the 10th century, including the scholar and doctor Judah ibn Kuraish who became the doctor to the Emir of Fes. Tiaret was captured by the Fatimids in 909.

Tiaret occupies a strategic mountain pass at 3,552 feet (1,083 m), and was thus a key to dominating the central Maghreb. Later, from the start of the 8th century, it was the key northern terminus of the West African branch of the slave trade. As such, it offered a lucrative income from taxes on the trade, and was a desirable prize.

The Rustamid empire, which during the reign of Abdurrahman (766–784) and his son Abdul Wahab (784–823) extended over the greater part of the modern Algeria, was known as the Ibadite Empire from Abdallah ibn Ibad, the founder of the sect to which Abdurrahman belonged. Seven princes of the Rustamite house succeeded Abdul Wahab until they were overthrown by the Fatimid general Abu Abdallah al-Shi'i in 909.

From the year 911 Tiaret was fought over by a number of tribes, being first captured by Massala ibn Habbus of the Miknasas in the year 911, in alliance with the Fatimid Caliphate. Finally, in 933, it was in the hands of the Fatimids. After 933 Tiaret ceased to be the capital of a separate state. Most of the population was banished to Ouargla and then escaped to the inhospitable M'zab.

From 933 it was administered as part of the Kingdom of Tlemcen, and in the 16th century fell to the Ottoman Empire. In 1843 it fell to the French after they defeated Emir Abdelkader El Djezairi.

The modern town of Tiaret is built around a French redoubt of 1845. The new town attracted many settlers from France and the area flourished. A 200 km (120 mi) narrow gauge railway arrived in 1889, connecting the town to Mostaganem; today, this rail line is defunct.

== Archeological attractions ==
Thirty kilometres (19 mi) south-southwest of Tiaret are the sepulchral monuments known as the Jedars. The name is given to a number of sepulchral monuments placed on hill-tops. A rectangular or square podium is in each case surmounted by a pyramid. The tombs date from the 5th to the 7th century, and lie in two distinct groups between Tiaret and Frenda.

At Mechra-Sfa ("ford of the flat stones"), a peninsula in the valley of the river Mina not far from Tiaret, are said to be "vast numbers" of megalithic monuments.

== Climate ==
Tiaret displays a Mediterranean climate. In winter, there is more rainfall than in summer. The Köppen-Geiger climate classification is Csa. The average annual temperature in Tiaret is 15.2 °C (59.4 °F). About 380 mm (14.96 in) of precipitation falls annually.

Climate data for Tiaret (1991–2020)
Month	Jan	Feb	Mar	Apr	May	Jun	Jul	Aug	Sep	Oct	Nov	Dec	Year
Record high °C (°F)	24.5 (76.1)	25.8 (78.4)	30.0 (86.0)	31.3 (88.3)	40.0 (104.0)	41.6 (106.9)	43.0 (109.4)	42.2 (108.0)	40.1 (104.2)	36.3 (97.3)	28.1 (82.6)	25.0 (77.0)	43.0 (109.4)
Mean daily maximum °C (°F)	11.6 (52.9)	12.7 (54.9)	16.0 (60.8)	19.1 (66.4)	24.5 (76.1)	30.8 (87.4)	35.4 (95.7)	34.7 (94.5)	28.8 (83.8)	23.2 (73.8)	16.0 (60.8)	12.4 (54.3)	22.1 (71.8)
Daily mean °C (°F)	6.2 (43.2)	6.9 (44.4)	9.7 (49.5)	12.2 (54.0)	16.7 (62.1)	22.2 (72.0)	26.5 (79.7)	26.1 (79.0)	21.3 (70.3)	16.5 (61.7)	10.5 (50.9)	7.3 (45.1)	15.2 (59.4)
Mean daily minimum °C (°F)	0.8 (33.4)	1.2 (34.2)	3.4 (38.1)	5.3 (41.5)	9.0 (48.2)	13.6 (56.5)	17.6 (63.7)	17.6 (63.7)	13.8 (56.8)	9.9 (49.8)	5.1 (41.2)	2.2 (36.0)	8.3 (46.9)
Record low °C (°F)	−11.4 (11.5)	−12.0 (10.4)	−6.2 (20.8)	−3.5 (25.7)	−3.1 (26.4)	3.1 (37.6)	7.7 (45.9)	5.1 (41.2)	5.0 (41.0)	−2.0 (28.4)	−6.8 (19.8)	−7.6 (18.3)	−12.0 (10.4)
Average precipitation mm (inches)	44.4 (1.75)	42.4 (1.67)	43.1 (1.70)	43.6 (1.72)	29.9 (1.18)	11.0 (0.43)	3.8 (0.15)	10.5 (0.41)	31.5 (1.24)	35.8 (1.41)	41.5 (1.63)	40.5 (1.59)	378.0 (14.88)
Average precipitation days (≥ 1.0 mm)	8.1	7.6	6.9	6.3	4.7	1.9	1.0	2.2	4.4	5.5	7.1	7.4	63.1
Source: NOAA
