= Kayaşehir station =

Station of the Istanbul Metro

Kayaşehir
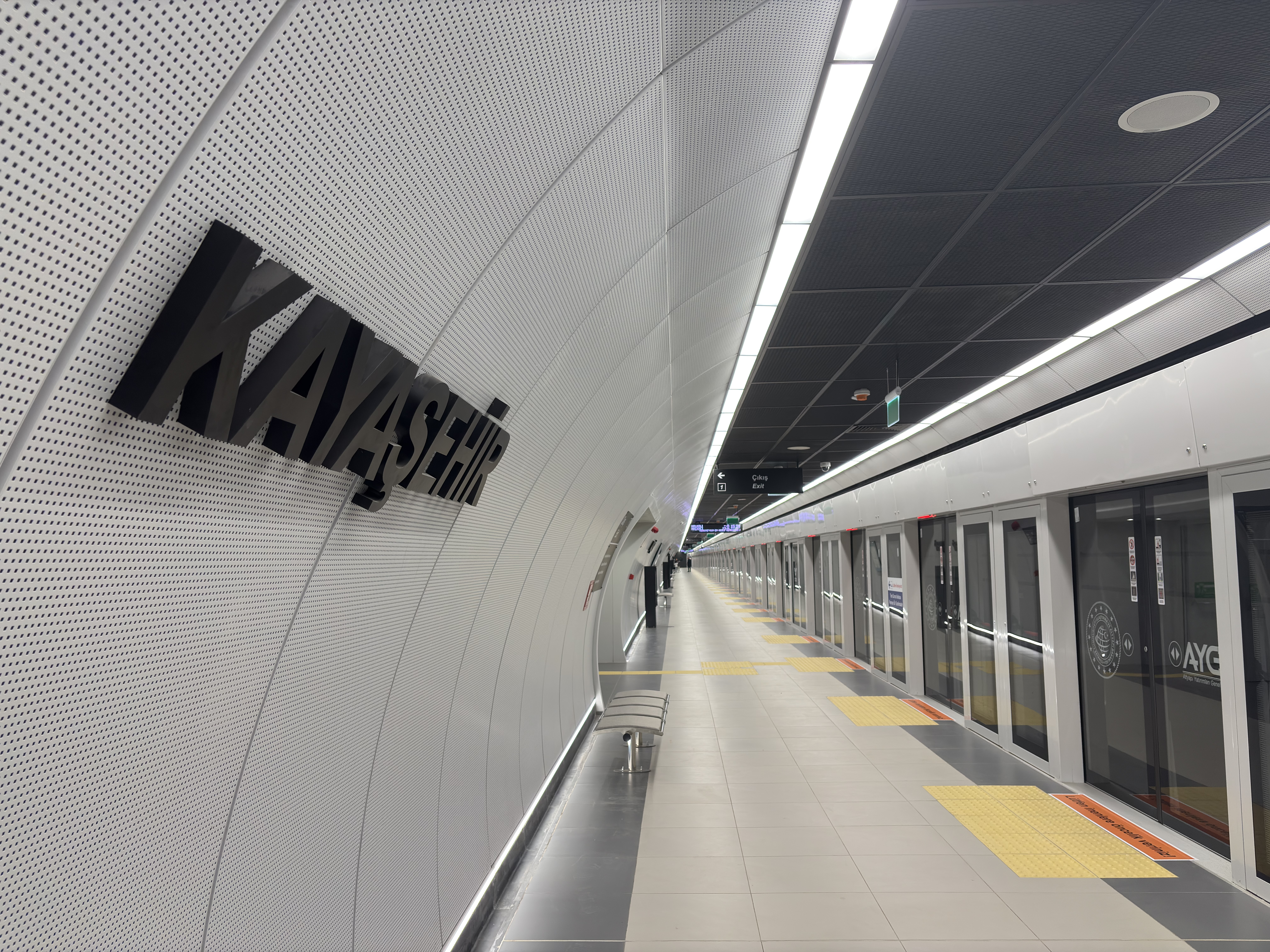
- Platform

General information
- Location: Kayabaşı Neighborhood, Kayaşehir Boulevard, 34494; Başakşehir, Istanbul; Turkey
- Coordinates: 41°7′3″N 28°45′57″E
- System: Istanbul Metro rapid transit station
- Owner: Ministry of Transport and Infrastructure
- Operator: TCDD Transport
- Line: M11
- Platforms: 1 Island platform
- Tracks: 2
- Connections: M3 (Kayaşehir Merkez); İETT Bus: Celalettin Ökten Kız Anadolu İmam Hatip Lisesi: 36F, 78F, 79F, 79FY, 79GE, 79KM, 79KT, MK22; Istanbul Minibus: Forum İstanbul - Kayaşehir (A15)

Construction
- Structure type: Underground
- Parking: No
- Cycle facilities: Yes
- Accessible: Yes

History
- Opened: 20 June 2026 (2 months ago)
- Electrified: 1,500 V DC Overhead line

Services
Preceding station	Istanbul Metro	Following station
Olimpiyatköy towards Halkalı	M11 Line	İbn Haldun Üniversitesi towards Gayrettepe
Transfer at Kayaşehir Merkez
Terminus	M3 Line	Toplu Konutlar towards Bakırköy Sahil
Location

Kayaşehir is an underground station on the M11 line of the Istanbul Metro. It is located under Kayaşehir Boulevard in the Kayabaşı neighborhood of Başakşehir. It was opened on 20 June 2026. The station is an interchange station with the M3 line at Kayaşehir Merkez, which uses a different station name but provides an in-station transfer with the M11 line.

== Layout ==
Southbound	← toward Halkalı (Olimpiyatköy)
Island platform, doors will open on the left
Northbound	toward Gayrettepe - Istanbul Airport (İbn Haldun Üniversitesi) →

== Operation information ==
The line operates between 06:00 and 00:40 and train frequency is 20 minutes. The line has no night service.

== Gallery ==
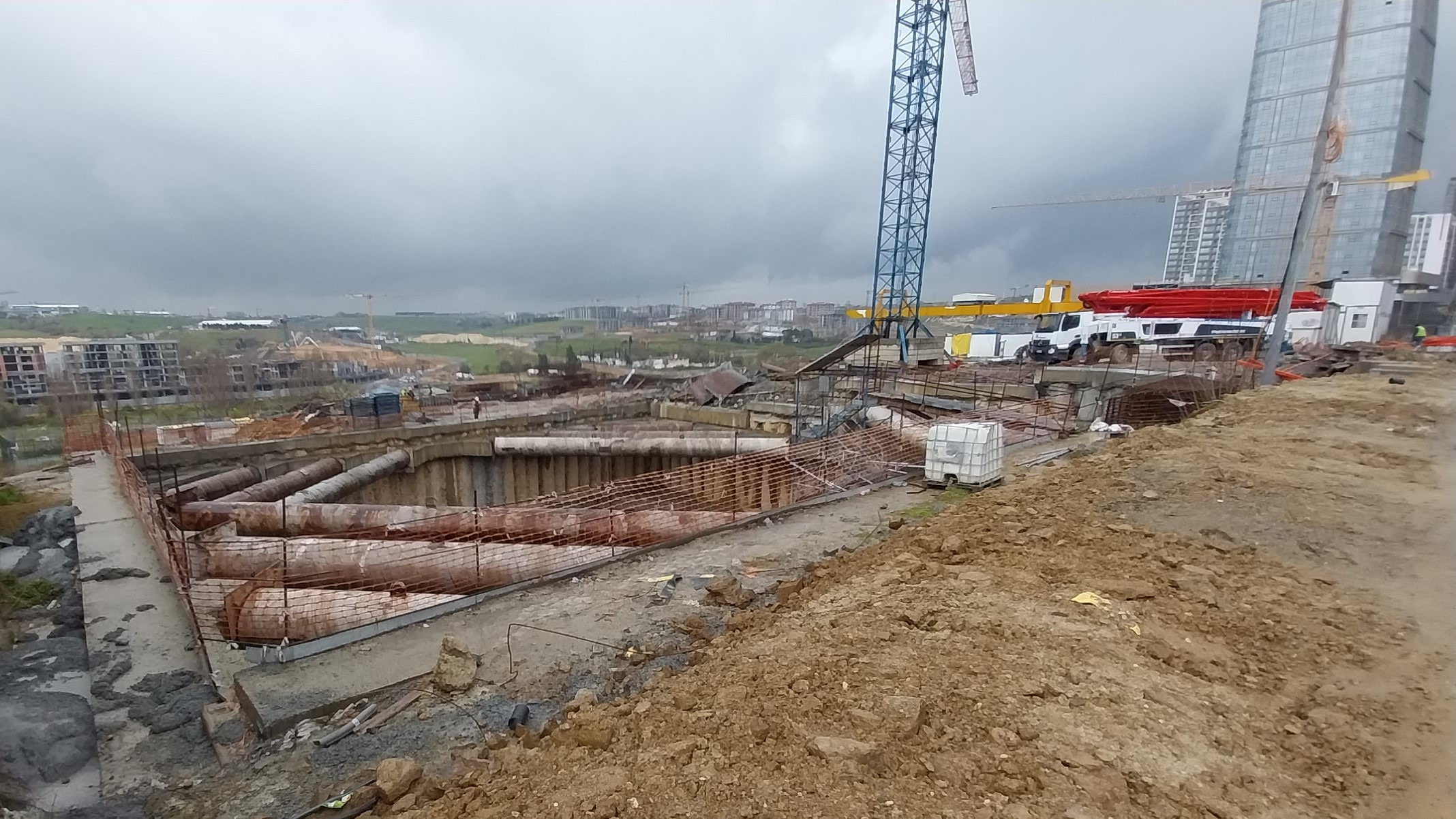
Construction site (April 2023)

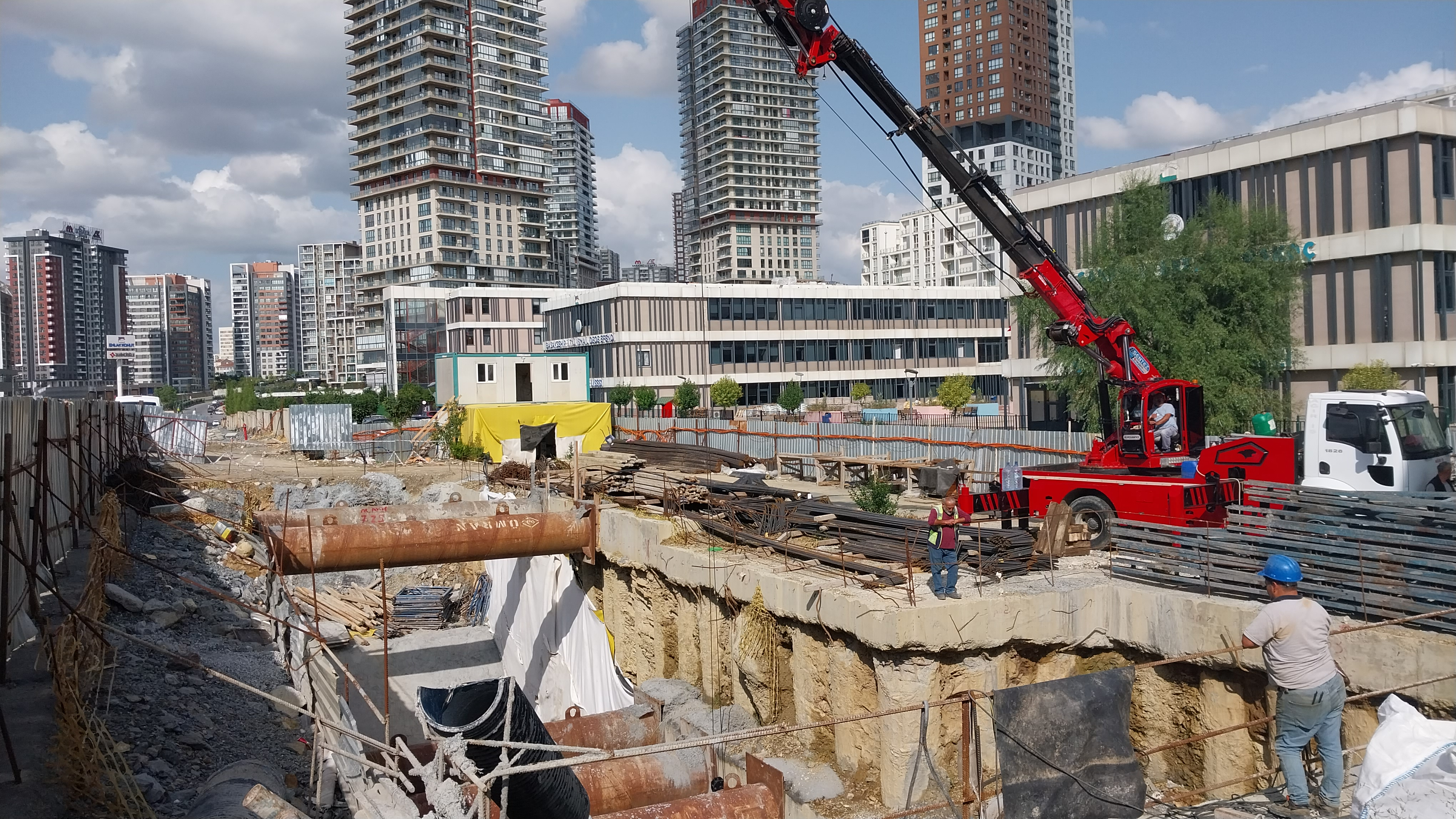
Construction of the station entrance (October 2023)

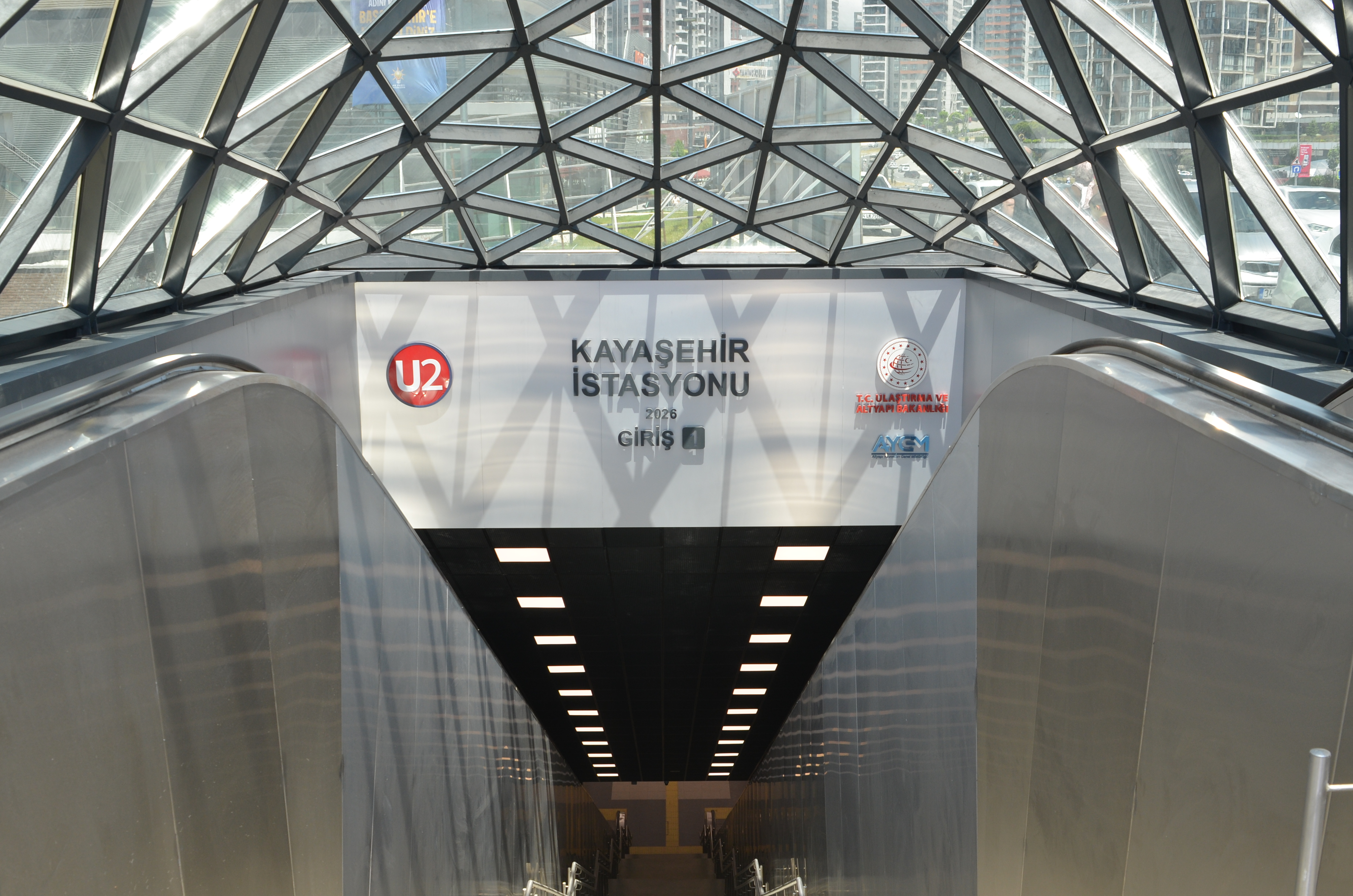
Entrance 1

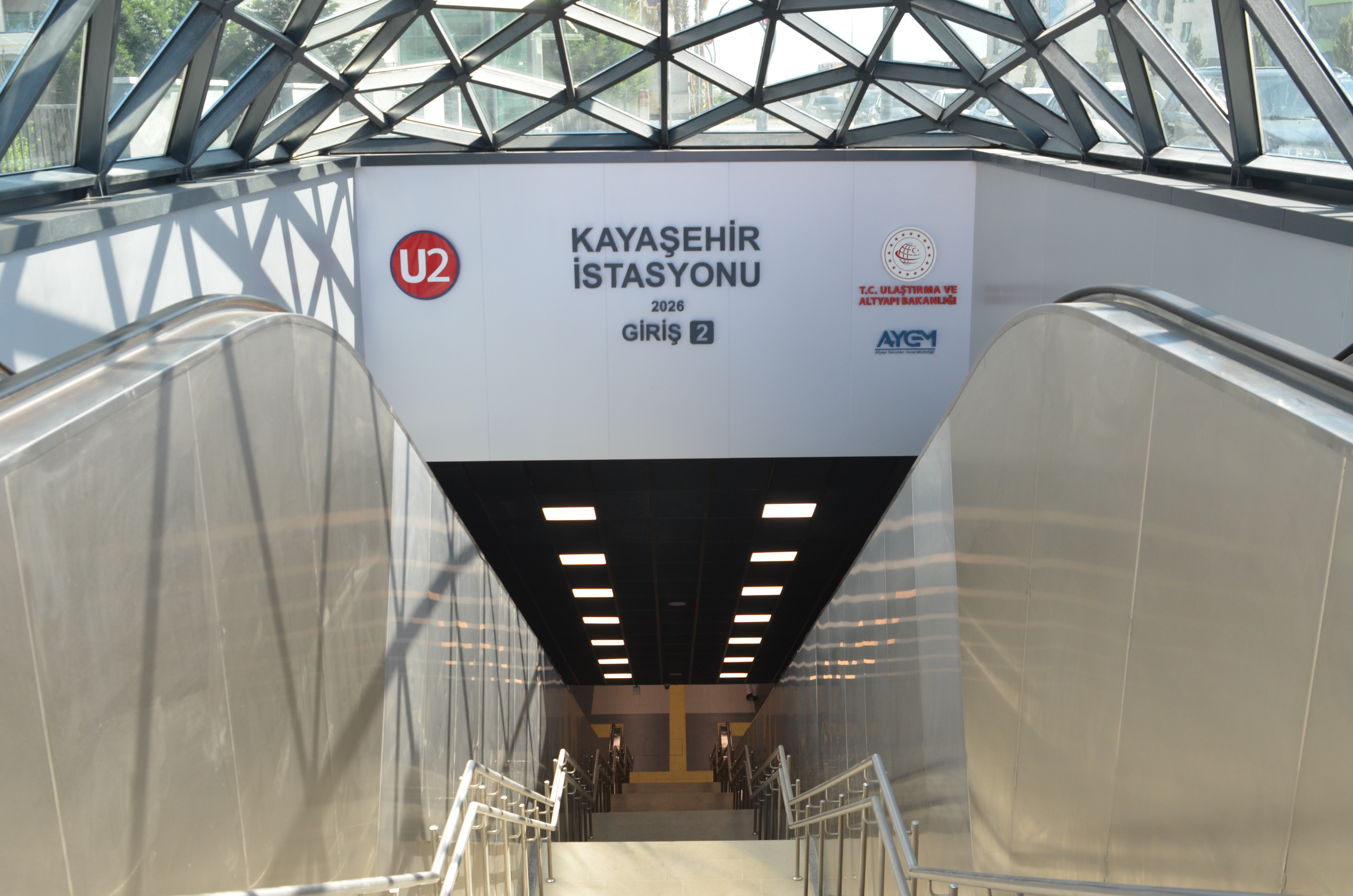
Entrance 2

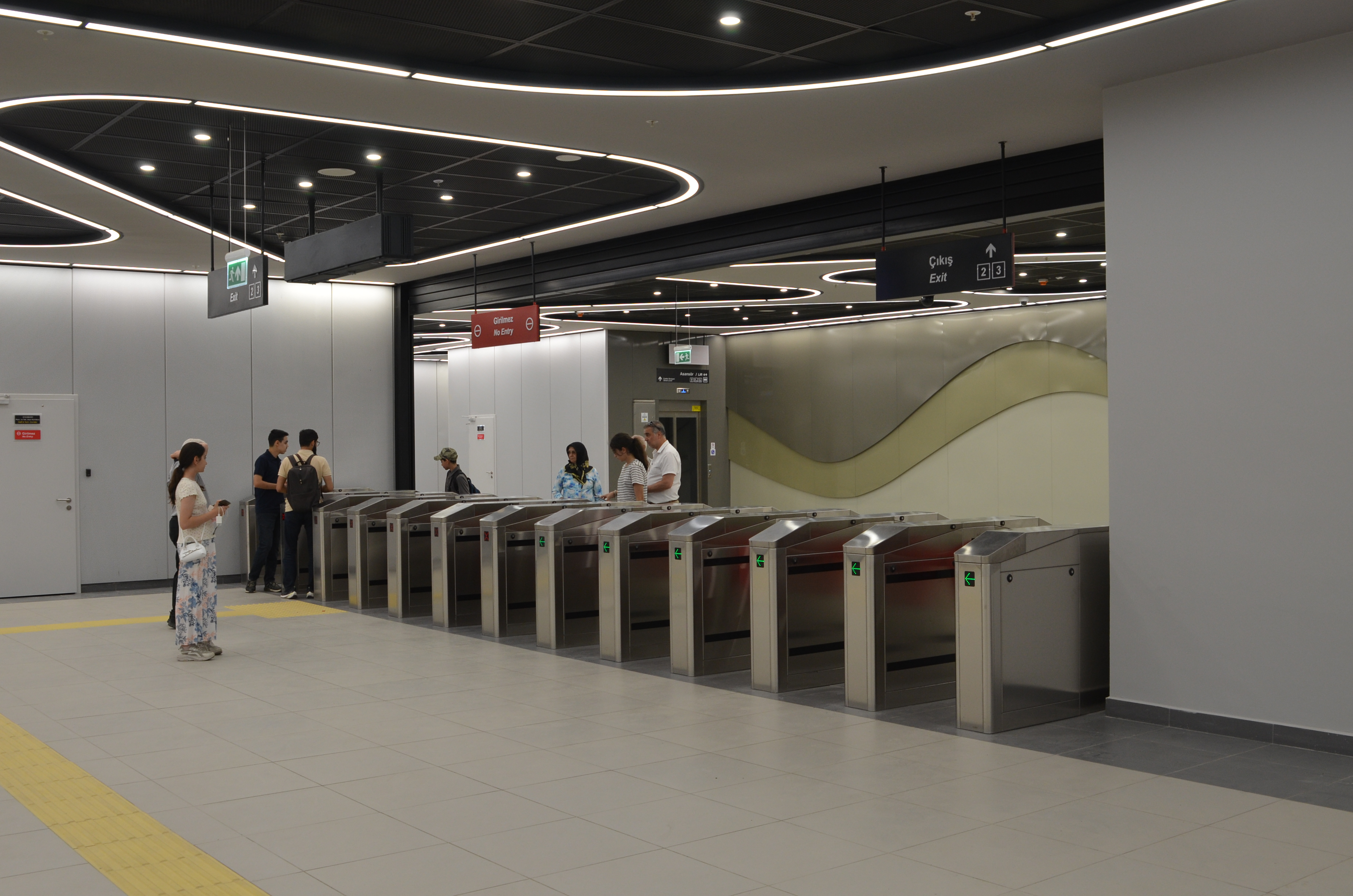
Ticket hall

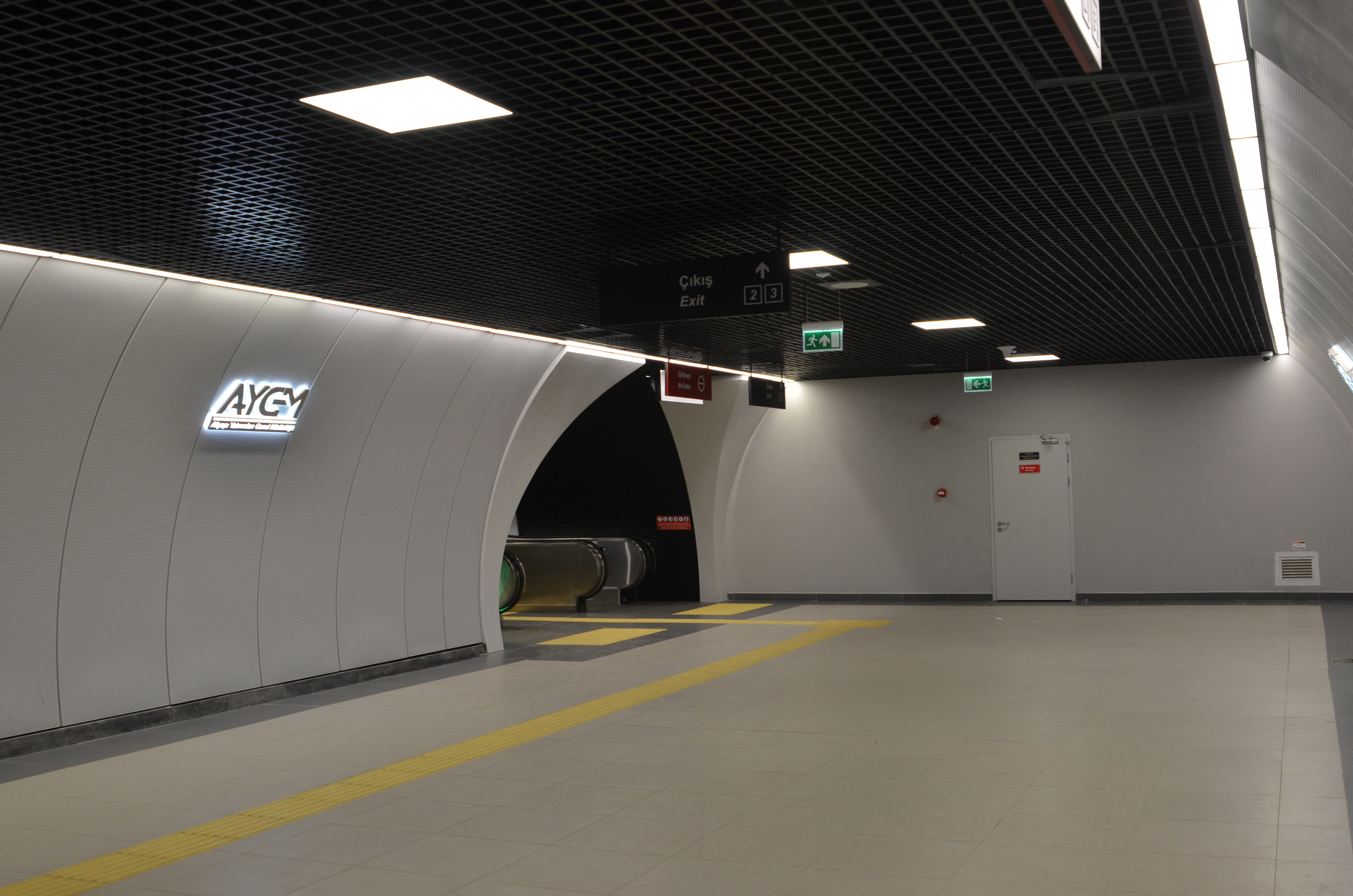
Mezzanine

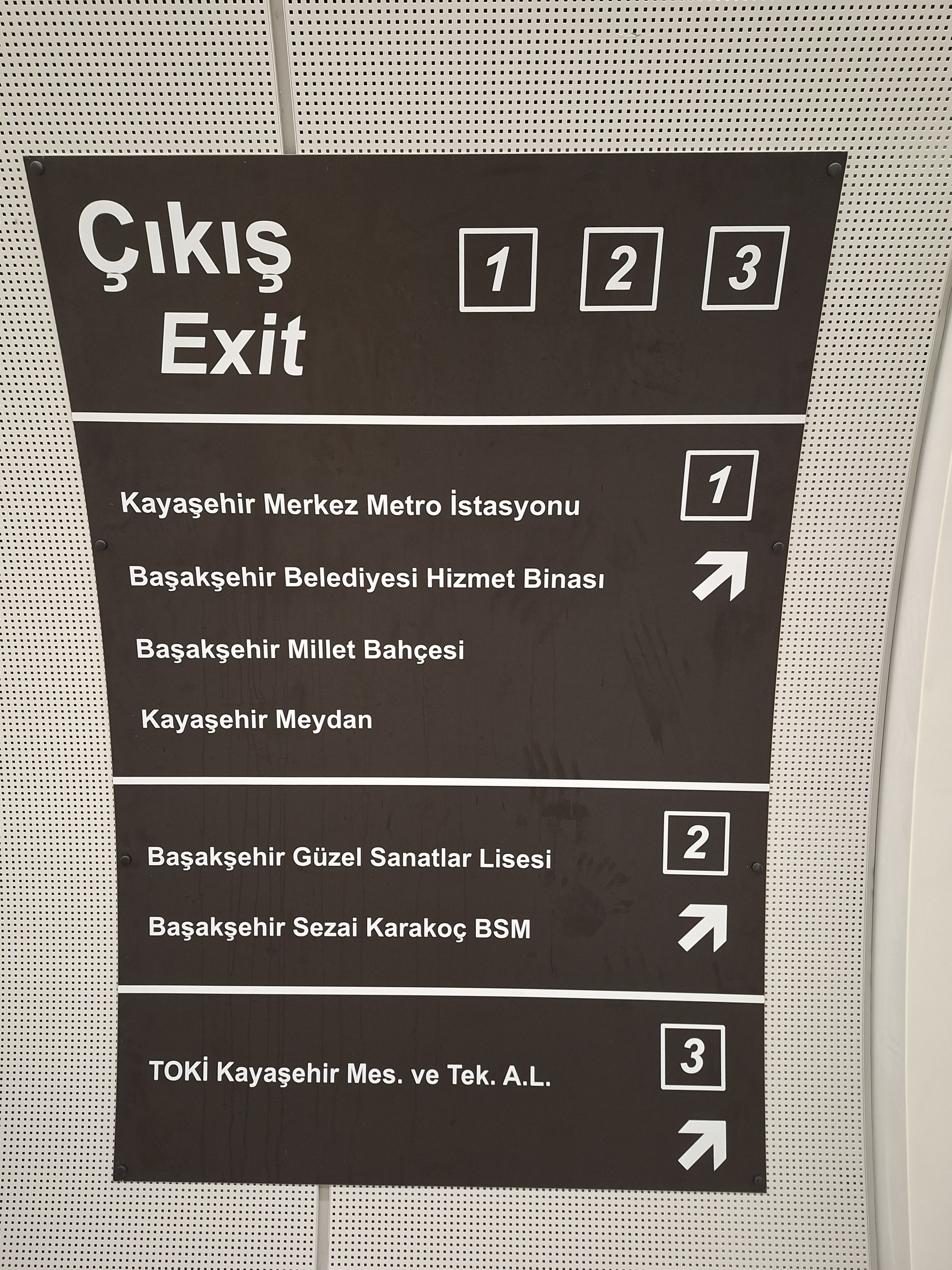
Exit sign

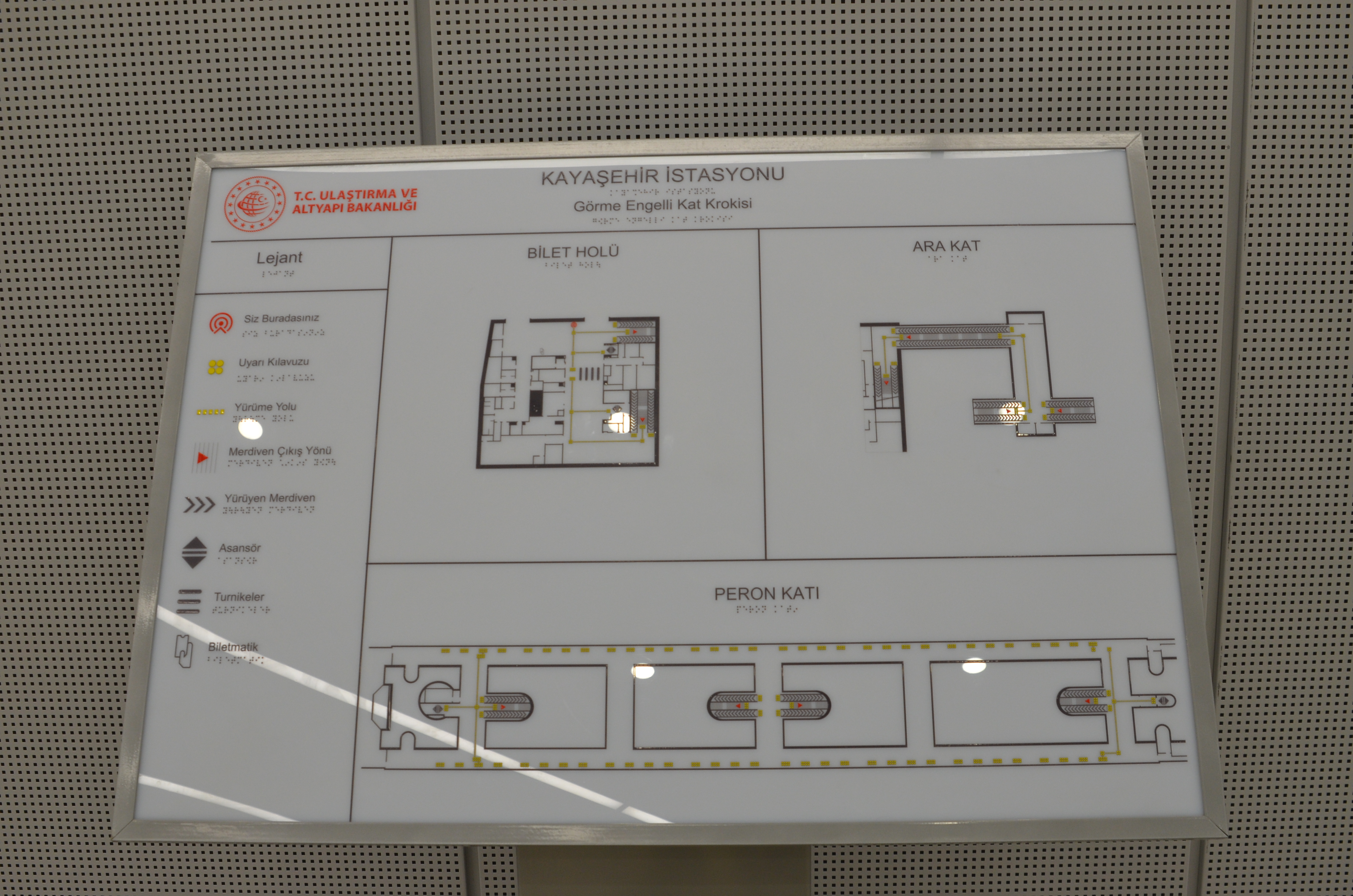
Station diagram (Entrance 1)

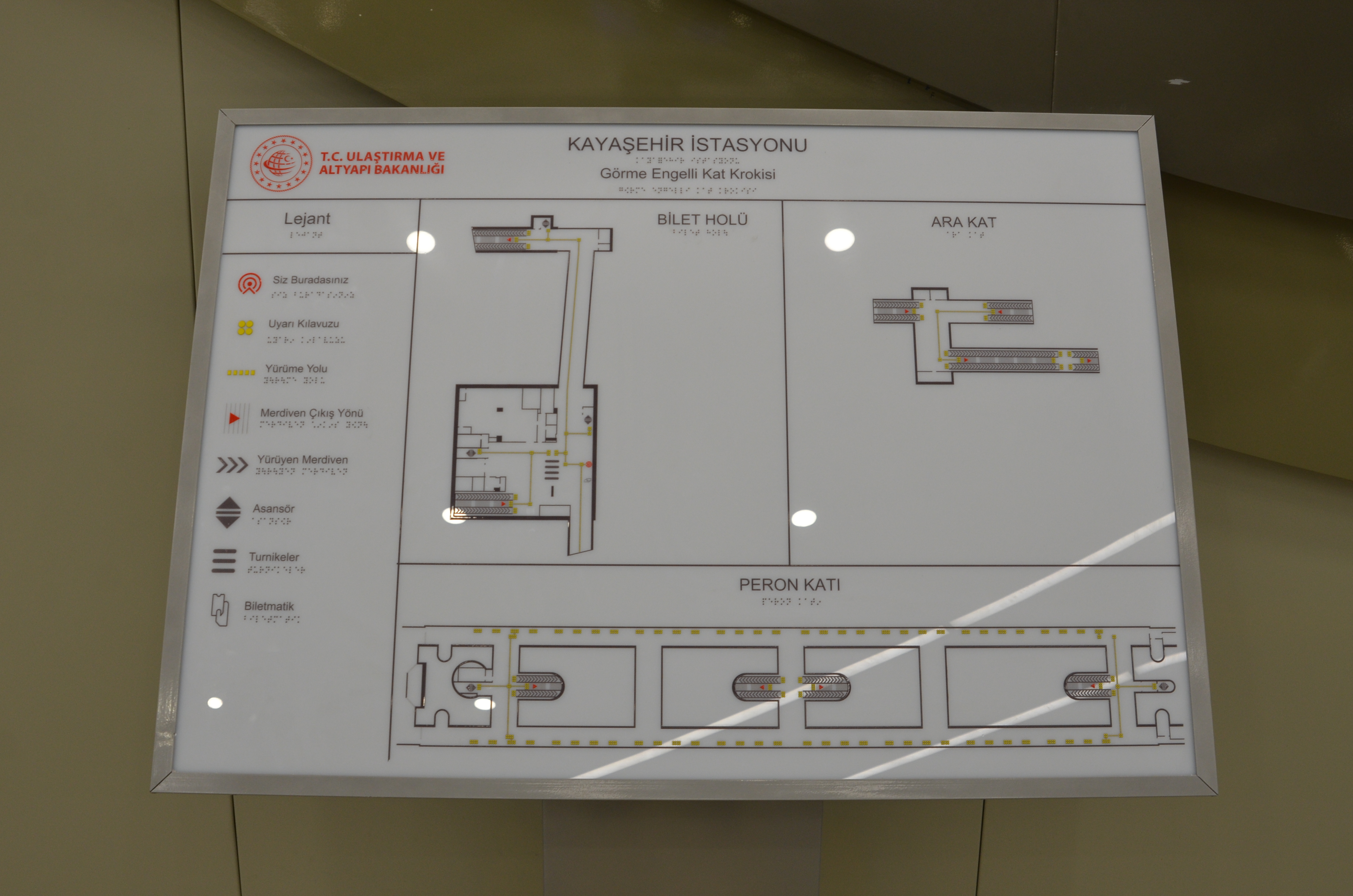
Station diagram (Entrances 2 and 3)

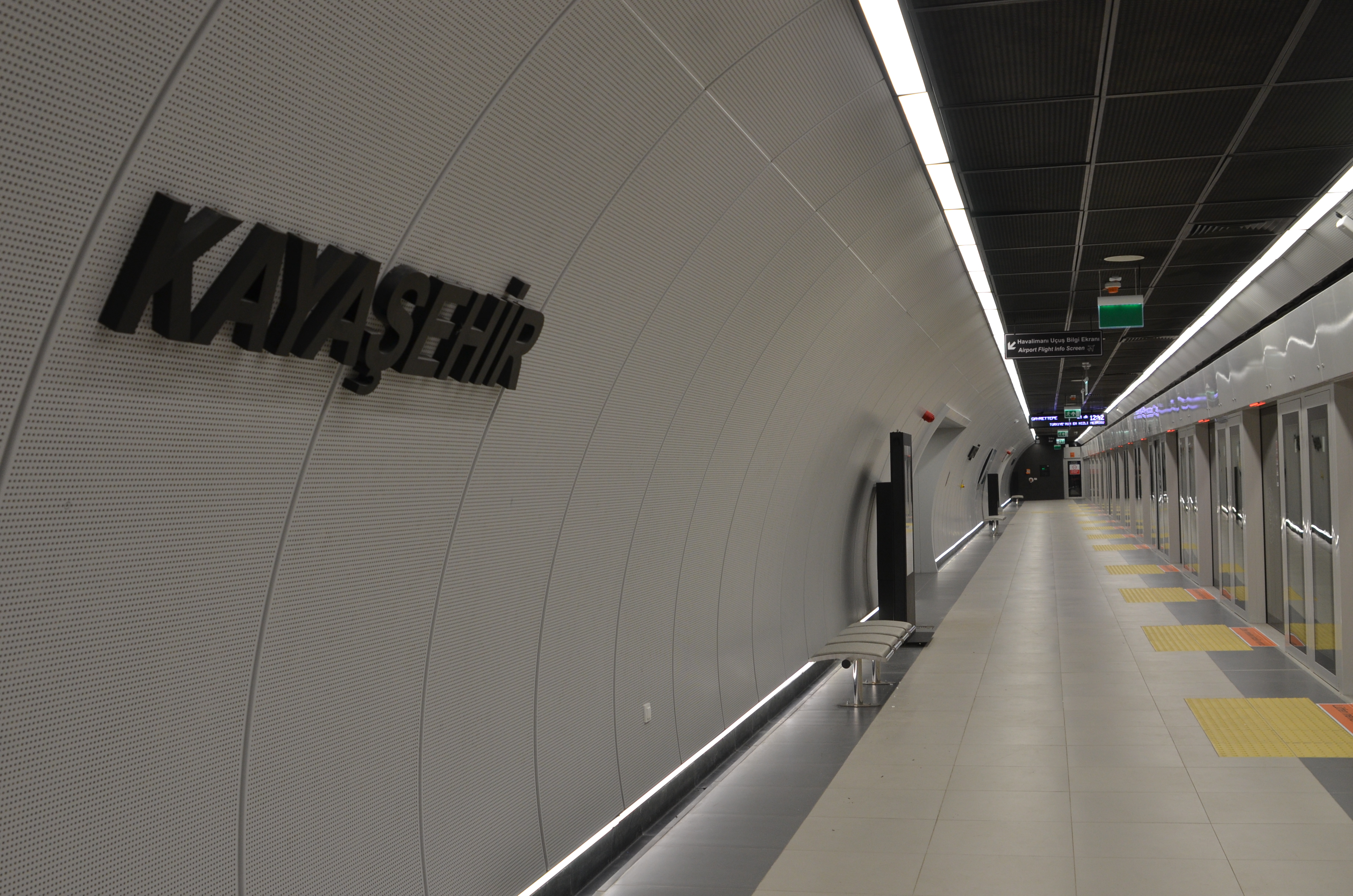
Platform (towards Gayrettepe)
