= Tiaret District =

- District
- Country: Algeria
- Province: Tébessa Province
- Chief town: Tiaret

Area
  - Total: 43.03 sq mi (111.45 km^{2})

Population (2008)
  - Total: 201,263
- Time zone: UTC+1 (CET)

Tiaret district is an Algerian administrative district located in the Province of Tiaret. Its chief town is located on the eponymous town of Tiaret.

The district is further divided into 1 municipality:

- Tiaret
