= Ibn Khaldoun University of Tiaret =

University in Algeria

Coordinates: 35°21′03″N 1°18′52″E

Ibn Khaldoun University Tiaret
- جامعة ابن خلدون
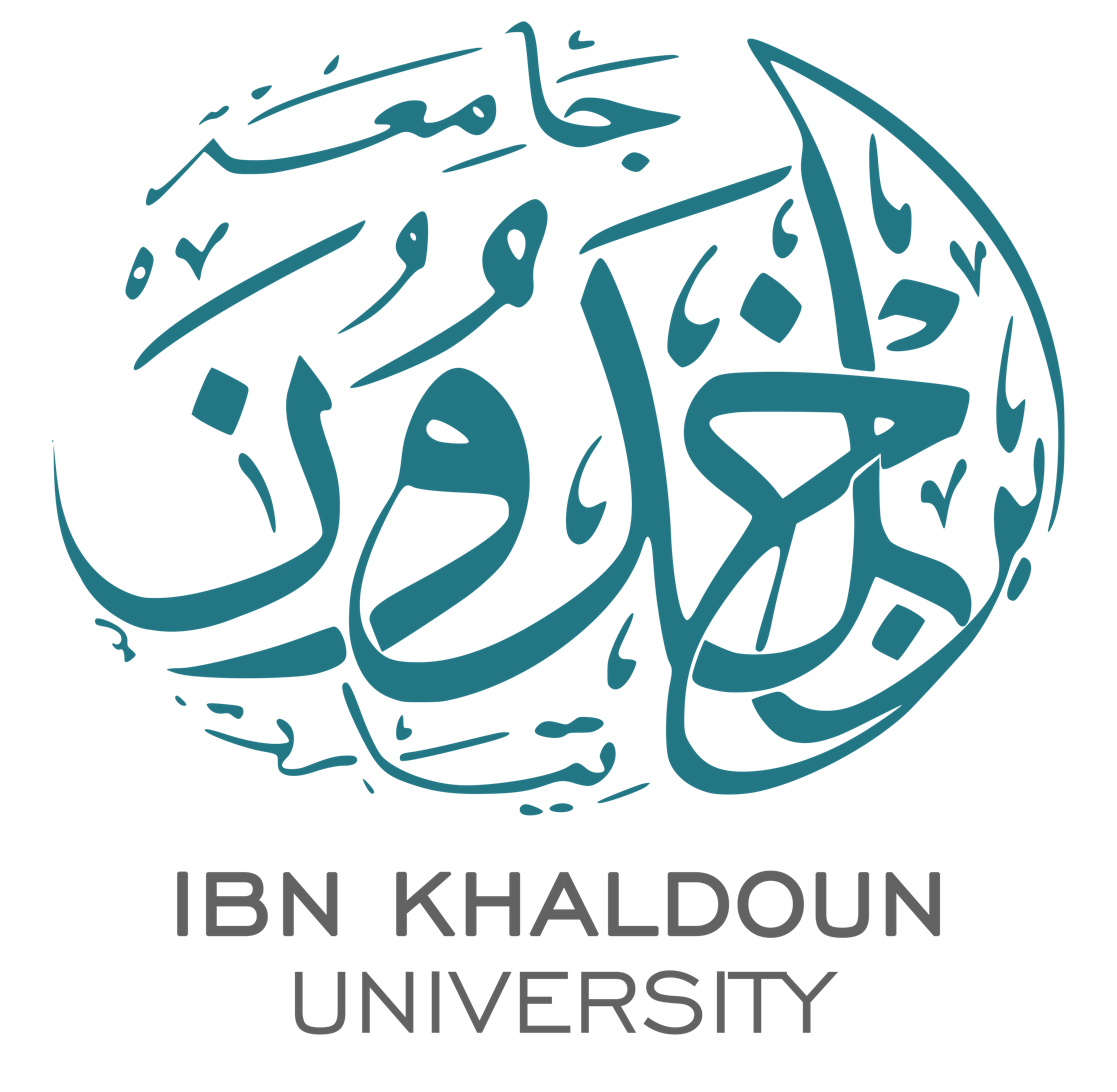
- Type: Public university
- Students: 32,244
- Website: Official website

Ibn Khaldoun University of Tiaret is a university located in Tiaret, Algeria. It was established in 1980.

In 2022, the university was ranked 15th in the national ranking of universities established by the Ministry of Higher Education and Scientific Research in Algeria.

== Faculties ==
The university has eight faculties:

- Faculty of Applied Sciences
- Faculty of Material Sciences
- Faculty of Mathematics and Computer Science
- Faculty of Natural and Life Sciences
- Faculty of Law and Political Science
- Faculty of Economics, Commerce, and Management Sciences
- Faculty of Humanities and Social Sciences
- Faculty of Letters and Languages

== Institutes ==
- Institute of Veterinary Sciences
- Institute of Technology

== Vice-rectorates ==
- Vice-rectorate for First and Second Cycle Higher Education, Continuing Education, Diplomas, and Graduate Education
- Vice-rectorate for Third Cycle Higher Education, University Accreditation, Scientific Research, and Post-graduate Education
- Vice-rectorate for Development, Prospects, and Guidance
- Vice-rectorate for External Relations, Cooperation, Communication, and Scientific Events
