= Christoph K. Neumann =

German translator and university teacher

Christoph K. Neumann (born 2 April 1962) is a German Orientalist with a focus on Turkology.

== Life ==
Neumann was born on 2 April 1962 in Braunschweig. After graduating from the Wilhelm-Gymnasium in Braunschweig in 1979, he studied Ottoman studies, Turkology, German studies and political science at LMU Munich (MA 1987) and the Ege University in İzmir. In 1992, he was appointed Dr. Ing. phil. PhD. In 1993 he received the prize of the Southeast European Society Munich. In 2006, he received habilitation at LMU Munich in Recent History.

His first scientific posts were at the Charles University in Prague, the Orient Institute in Istanbul and the Boğaziçi University in Istanbul. From 1998 to 2002 he was an assistant professor at Istanbul Technical University, and from 2002 to 2006 at Istanbul Bilgi University. In 2006, he became associate professor at Istanbul Bilgi University, and in 2008 professor of Turkology at the Institute for the Near and Middle East of LMU Munich.

He researches the history and culture of Turkey and the Ottoman Empire. Neumann is the author, publisher and translator of several books on the subject. He has received several scholarships, including from the Studienstiftung des Deutschen Volkes and the Deutsche Forschungsgemeinschaft. Neumann advised Kindler's New Literature Lexicon in Turkish literature and worked for the Turkology Gazette from 1984 to 1993. He was also on the Advisory and Editorial Board of scientific journals. Neumann is also co-author of numerous guides to Turkey and translator of the novel Snow by Orhan Pamuk.

== Selected works ==
- Das indirekte Argument. Ein Plädoyer für die Tanẓīmāt vermittels der Historie. Die geschichtliche Bedeutung von Aḥmed Cevdet Paşas Taʾrīẖ (= Periplus Parerga. Band 1). Lit, Münster u. a. 1994, ISBN 3-89473-910-X (= Dissertation).
- with Klaus Kreiser: Kleine Geschichte der Türkei. Reclam, Stuttgart 2003, ISBN 3-15-010540-4. (2. Auflage, 2009)
