= Ibn Haldun University =

Private foundation university in Basaksehir, İstanbul, Turkey

- Turkish: İbn Haldun Üniversitesi
- Motto: Fikri Bağımsızlık (Turkish)
- Motto in English: Intellectual Sovereignty
- Type: Private (Non-profit)
- Established: 2015; 11 years ago
- Affiliations: CoHE; Bologna Process; Erasmus Programme; FIBAA
- President: Prof. Dr. İrfan Gündüz
- Rector: Atilla Arkan
- Location: Başakşehir, Istanbul
- Language: English, Turkish and Arabic
- Campuses: Başakşehir; Süleymaniye; Bakırköy
- Colors: Crimson Blue
- Website: https://www.ihu.edu.tr/en

Ibn Haldun University (Turkish: İbn Haldun Üniversitesi) or abbreviated as IHU, is a private foundation university located in Başakşehir, Istanbul. The university has a strong focus on the humanities and social sciences, and espouses a multilingual approach to education, namely in Turkish, English and Arabic.

== History ==
IHU was established by the Turkish Youth and Education Service Foundation, set up by Recep Tayyip Erdoğan in 1996 when he was Mayor of Istanbul Metropolitan Municipality. The current rector is Prof. Dr. Atilla Arkan, who took over from his predecessor, the founding rector and president of IHU, Prof. Dr. Recep Şentürk in 2021. In December 2019, IHU set up a four-year project to improve the understanding of the work of Al-Tirmidhi. It also held a seminar to celebrate the work of Fuat Sezgin.

== Campus ==
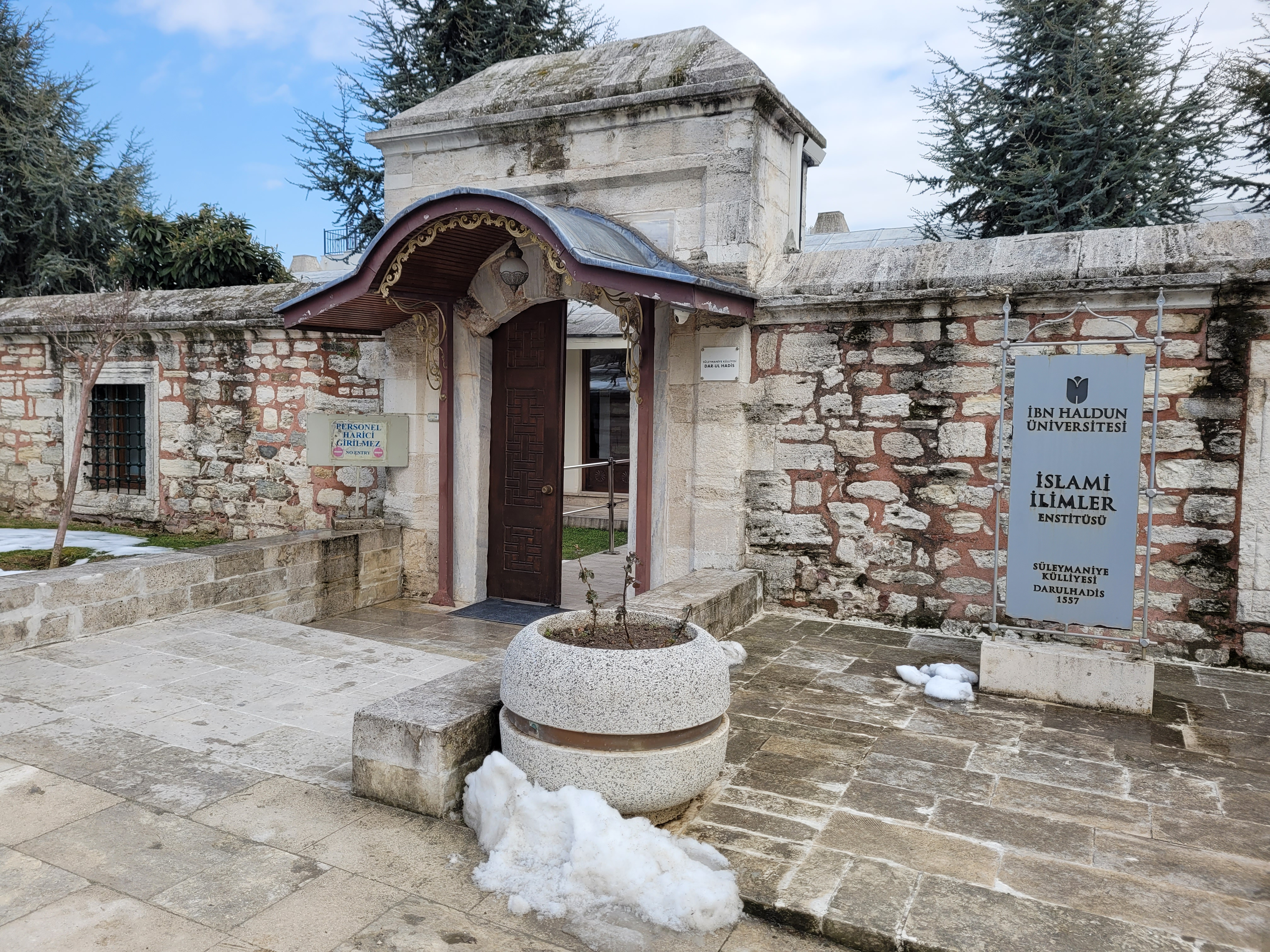
Ibn Haldun University Süleymaniye Campus

The university is located in Başakșehir, in the western outskirts of Istanbul, where a new campus opened in the fall of 2020. It also has a campus besides the Süleymaniye Mosque in Fatih, which houses the Alliance of Civilizations Institute (Turkish: MEDIT) and Islamic Studies department.

== Schools ==
- School of Law
- School of Business
- School of Education
- School of Islamic Studies
- School of Communication
- School of the Humanities and Social Sciences

The various languages of instruction of Ibn Haldun University are Turkish, English, and Arabic, and are under the remit of the School of Languages.

== Academic activities ==
The school of humanities and social sciences include the following departments:

- Department of History
- Department of Sociology
- Department of Economics
- Department of Psychology
- Department of Comparative Literature
- Department of Political Science and International Relations

=== Institutes of the University ===
- Medeniyetler İttifakı Enstitüsü (English: Alliance of Civilizations Institute)
- Educational Science Institute
- Social Sciences Institute

== Notable faculty ==
- Recep Şentürk — Turkish sociologist
- Suraiya Faroqhi — German historian
- Halil Berktay — Turkish historian
- Heba Raouf Ezzat — Egyptian academic, writer and activist
