= Toplu Konutlar station =

Station of the Istanbul Metro

Toplu Konutlar
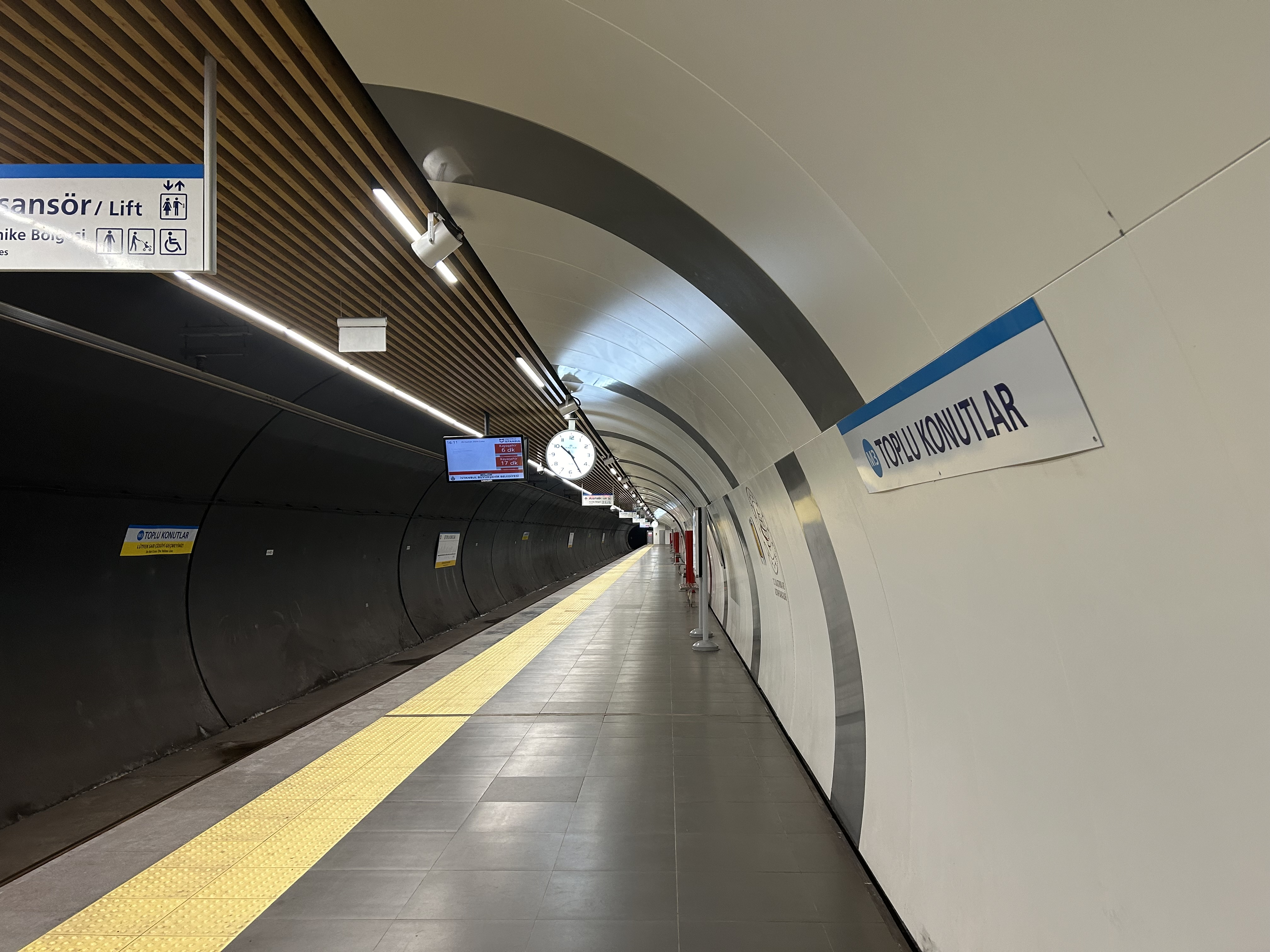

General information
- Location: Kayabaşı Neighborhood, Kayaşehir Boulevard 34494; Başakşehir, Istanbul; Turkey
- Coordinates: 41°6′26″N 28°46′5″E
- System: Istanbul Metro rapid transit station
- Owner: Istanbul Metropolitan Municipality
- Line: M3
- Platforms: 1 Island platform
- Tracks: 2
- Connections: İETT Bus: 36AS, 78E,78G, 78Ş, 79B, 79C, 79E, 79F, 79G, 79K, 79KM, 79KT, 79T, 79Y, MK11; Istanbul Minibus: Forum İstanbul - Kayaşehir

Construction
- Structure type: Underground
- Parking: No
- Cycle facilities: Yes
- Accessible: Yes

History
- Opened: 8 April 2023 (3 years ago)
- Electrified: 1,500 V DC Overhead line

Services
Preceding station	Istanbul Metro	Following station
Kayaşehir Merkez Terminus	M3 Line	Şehir Hastanesi towards Bakırköy Sahil
Location

Toplu Konutlar is an underground rapid transit station on the M3 line of the Istanbul Metro. It is located on Kayaşehir Boulevard in the Kayabaşı district of Başakşehir. It was opened on 8 April 2023 with the Onurkent-Kayaşehir Merkez expansion built by the Ministry of Transport and Infrastructure.

== Layout ==
Northbound	← toward Kayaşehir Merkez (terminus)
Island platform, doors will open on the left
Southbound	toward Bakırköy Sahil (Şehir Hastanesi M3) →

== Operation information ==
The line operates between 06:00 and 00:00 and train frequency is 7 minutes at peak hours and 10 minutes at all other times. The line has no night service.

== Gallery ==
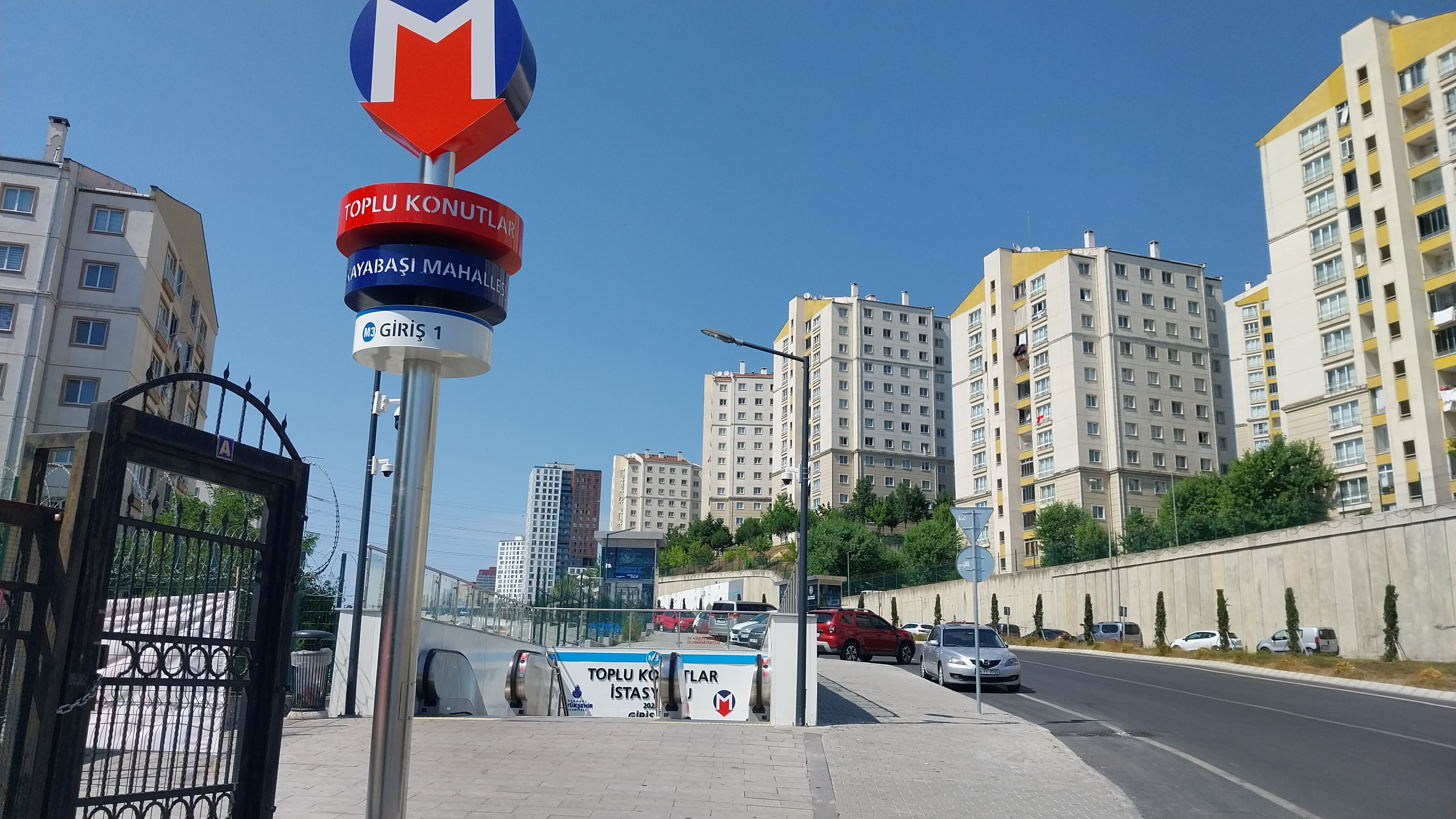
Totem

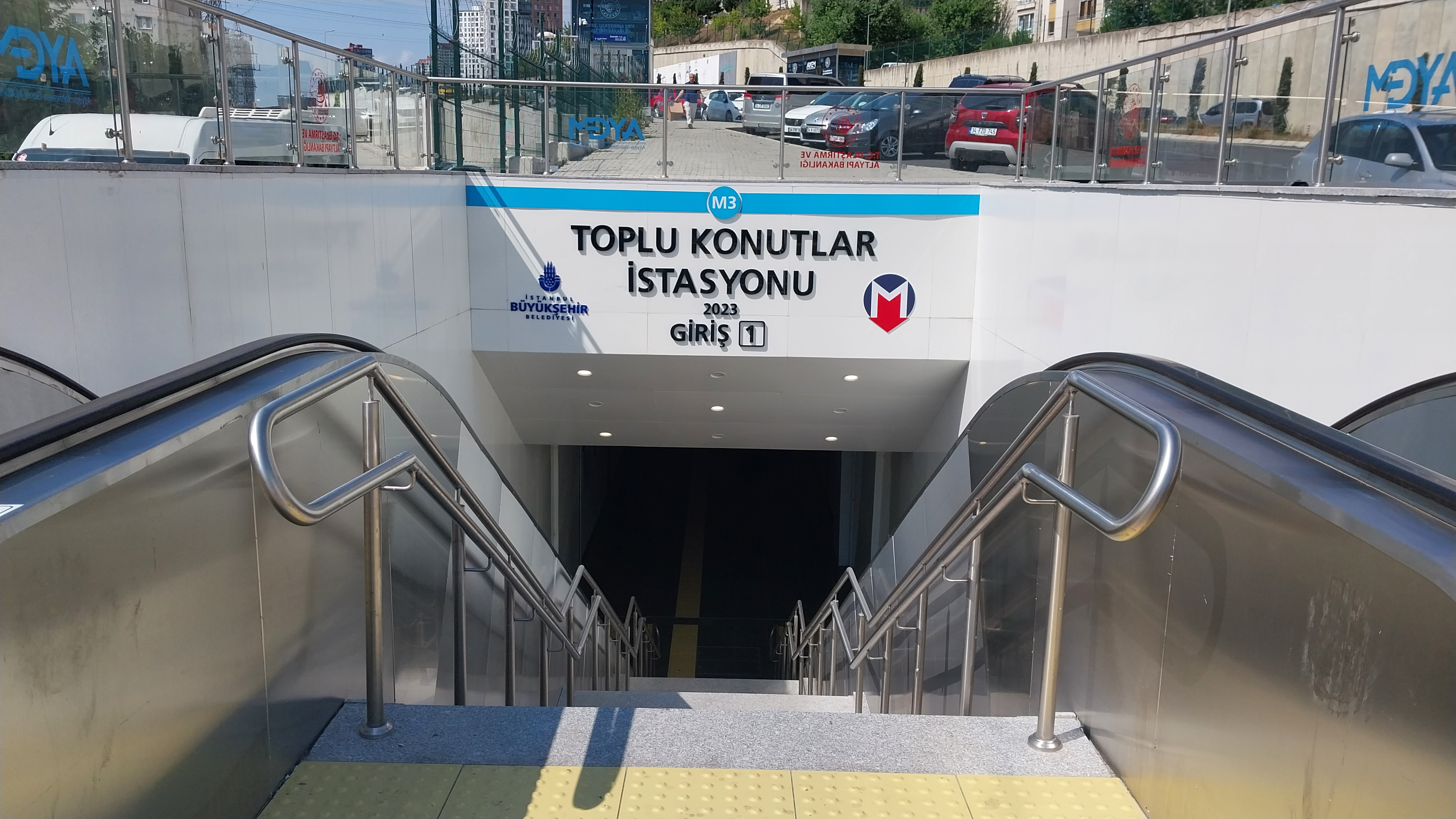
Entrance 1

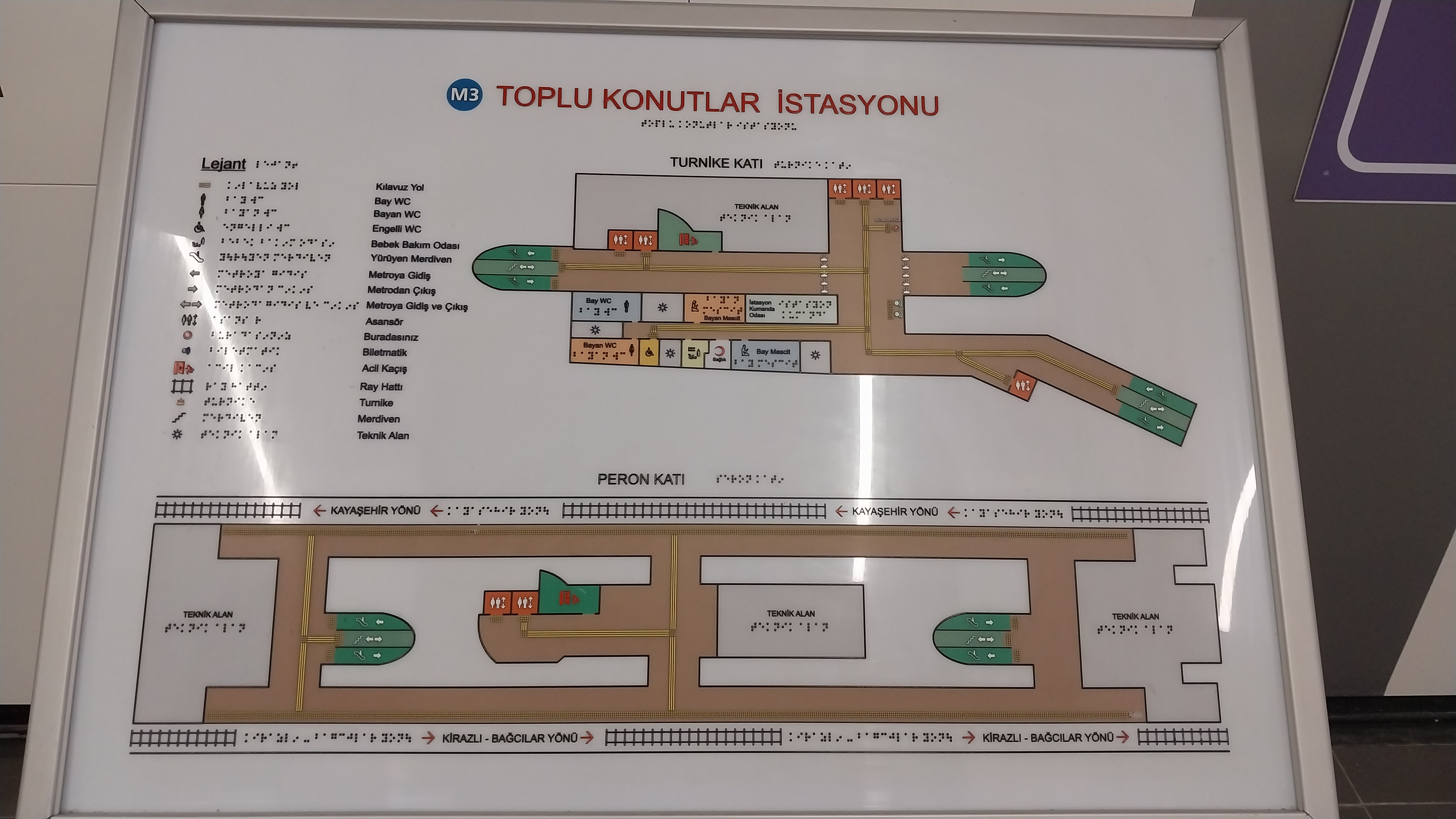
Station diagram

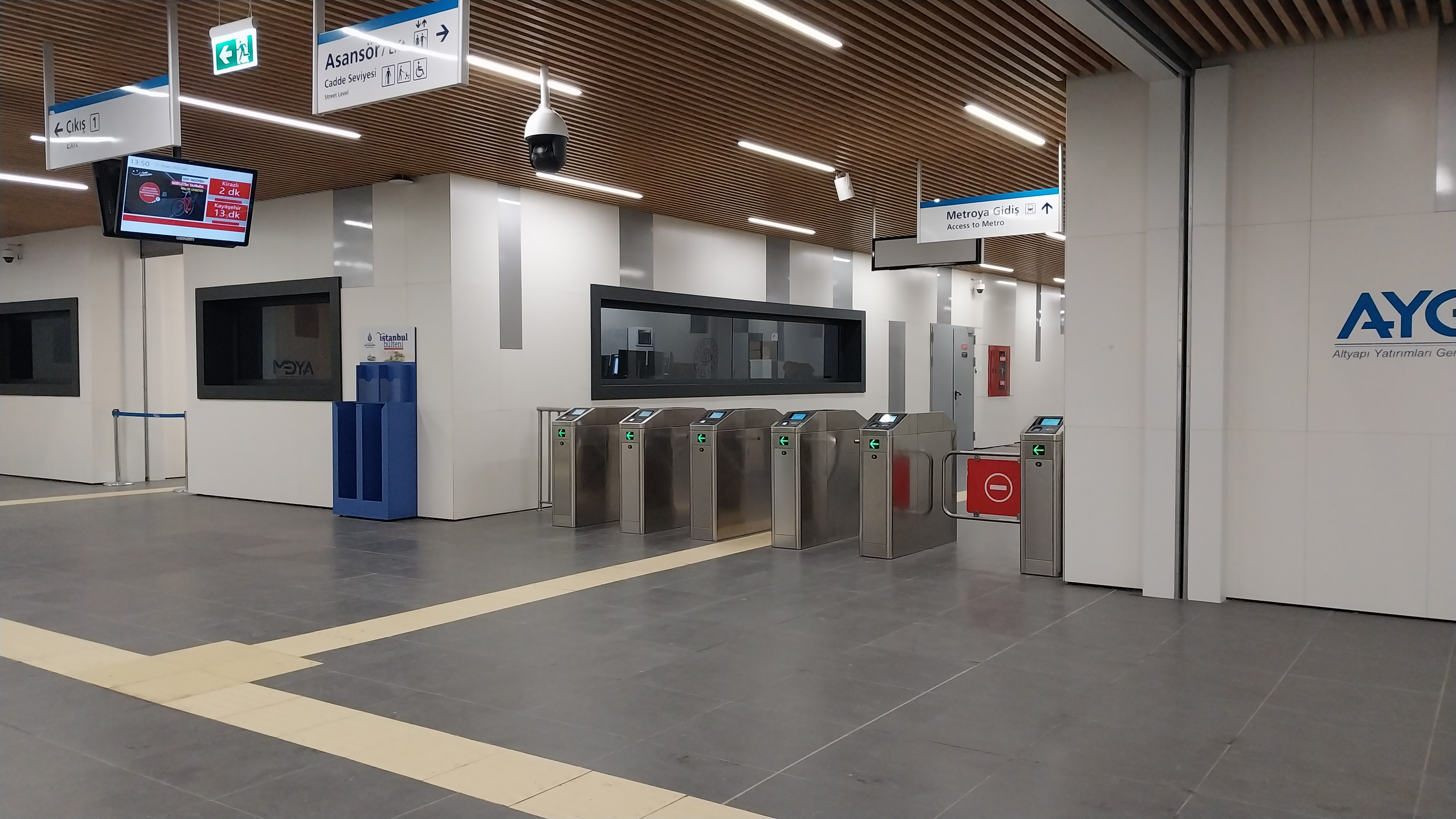
Ticket hall

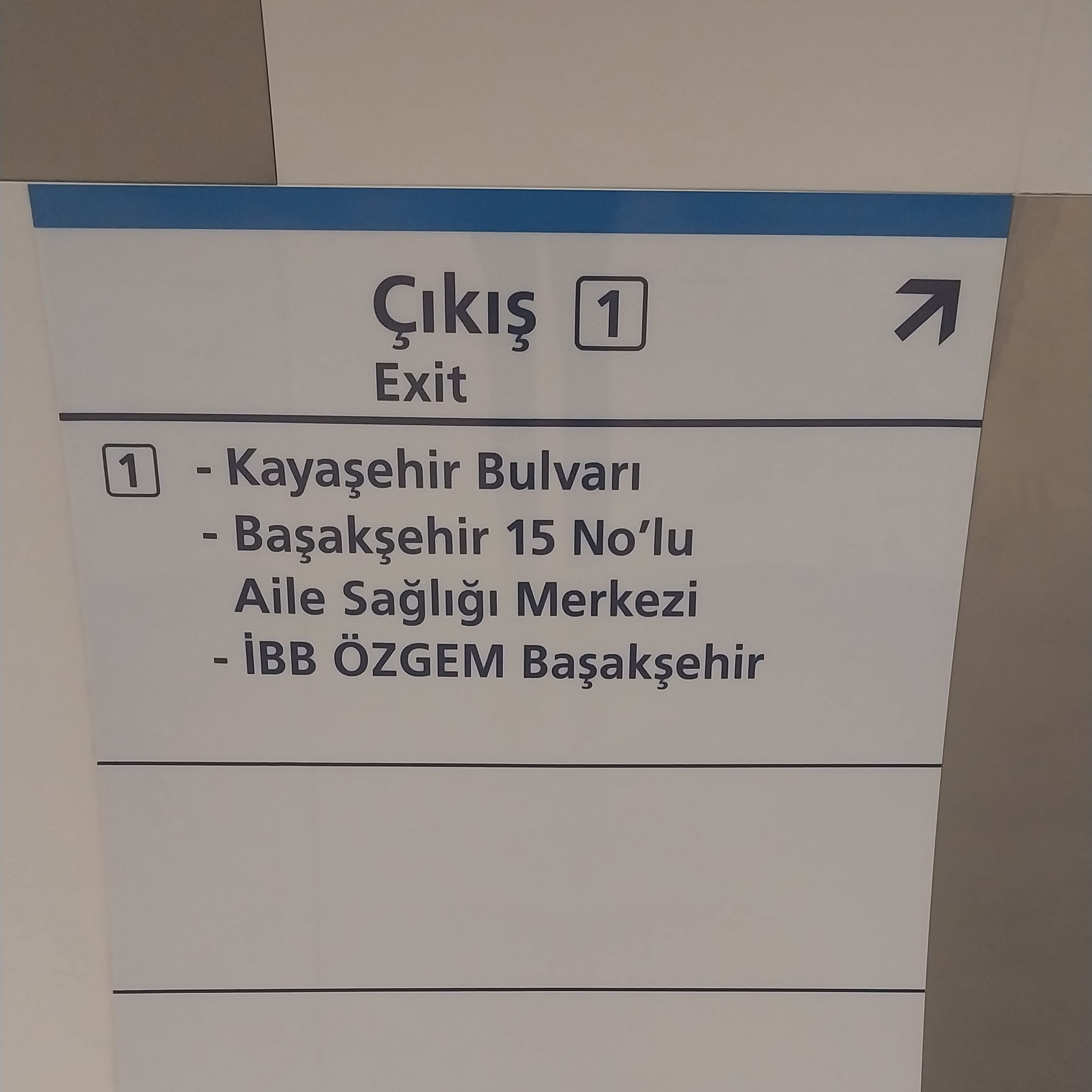
Exit sign

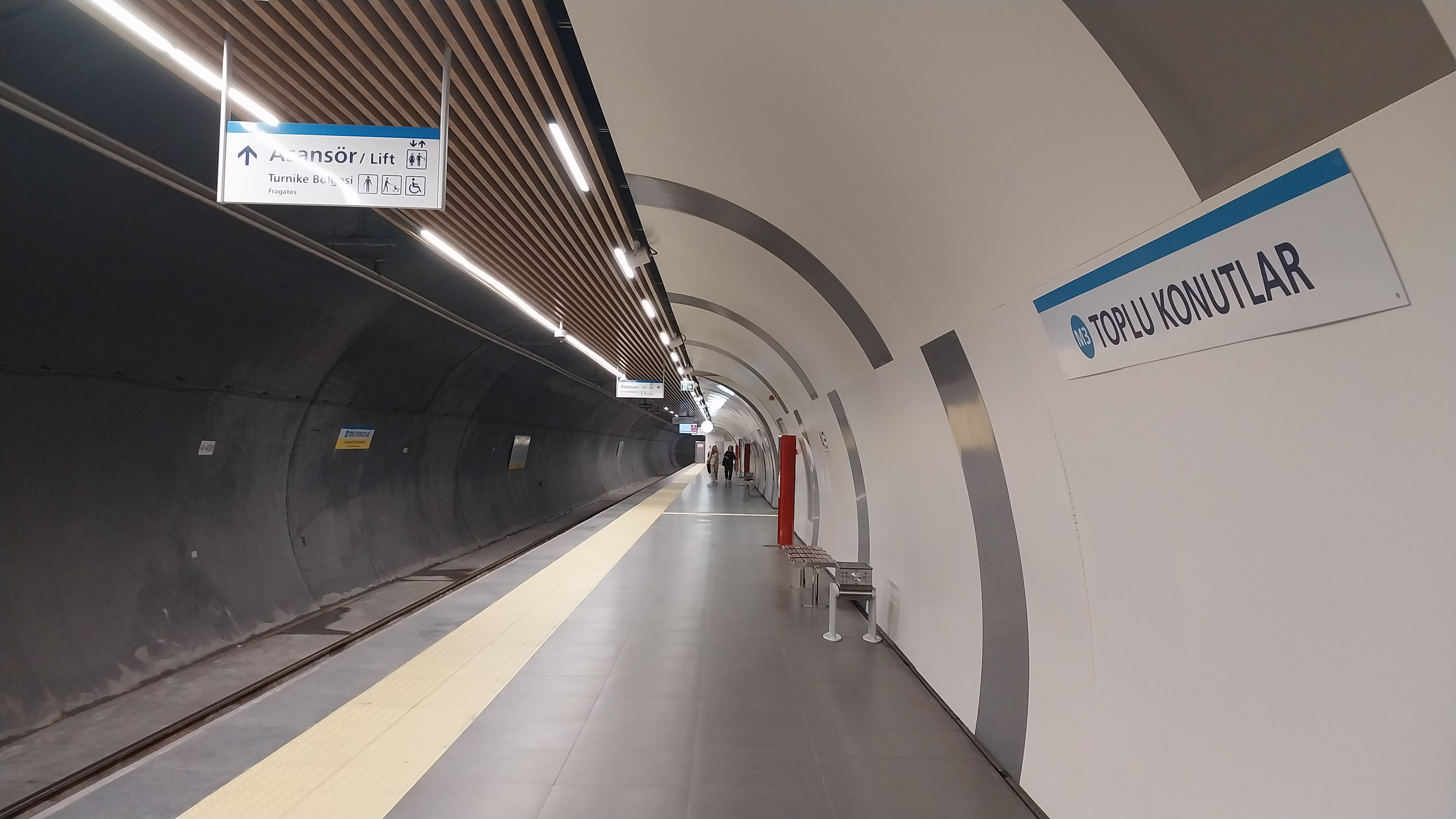
Platform
