= Şehir Hastanesi station =

Station of the Istanbul Metro

Şehir Hastanesi
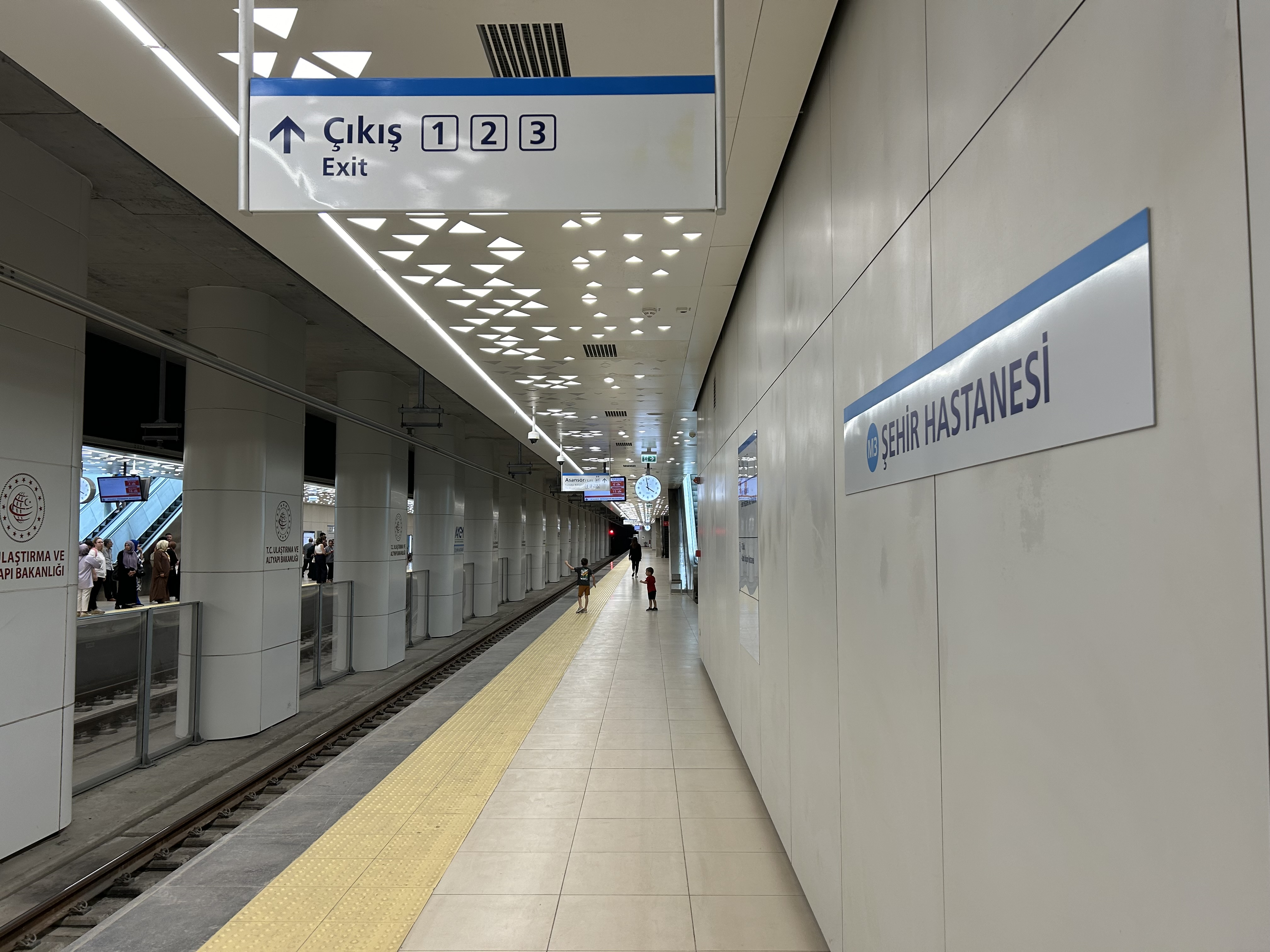

General information
- Location: Başakşehir Neighborhood, Olimpiyat Boulevard, 34480; Başakşehir, Istanbul; Turkey
- Coordinates: 41°6′12″N 28°46′39″E
- System: Istanbul Metro rapid transit station
- Owner: Istanbul Metropolitan Municipality
- Line: M3
- Platforms: 2 Side platforms
- Tracks: 2
- Connections: İETT Bus: 36F, 78E, 78F, 78Ş, 79B, 79E, 79F, 79FY, 79GE, 79KM, 79KT, 79T, 146BA, 146F, HS1, HS2, MK1, MK2, MK22, MR50; Istanbul Minibus: Küçükçekmece - Kayaşehir, Topkapı - Kayaşehir, Şirinevler - Kayaşehir, Otogar - Kayaşehir, Sefaköy - Kayaşehir

Construction
- Structure type: Underground
- Parking: No
- Cycle facilities: Yes
- Accessible: Yes

History
- Opened: 8 April 2023 (3 years ago)
- Electrified: 1,500 V DC Overhead line

Services
Preceding station	Istanbul Metro	Following station
Toplu Konutlar towards Kayaşehir Merkez	M3 Line	Onurkent towards Bakırköy Sahil
Location

Şehir Hastanesi is an underground rapid transit station on the M3 line of the Istanbul Metro. It is located on Olimpiyat Boulevard in Başakşehir. It was opened on 8 April 2023 with the Onurkent-Kayaşehir Merkez expansion built by the Ministry of Transport and Infrastructure.

== Layout ==
Side platform, doors will open on the right
Northbound	← toward Kayaşehir Merkez (Toplu Konutlar)
Southbound	toward Bakırköy Sahil (Onurkent) →
Side platform, doors will open on the right

== Operation information ==
The line operates between 06:00 and 00:00 and train frequency is 7 minutes at peak hours and 10 minutes at all other times. The line has no night service.

== Gallery ==
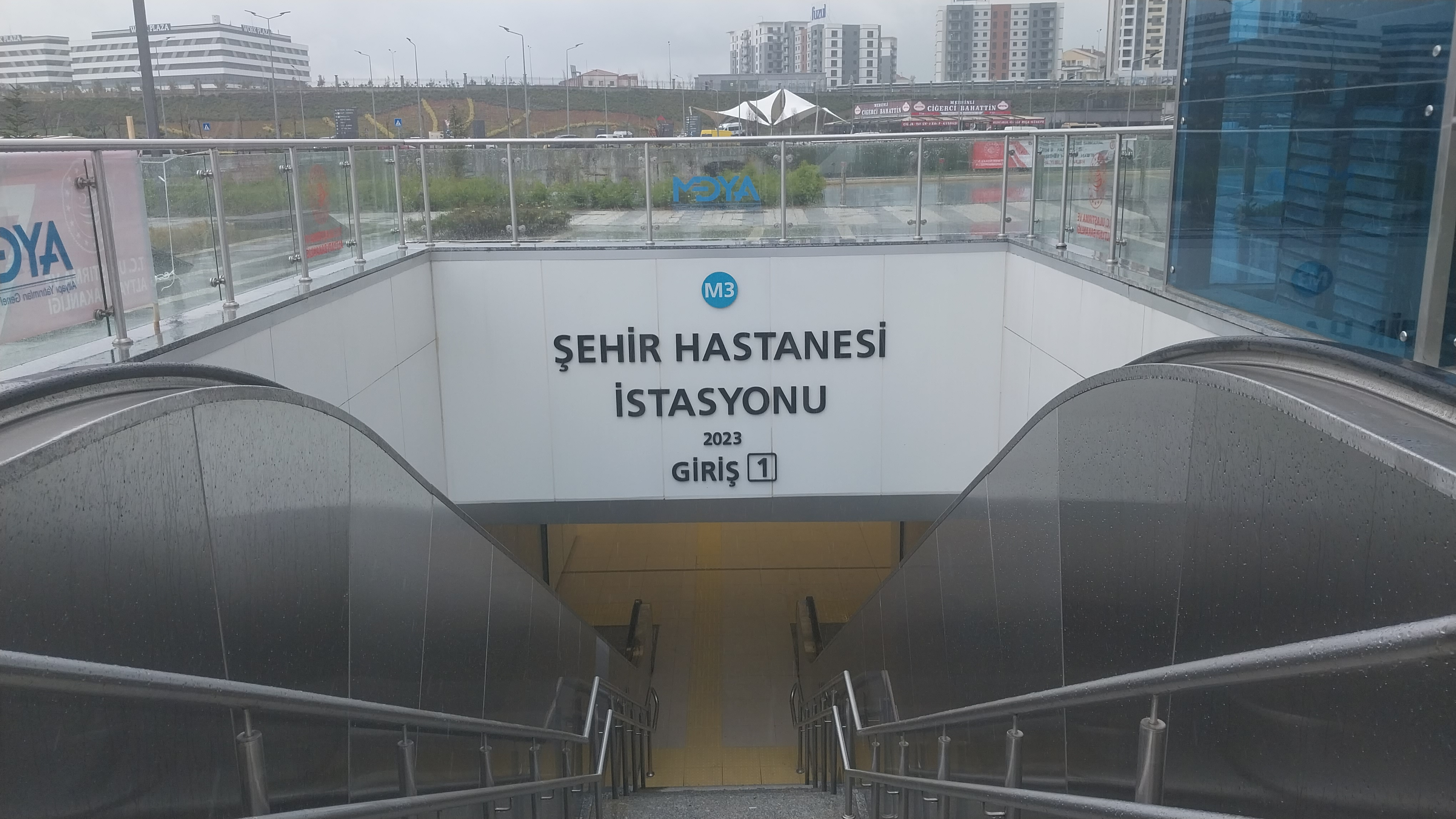
Entrance 1

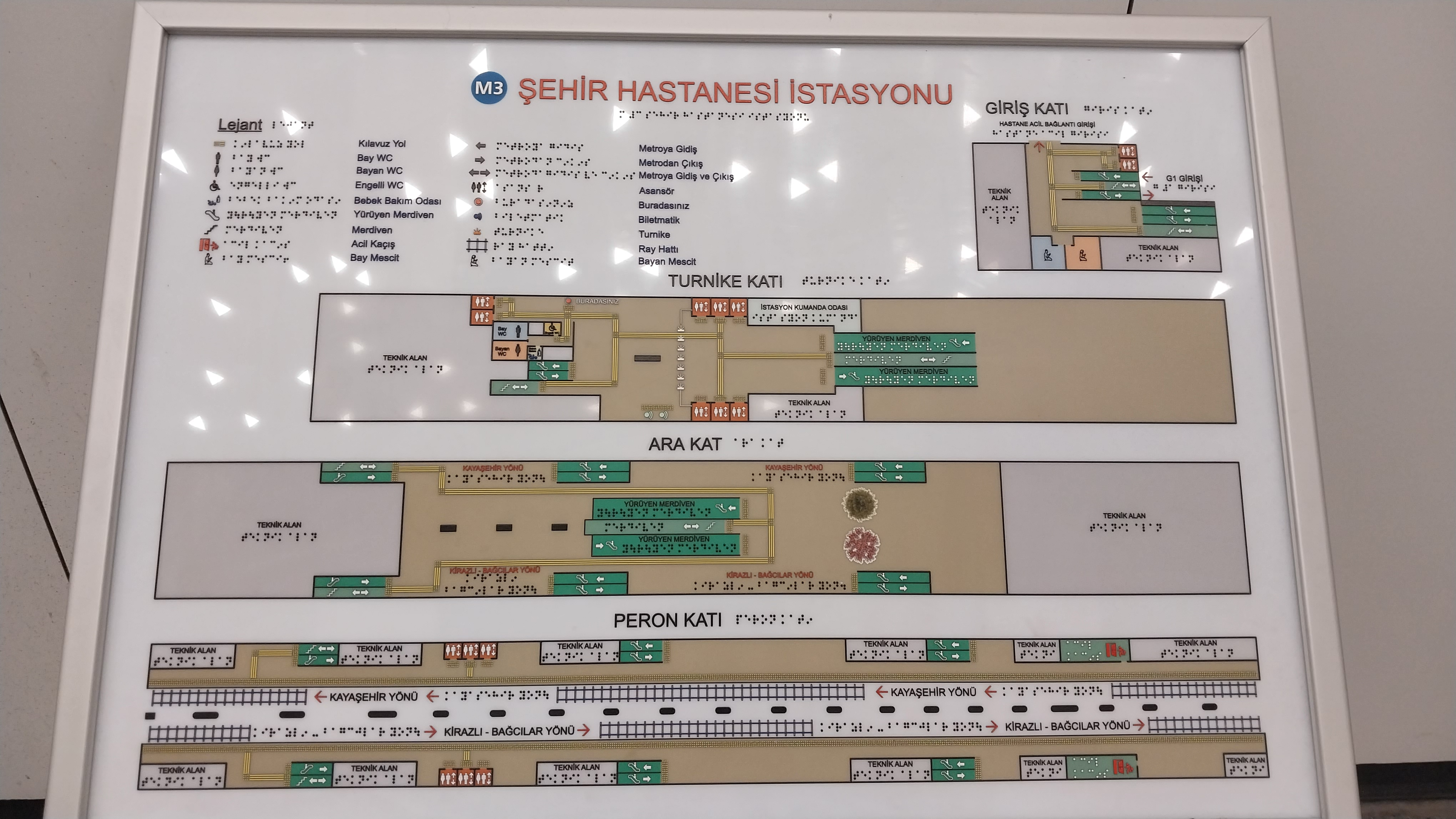
Station diagram

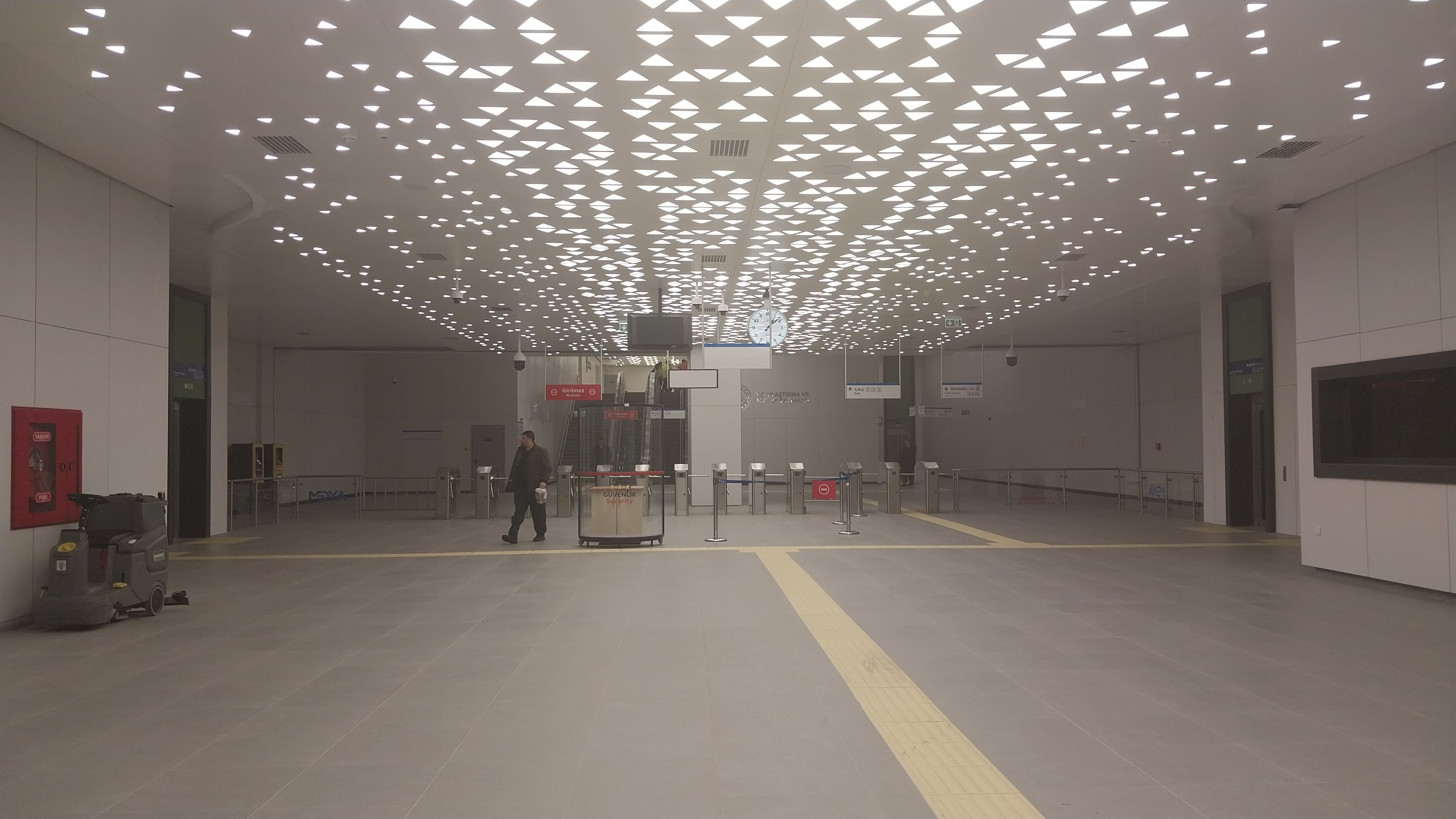
Ticket hall

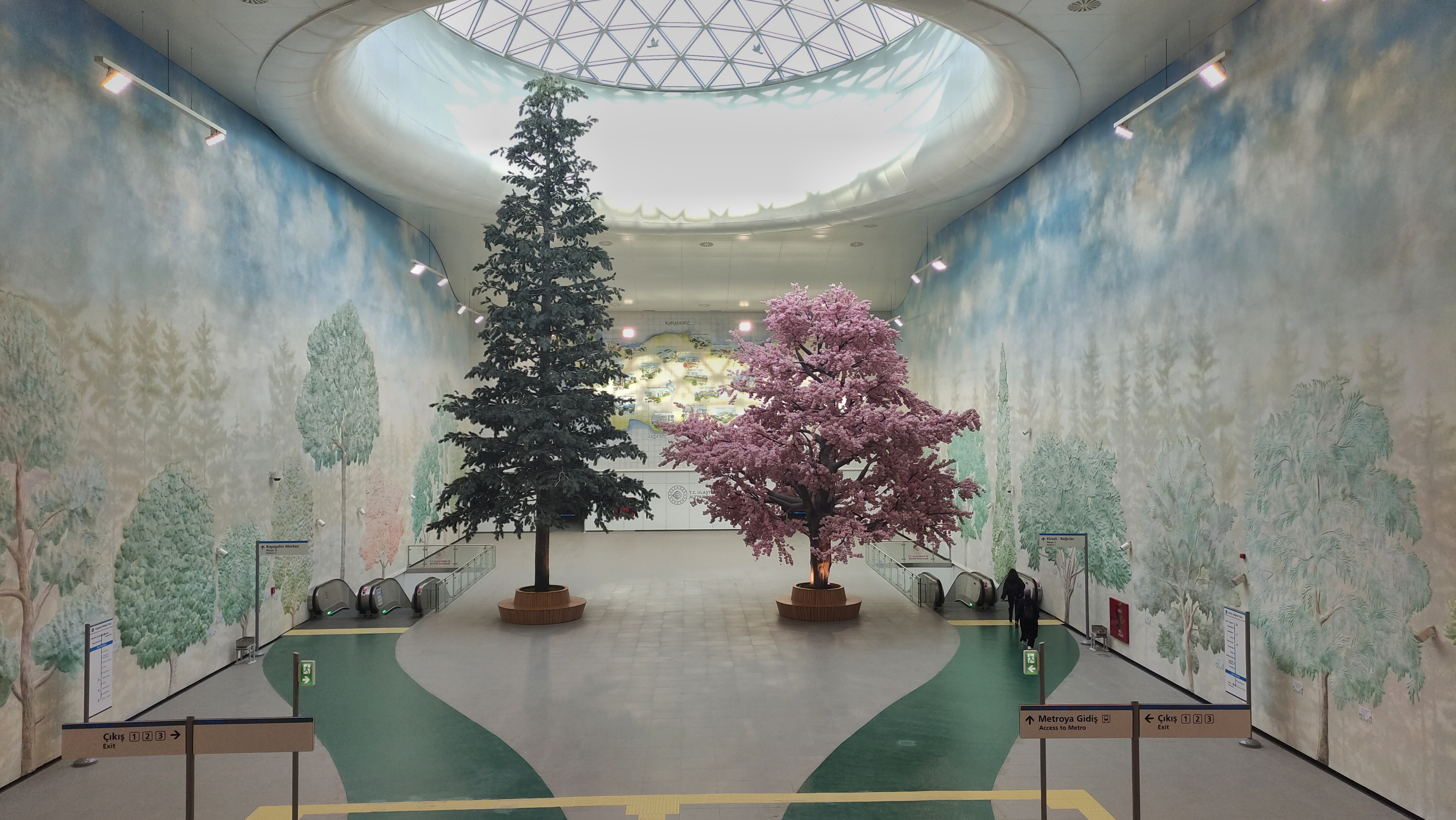
Mezzanine

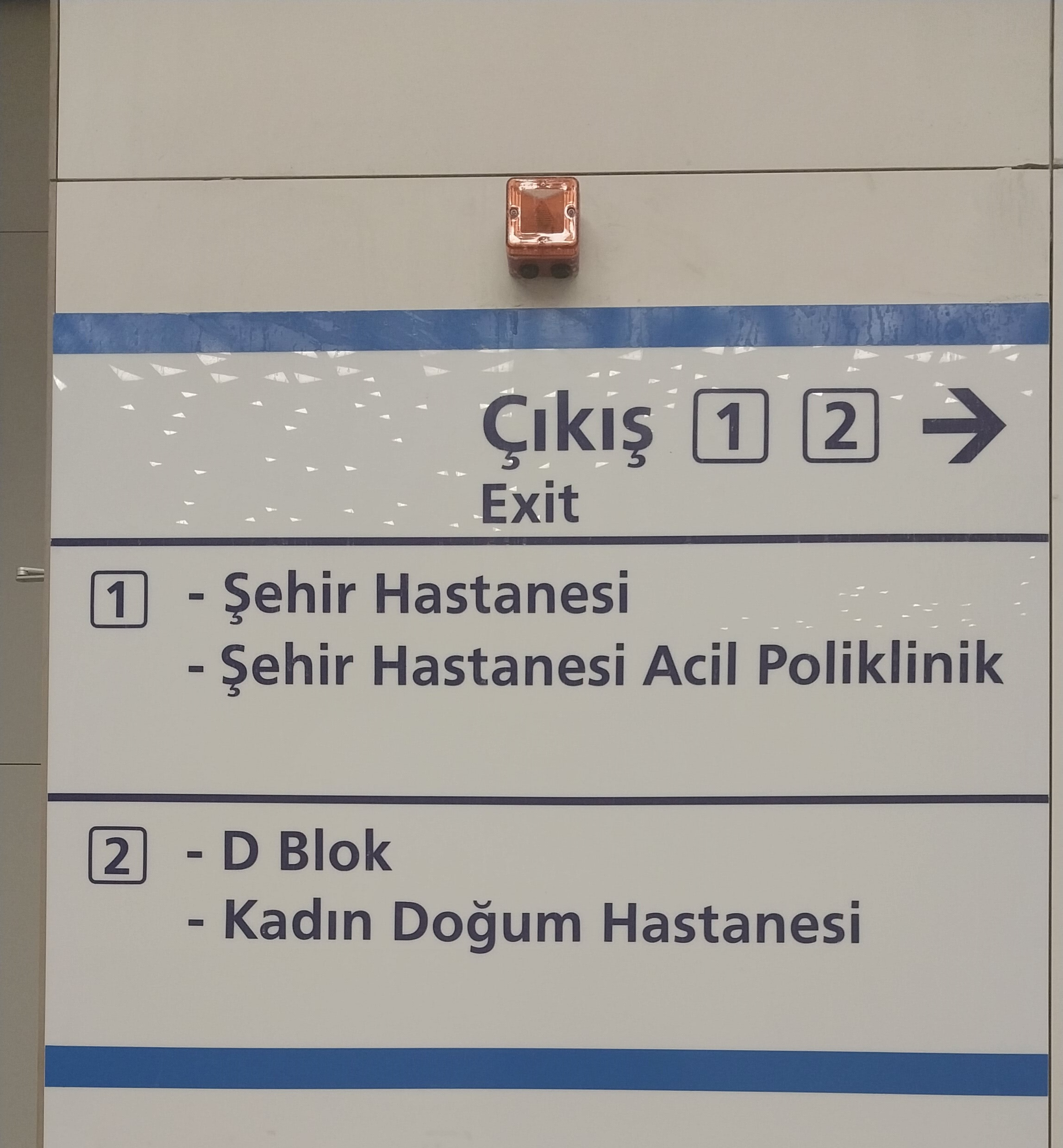
Exit sign

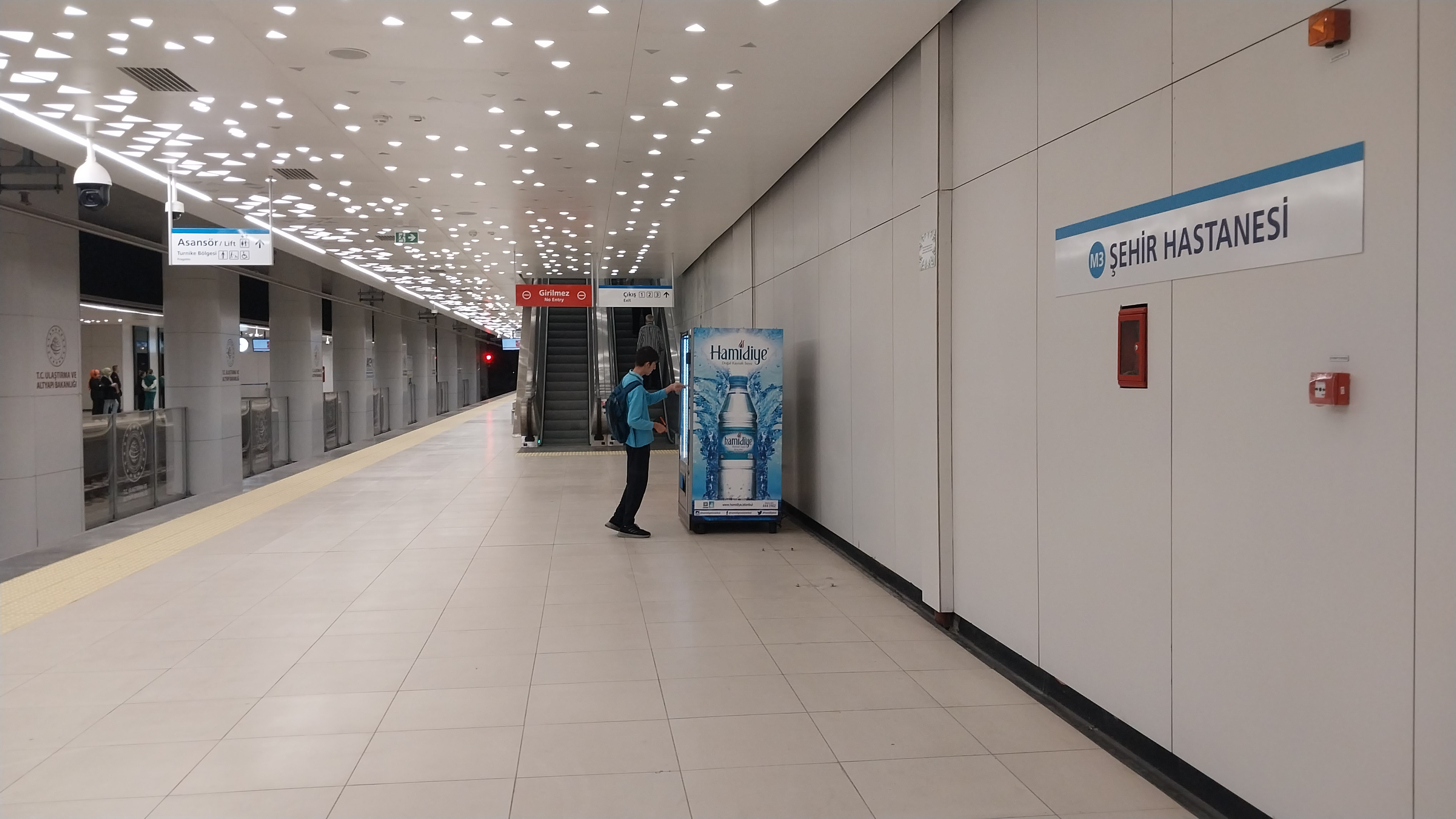
Platform
