= Onurkent station =

Station of the Istanbul Metro

Onurkent
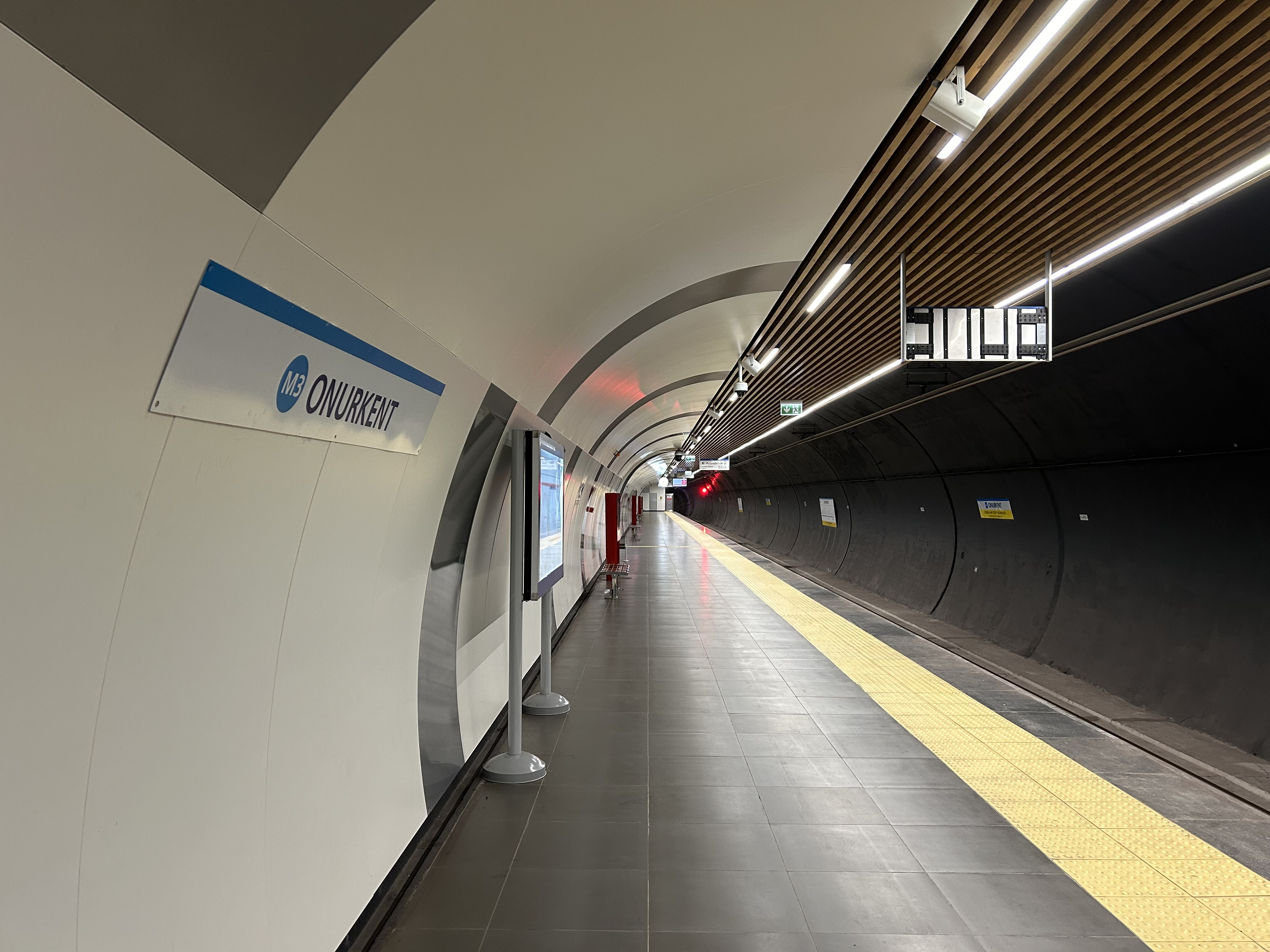

General information
- Location: Başakşehir Neighborhood, Mimar Kemalettin Boulevard, 34480; Başakşehir, Istanbul; Turkey
- Coordinates: 41°6′48″N 28°47′26″E
- System: Istanbul Metro rapid transit station
- Owner: Istanbul Metropolitan Municipality
- Line: M3
- Platforms: 1 Island platform
- Tracks: 2
- Connections: İETT Bus: 78E, 78F, 78ZB, 89C, 98, 146B, 146K; Istanbul Minibus: Küçükçekmece - Kayaşehir, Topkapı - Kayaşehir, Şirinevler - Kayaşehir, Otogar - Kayaşehir, Sefaköy - Kayaşehir, Sefaköy - Onurkent

Construction
- Structure type: Underground
- Parking: No
- Cycle facilities: Yes
- Accessible: Yes

History
- Opened: 8 April 2023 (3 years ago)
- Electrified: 1,500 V DC Overhead line

Services
Preceding station	Istanbul Metro	Following station
Şehir Hastanesi towards Kayaşehir Merkez	M3 Line	Başakşehir-Metrokent towards Bakırköy Sahil
Location

Onurkent is an underground rapid transit station on the M3 line of the Istanbul Metro. It is located on Mimar Kemalettin Boulevard in Başakşehir. It was opened on 8 April 2023 with the Onurkent-Kayaşehir Merkez expansion built by the Ministry of Transport and Infrastructure.

== Layout ==
Northbound	← toward Kayaşehir Merkez (Şehir Hastanesi)
Island platform, doors will open on the left
Southbound	toward Bakırköy Sahil (Başakşehir-Metrokent) →

== Operation information ==
The line operates between 06:00 and 00:00 and train frequency is 7 minutes at peak hours and 10 minutes at all other times. The line has no night service.

== Gallery ==
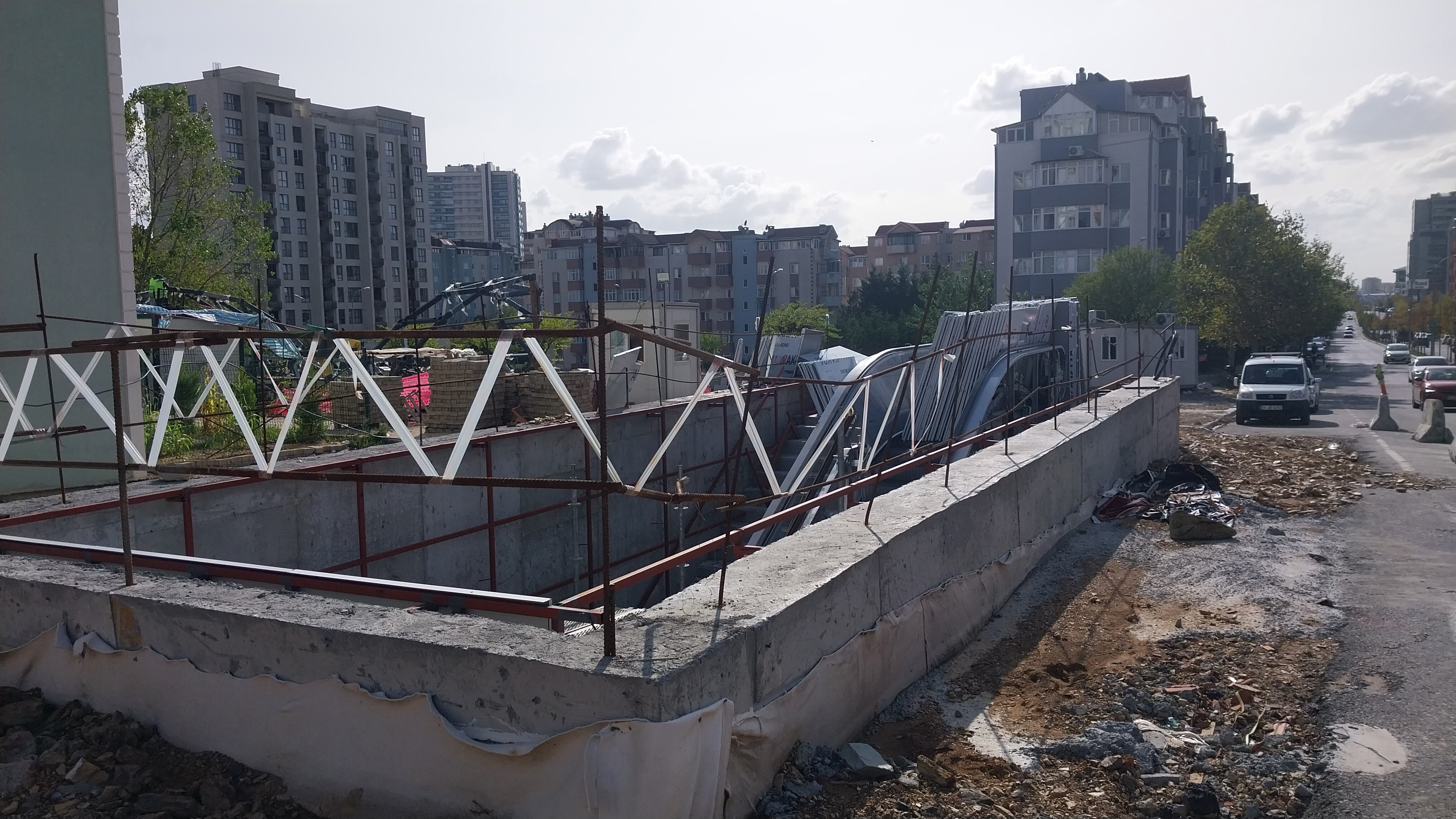
Entrance 1 construction (October 2023)

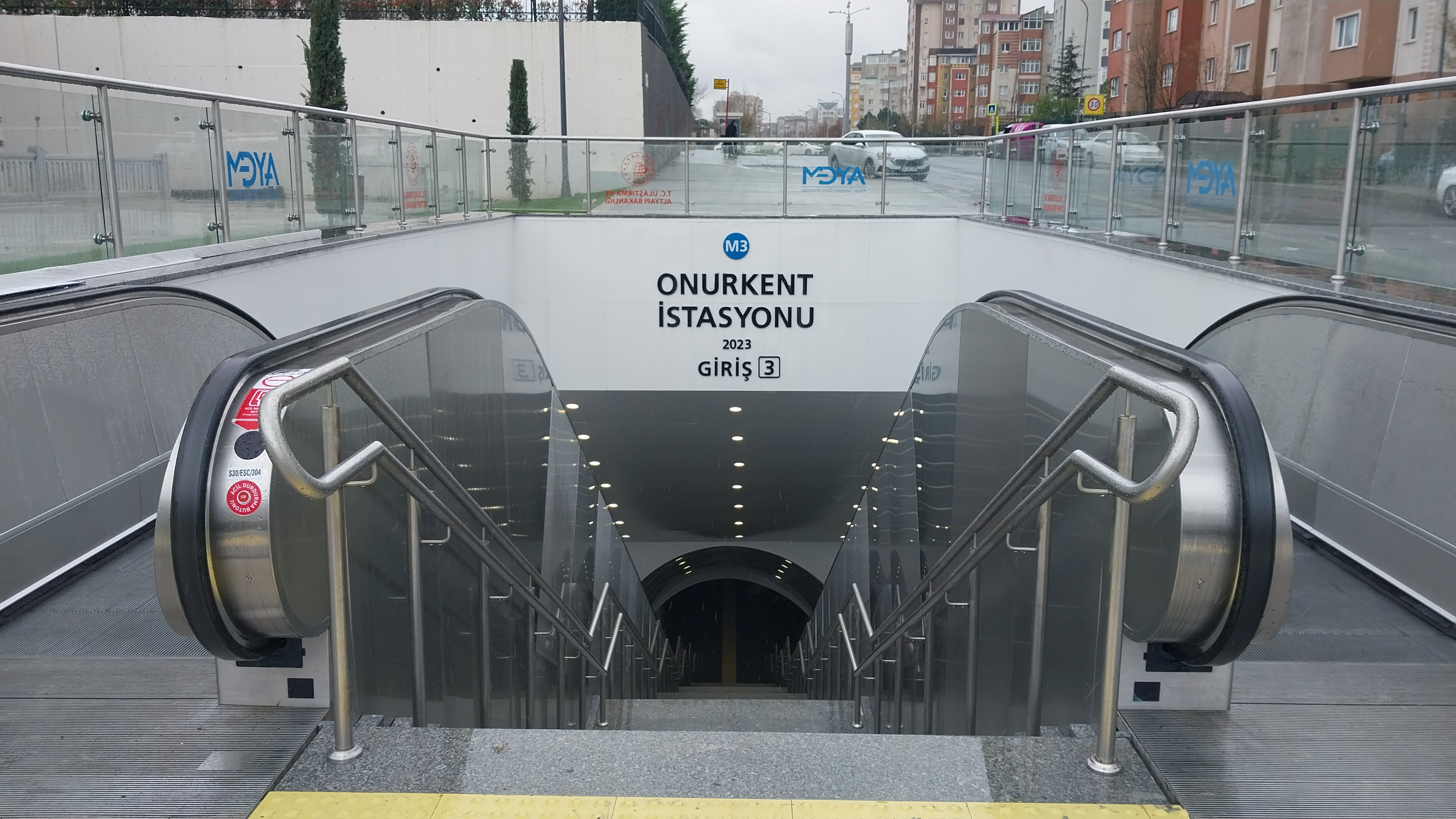
Entrance 2

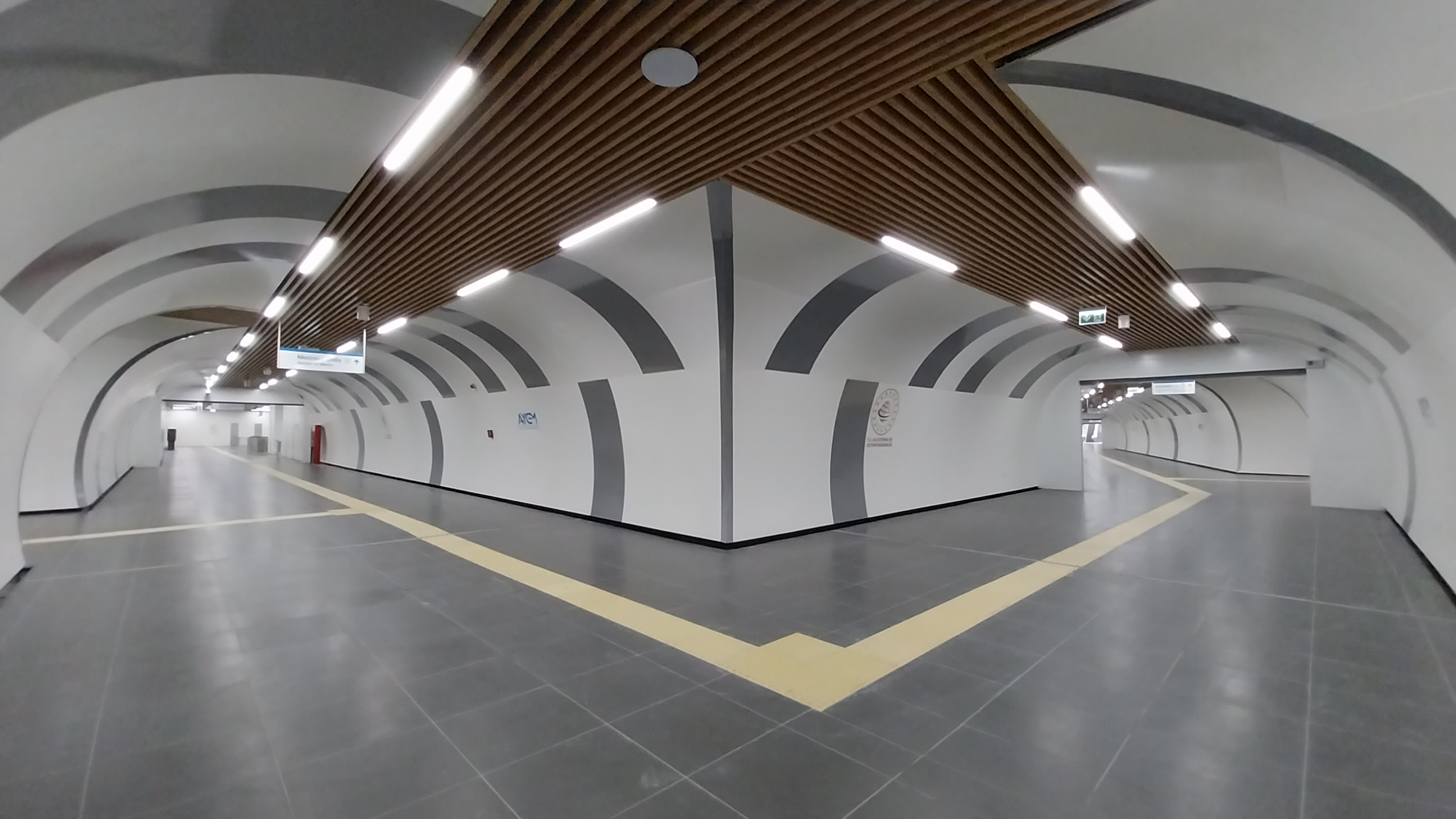
Pedestrian underpass

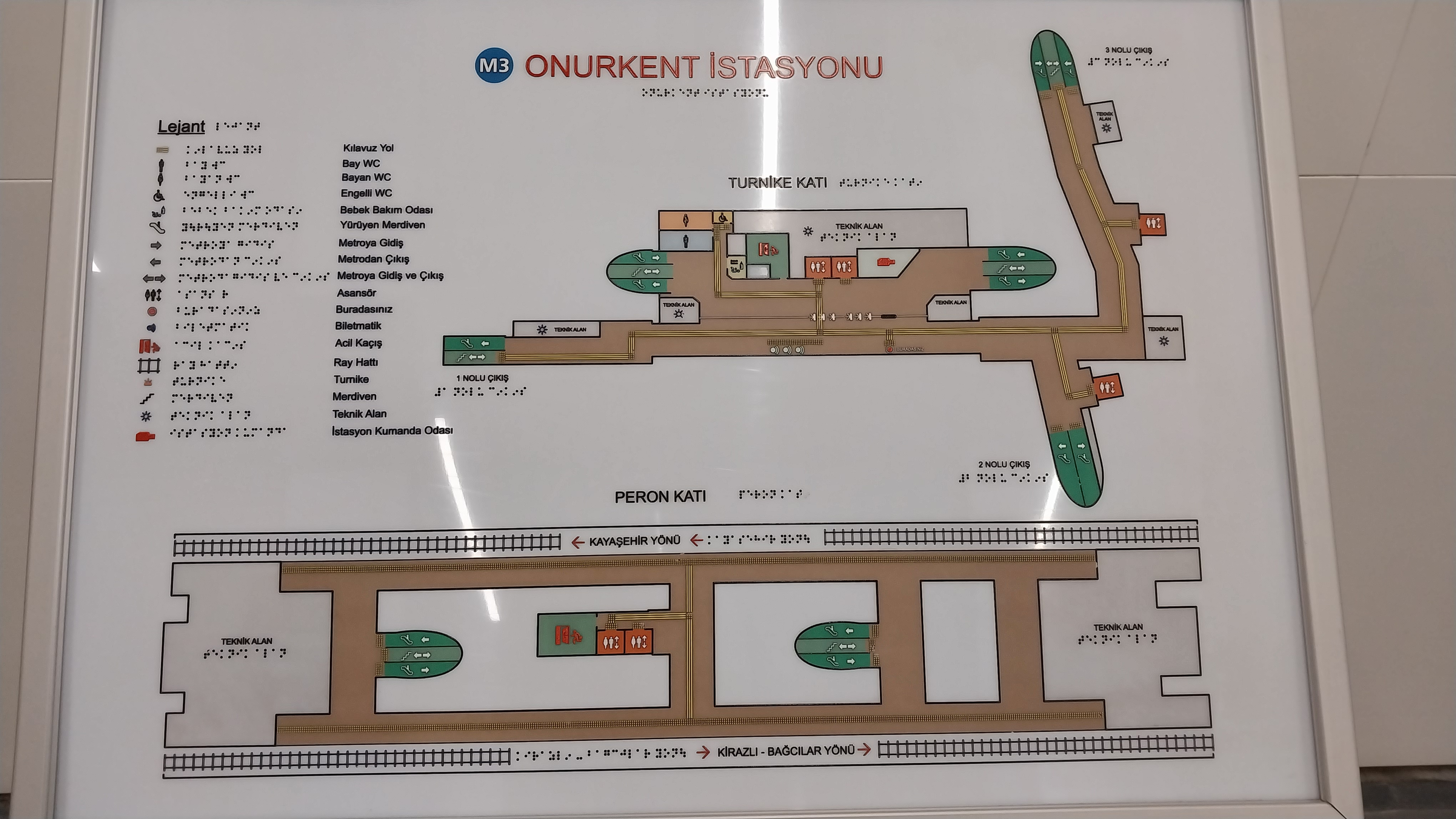
Station diagram

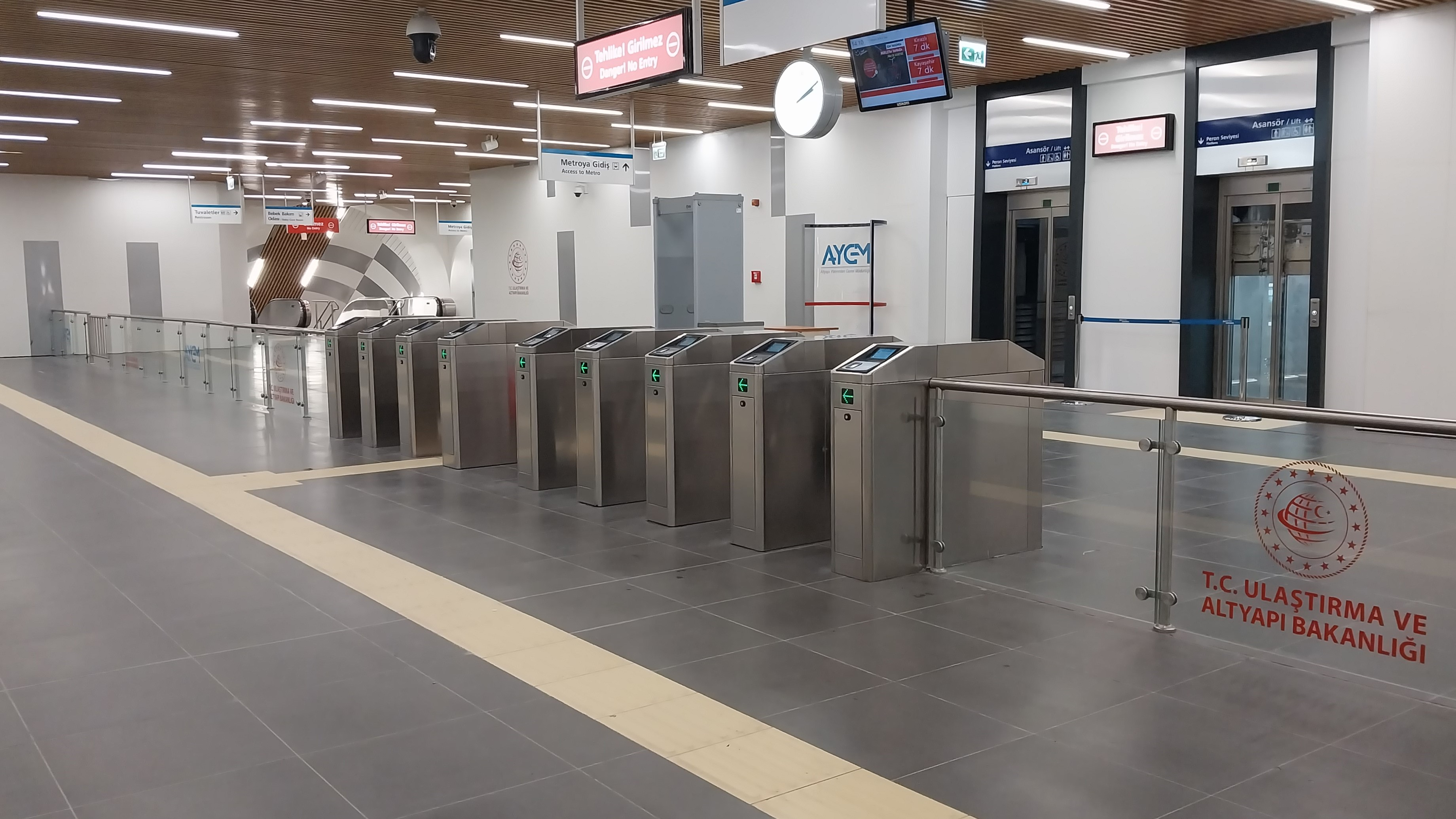
Ticket hall

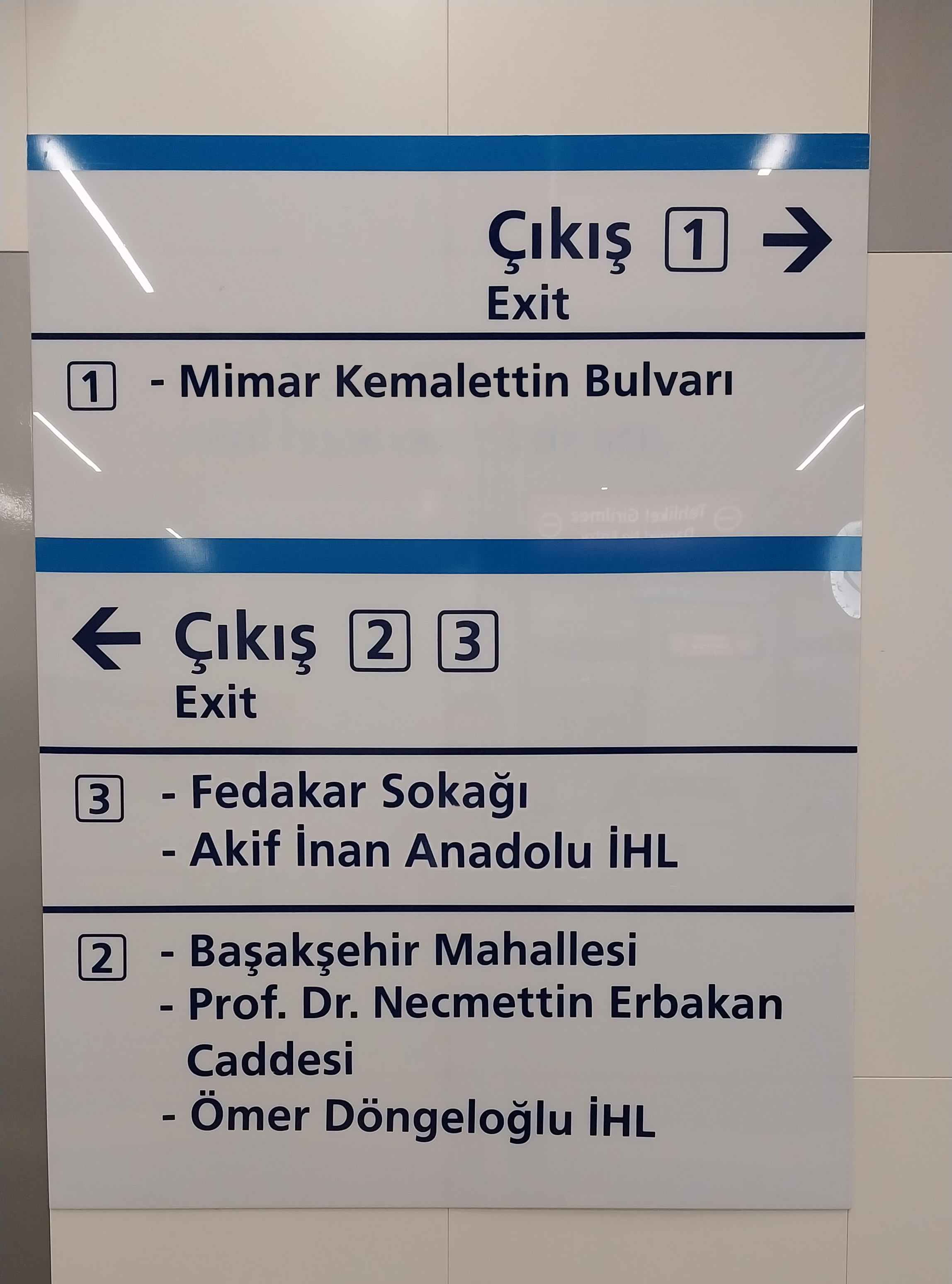
Exit sign (edited)

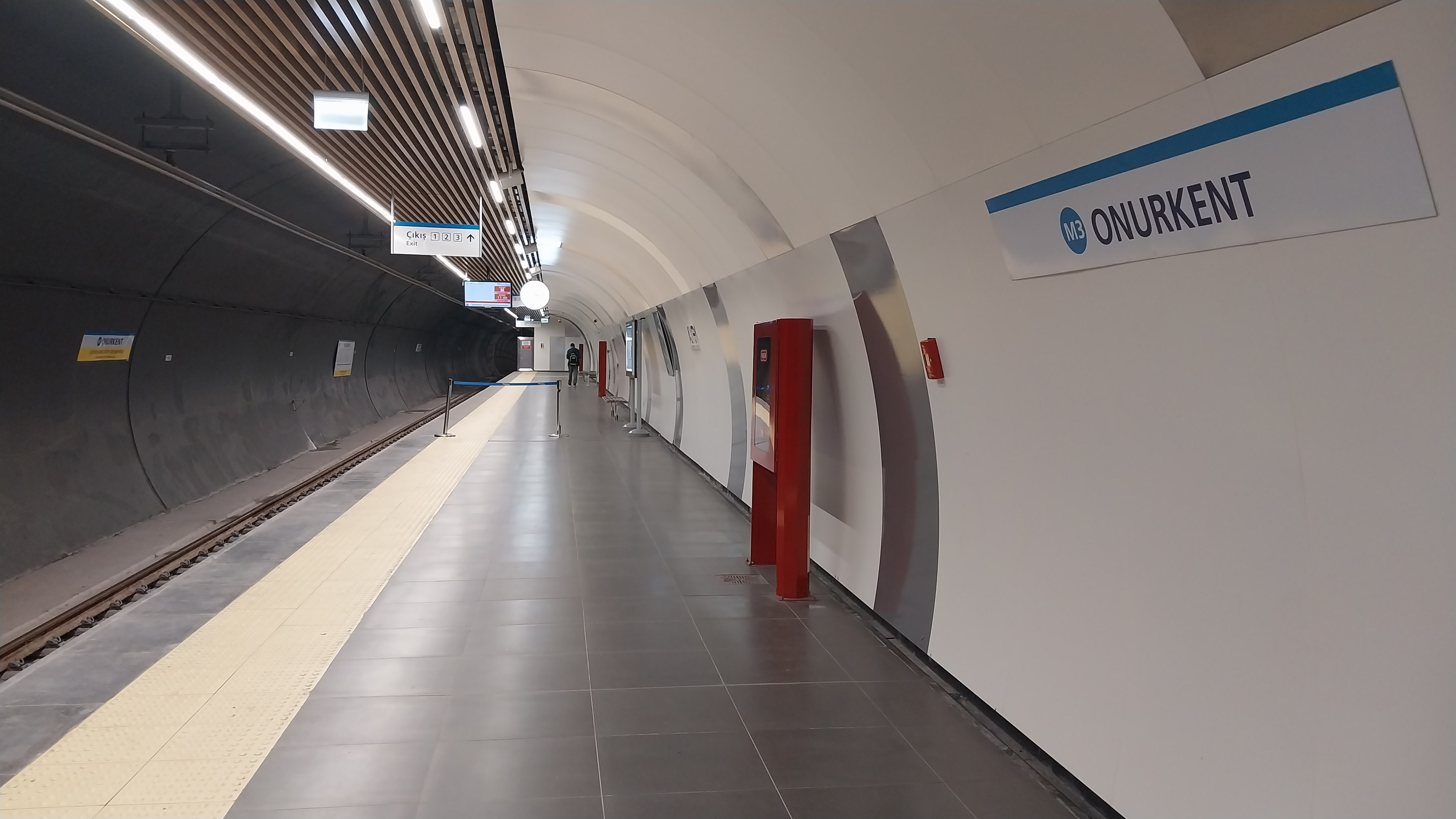
Platform
