= Kayaşehir Merkez station =

Station of the Istanbul Metro

Kayaşehir Merkez
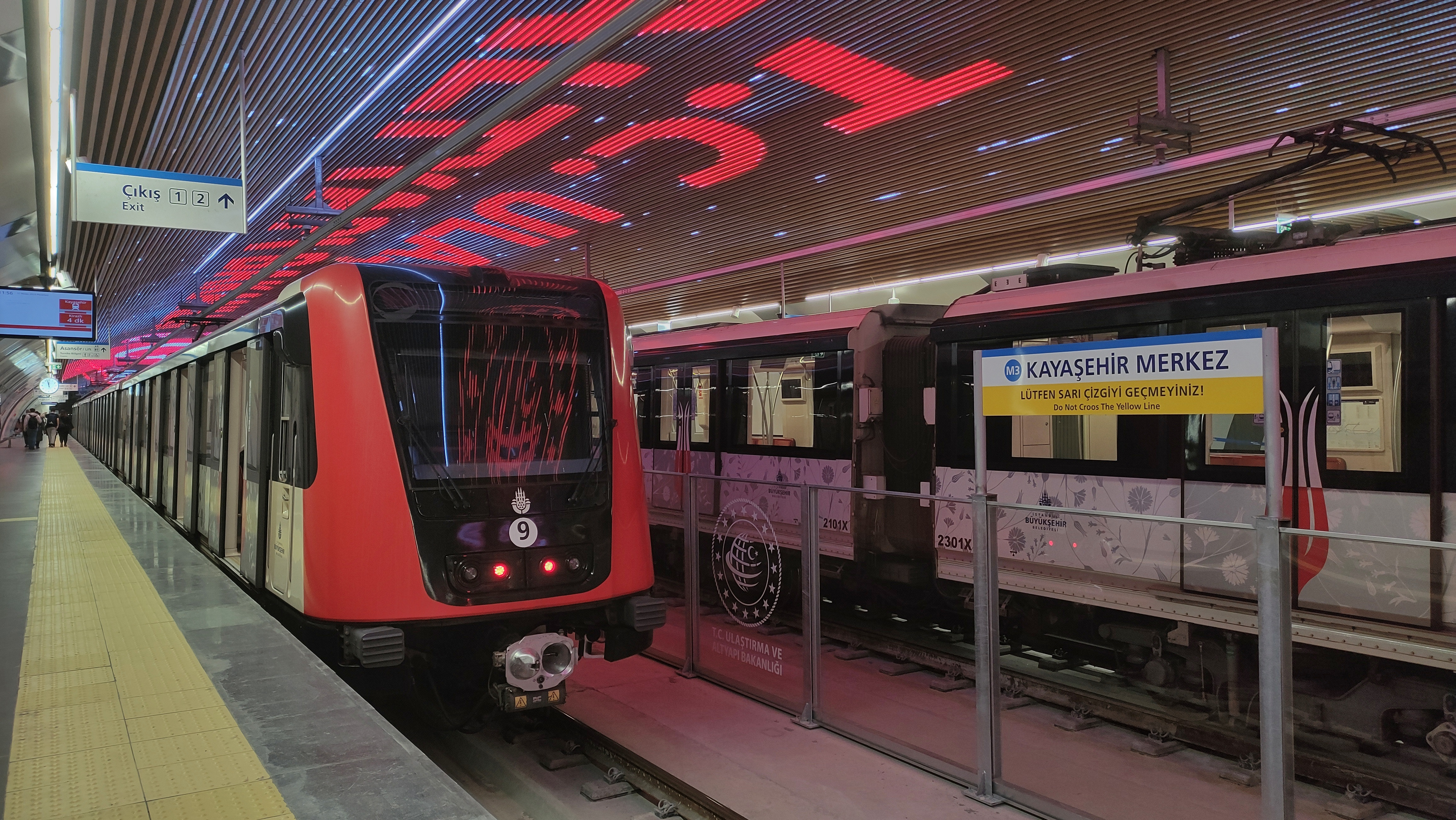
- Platform

General information
- Location: Kayabaşı Neighborhood, Kayaşehir Boulevard, 34494; Başakşehir, Istanbul; Turkey
- Coordinates: 41°7′6″N 28°45′59″E
- System: Istanbul Metro rapid transit station
- Owner: Istanbul Metropolitan Municipality
- Line: M3
- Platforms: 2 side platforms
- Tracks: 2
- Connections: M11 (Kayaşehir); İETT Bus: Celalettin Ökten Kız Anadolu İmam Hatip Lisesi: 36F, 78F, 79F, 79FY, 79GE, 79KM, 79KT, MK22; Istanbul Minibus: Forum İstanbul - Kayaşehir (A15)

Construction
- Structure type: Underground
- Parking: No
- Cycle facilities: Yes
- Accessible: Yes

History
- Opened: 8 April 2023 (3 years ago)
- Electrified: 1,500 V DC Overhead line

Services
Preceding station	Istanbul Metro	Following station
Terminus	M3 Line	Toplu Konutlar towards Bakırköy Sahil
Transfer at Kayaşehir
Olimpiyatköy towards Halkalı	M11 Line	İbn Haldun Üniversitesi towards Gayrettepe
Location

Kayaşehir Merkez is an underground rapid transit station on the M3 line of the Istanbul Metro and its northern terminus. It is located on Kayaşehir Boulevard in the Kayabaşı neighborhood of Başakşehir. The station was opened on 8 April 2023 with the Onurkent-Kayaşehir Merkez expansion built by the Ministry of Transport and Infrastructure. The station is an interchange station with the M11 line at Kayaşehir, which uses a different station name but provides an out-of-station transfer with the M3 line.

== Layout ==
Side platform, currently unused
	No passenger service
Southbound	toward Bakırköy Sahil (Toplu Konutlar) →
Side platform, doors will open on the left

== Operation information ==
The M3 line operates between 06:00 and 00:00 and train frequency is 7 minutes at peak hours and 10 minutes at all other times. The line has no night service.

== Gallery ==
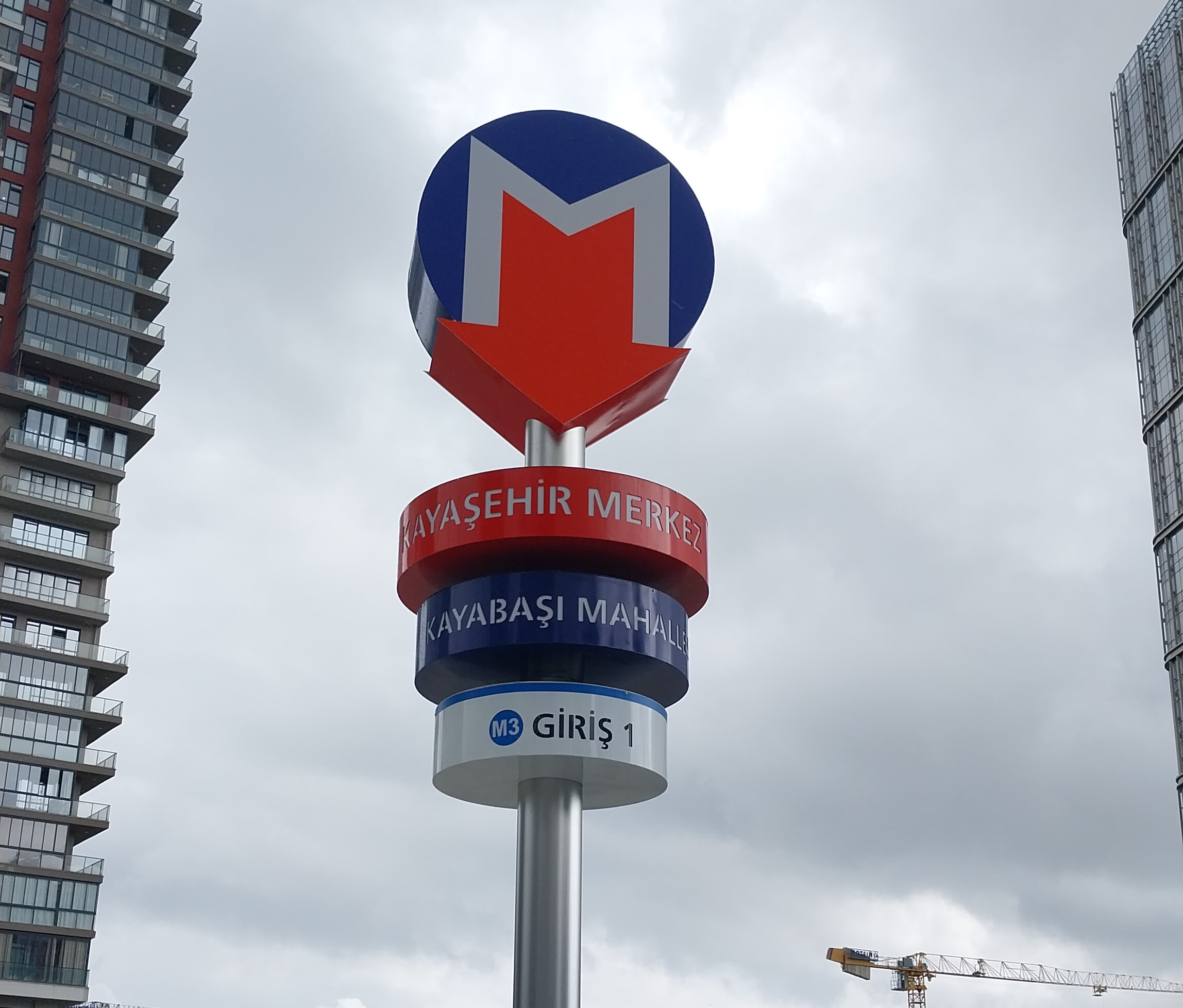
Totem

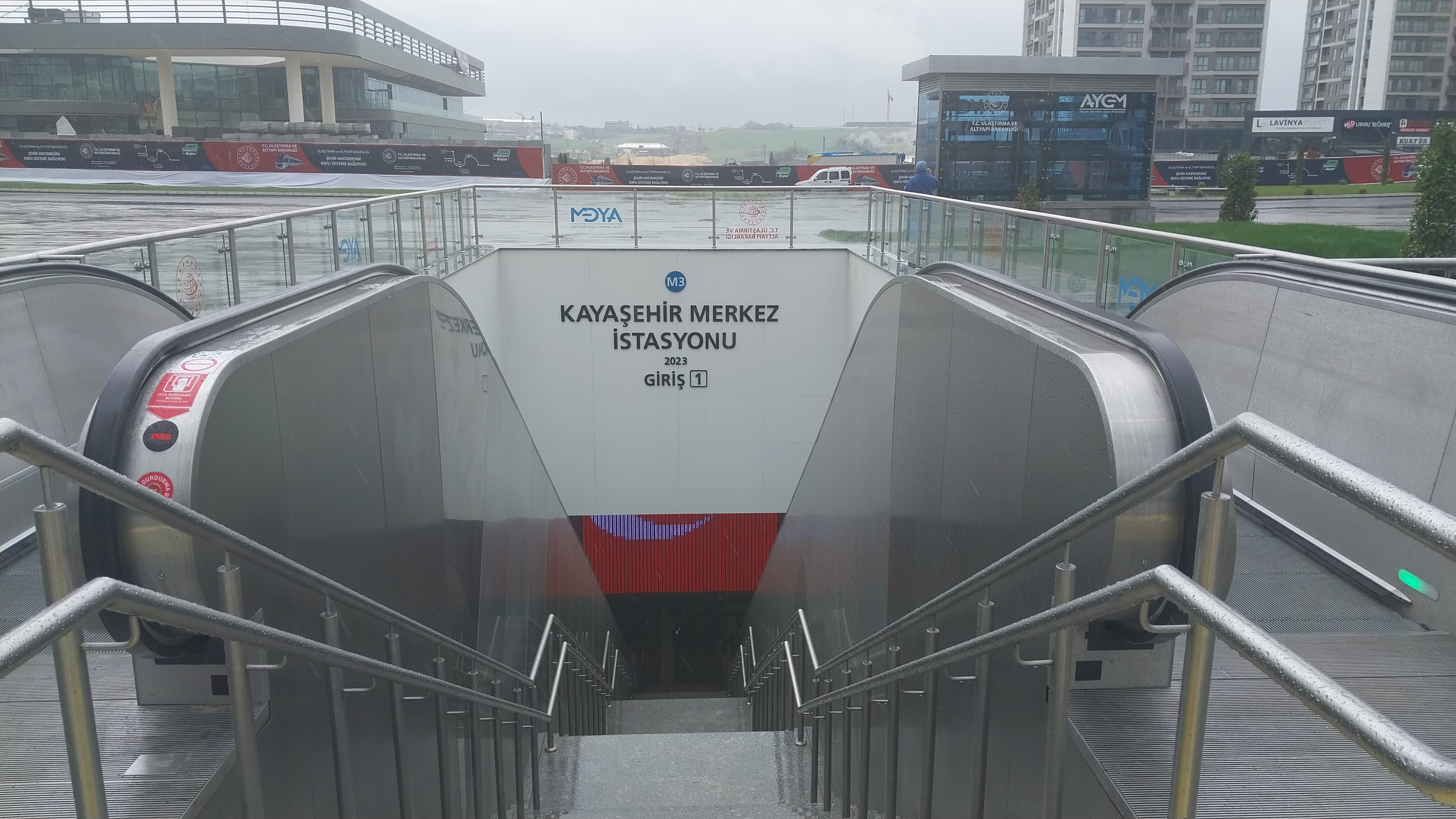
Entrance 1

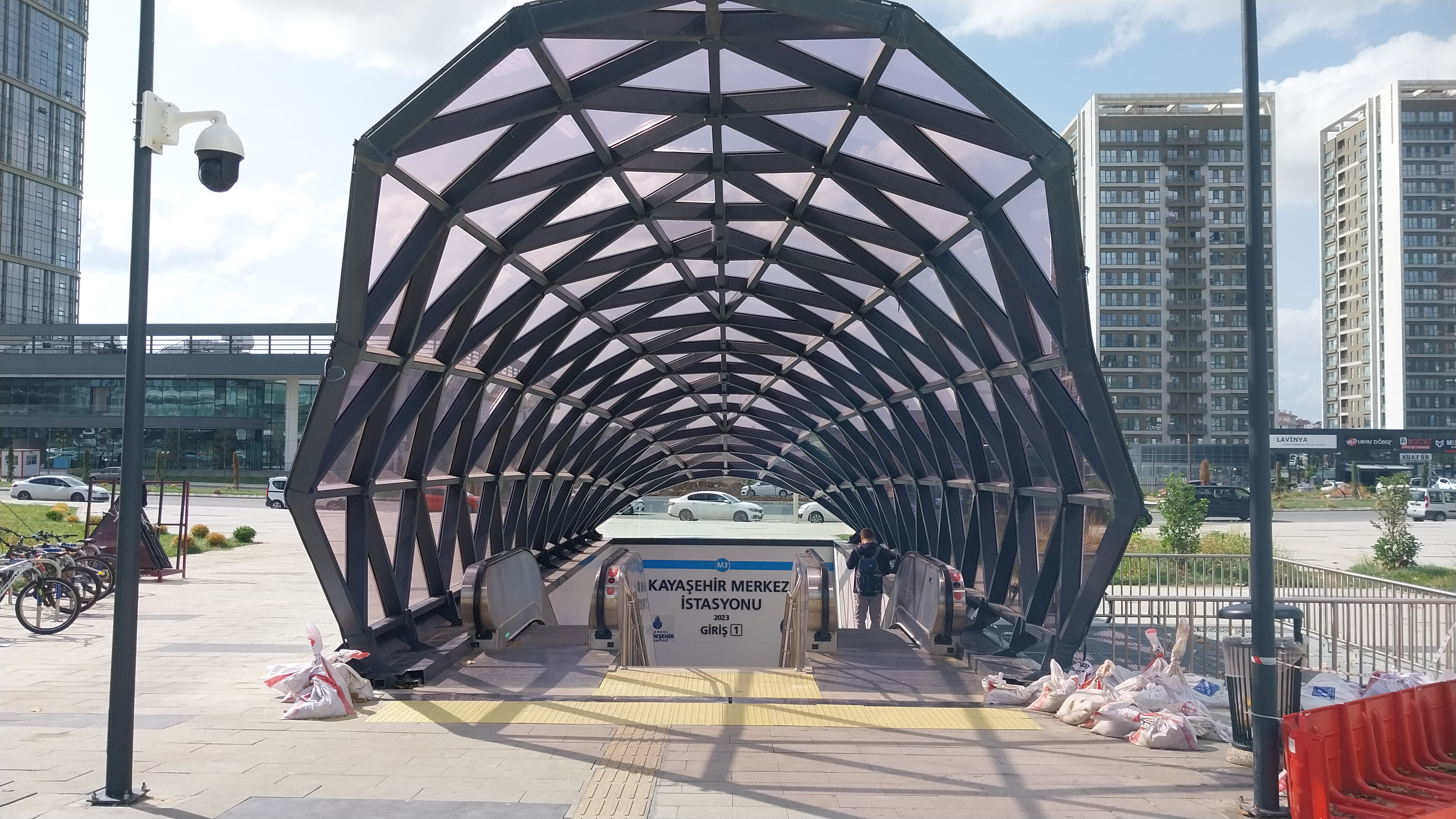
Entrance roof

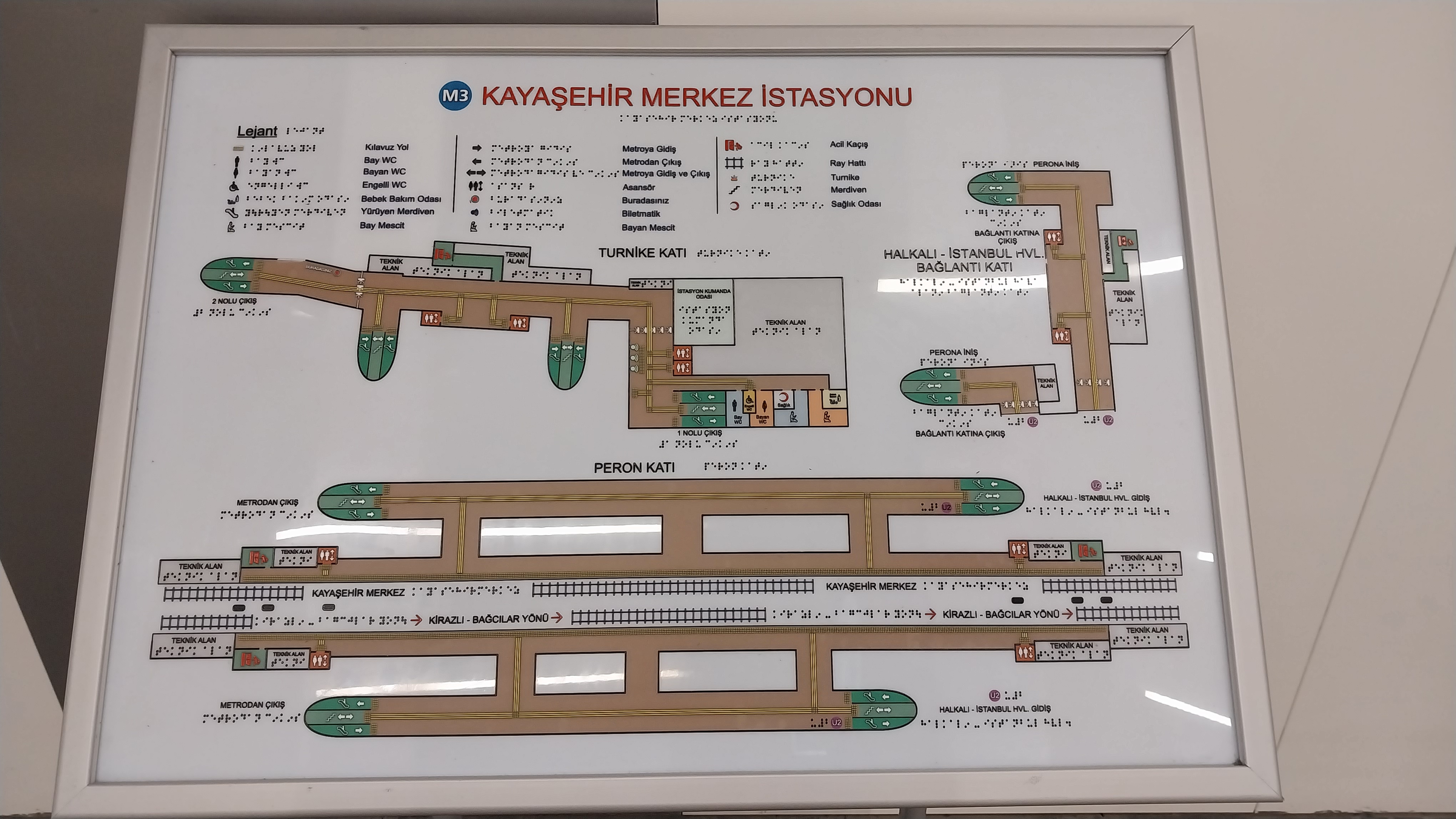
Station diagram

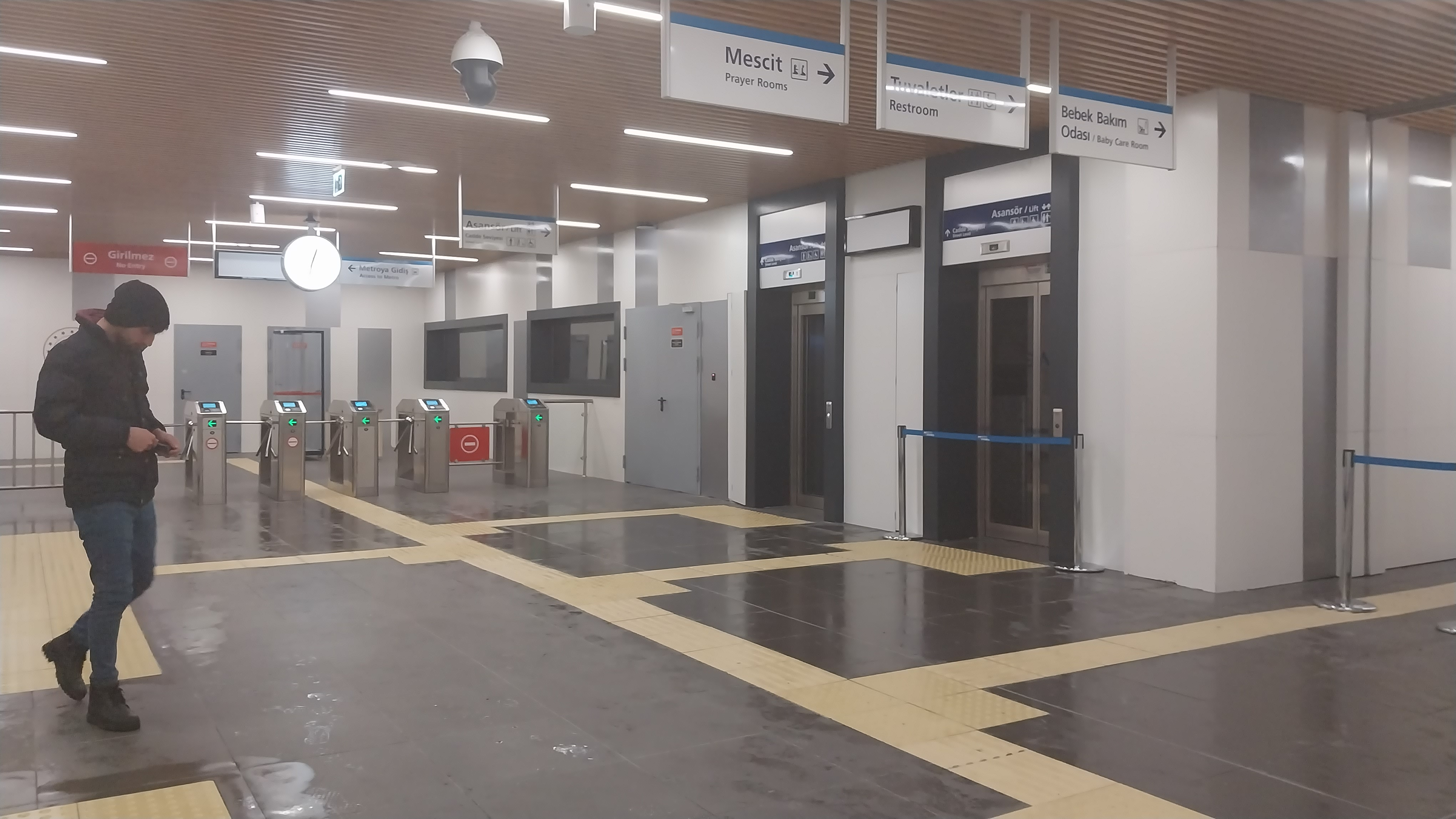
Ticket hall

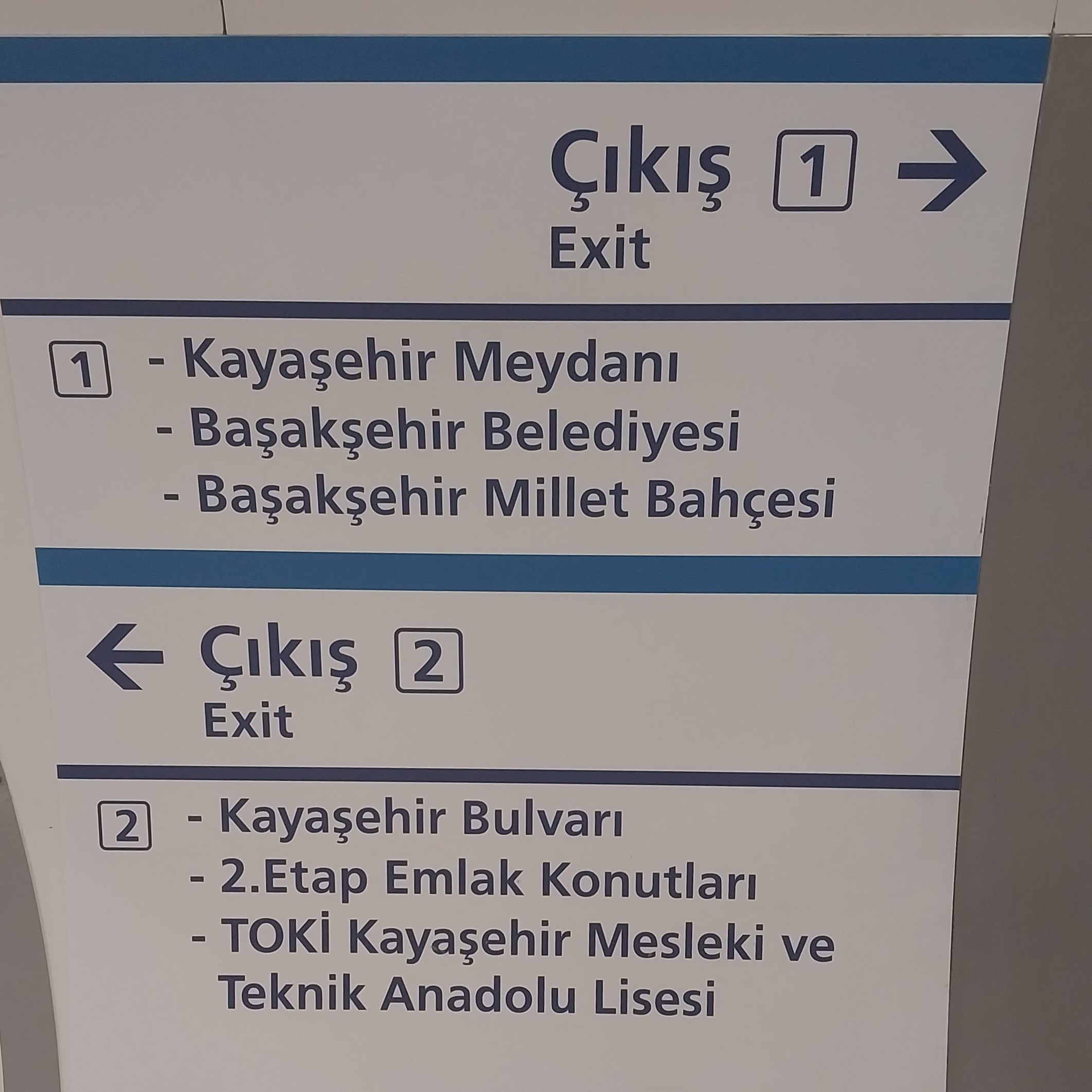
Exit sign

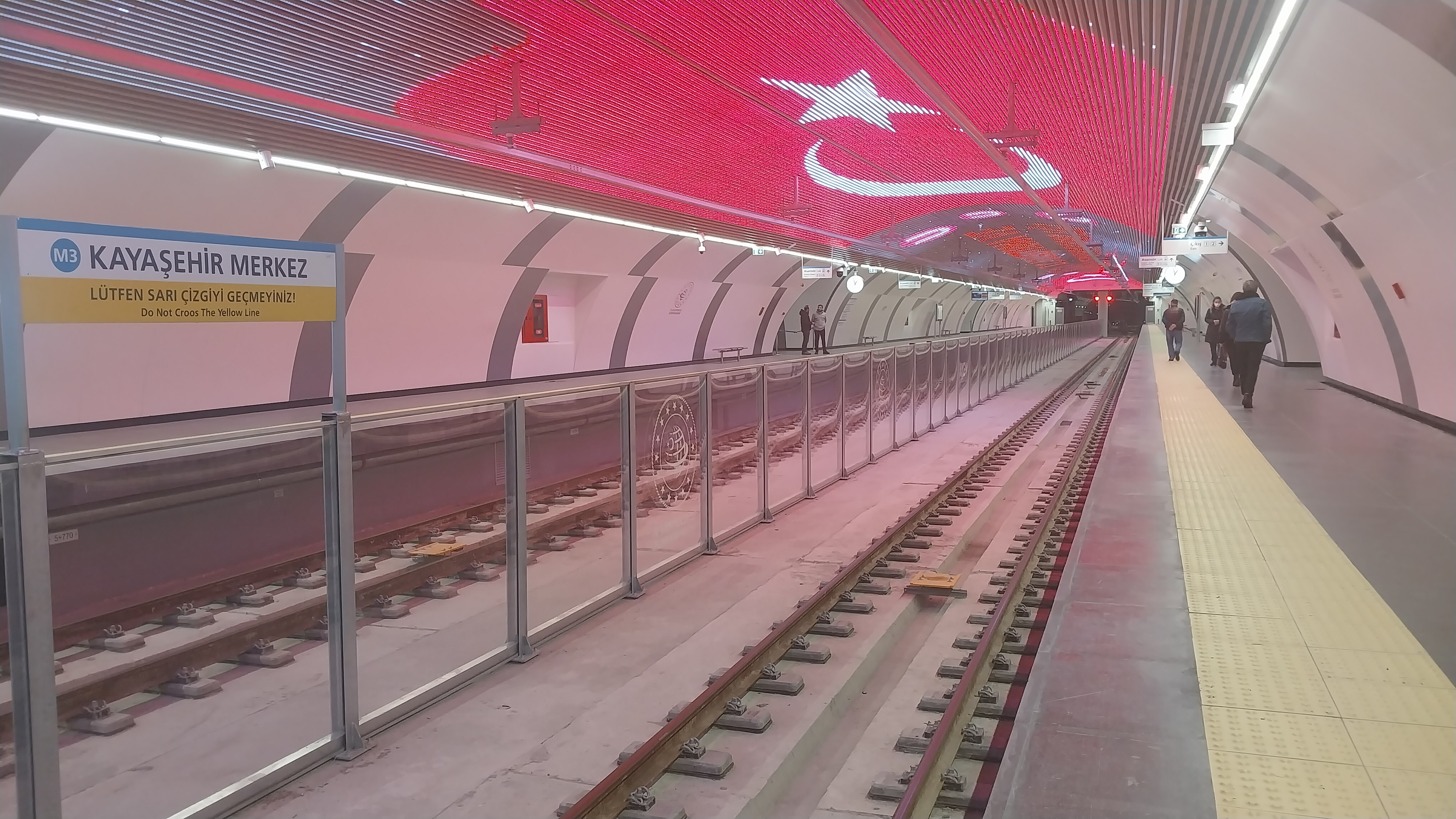
Platform
