= İhsaniye station =

Station of the Istanbul Metro

İhsaniye
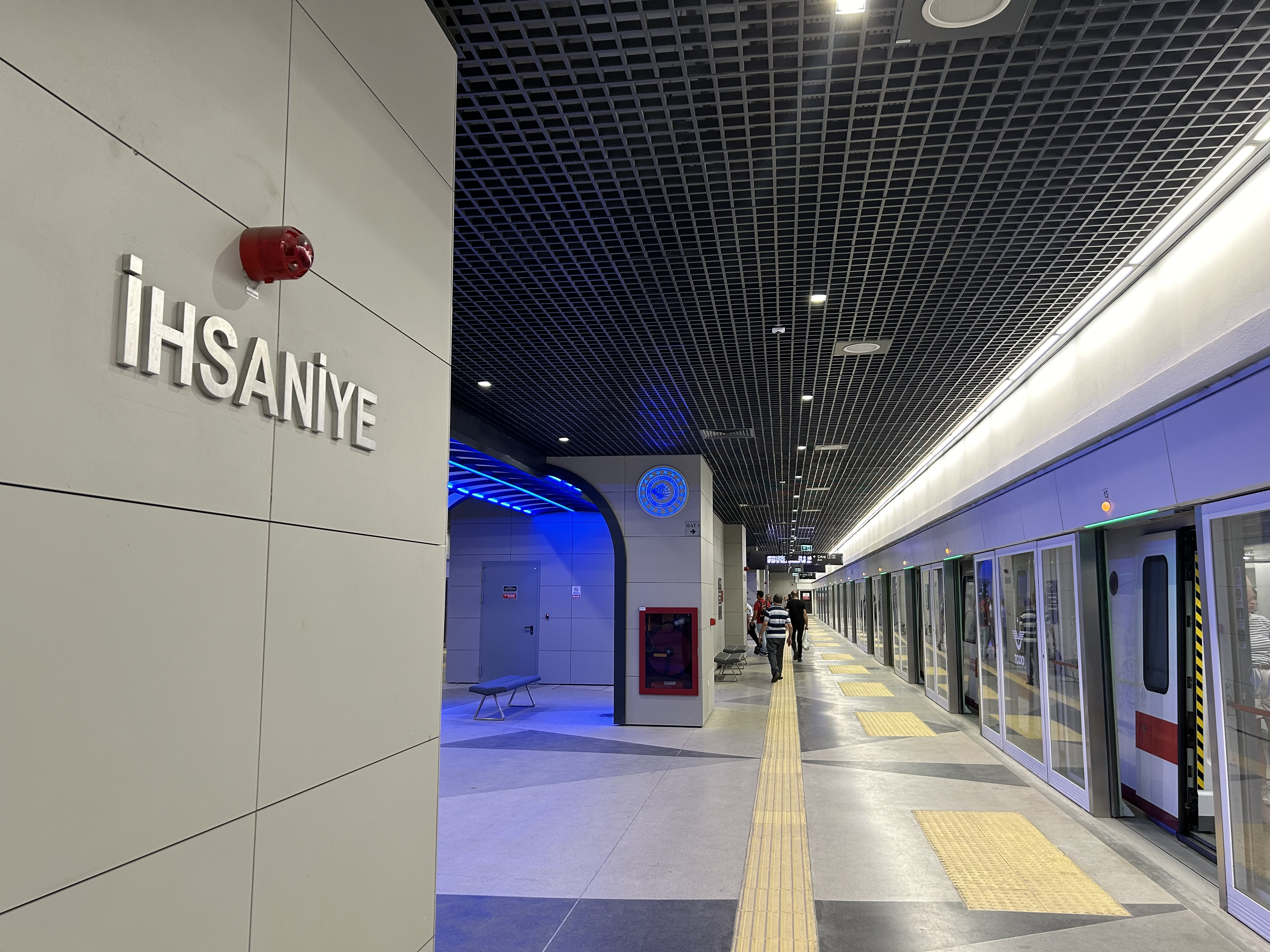

General information
- Location: İhsaniye Neighborhood, D.020, 34076; Eyüp, Istanbul; Turkey
- Coordinates: 41°14′34″N 28°48′32″E
- System: Istanbul Metro rapid transit station
- Owner: Ministry of Transport and Infrastructure
- Operator: TCDD Transport
- Line: M11
- Platforms: 1 Island platform
- Tracks: 2
- Connections: İETT Bus: İhsaniye Kavşağı: 48F, 48KA, 48M, 48P

Construction
- Structure type: Underground
- Depth: 23 metres (75 ft)
- Parking: Yes
- Cycle facilities: Yes
- Accessible: Yes

History
- Opened: 22 January 2023 (3 years ago)
- Electrified: 1,500 V DC Overhead line

Services
Preceding station	Istanbul Metro	Following station
Istanbul Airport towards Halkalı	M11 Line	Göktürk towards Gayrettepe
Location

İhsaniye is an underground rapid transit station on the M11 line of the Istanbul Metro. It is located on the D.020 highway in the İhsaniye neighborhood of Eyüp district, north of the town of İhsaniye. The station is among the first five metro stations to be located outside of the city (urban area) of Istanbul. It was opened on 22 January 2023.

== History ==
Construction of the station began in 2016, along with the entire route from Gayrettepe to the Istanbul Airport.

== Layout ==
Northbound	← toward Halkalı - Istanbul Airport (Istanbul Airport)
Island platform, doors will open on the left
Southbound	toward Gayrettepe (Göktürk) →

== Operation information ==
The line operates between 06:00 and 00:40 and train frequency is 20 minutes. The line has no night service.

== Gallery ==
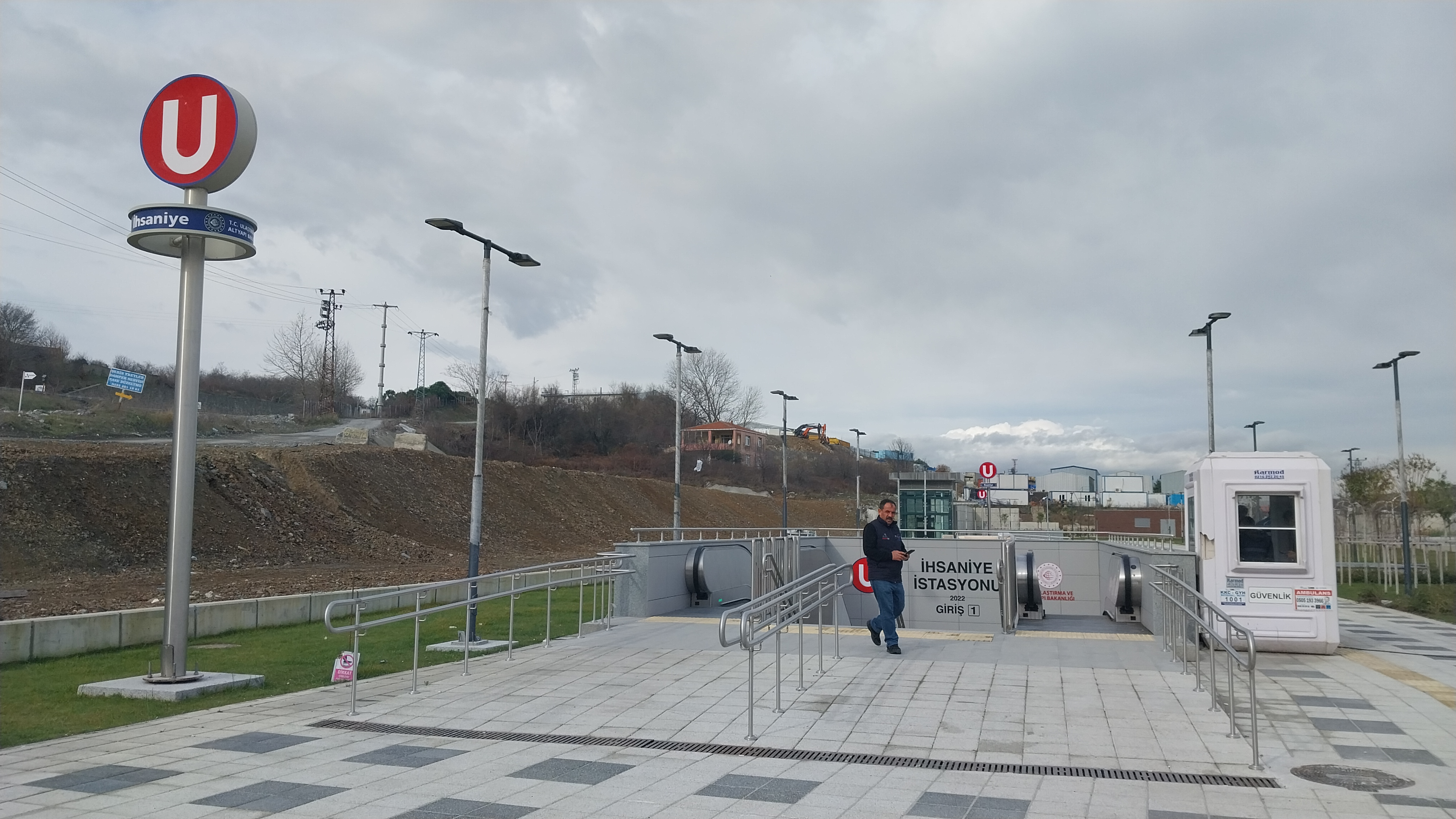
Entrance 1

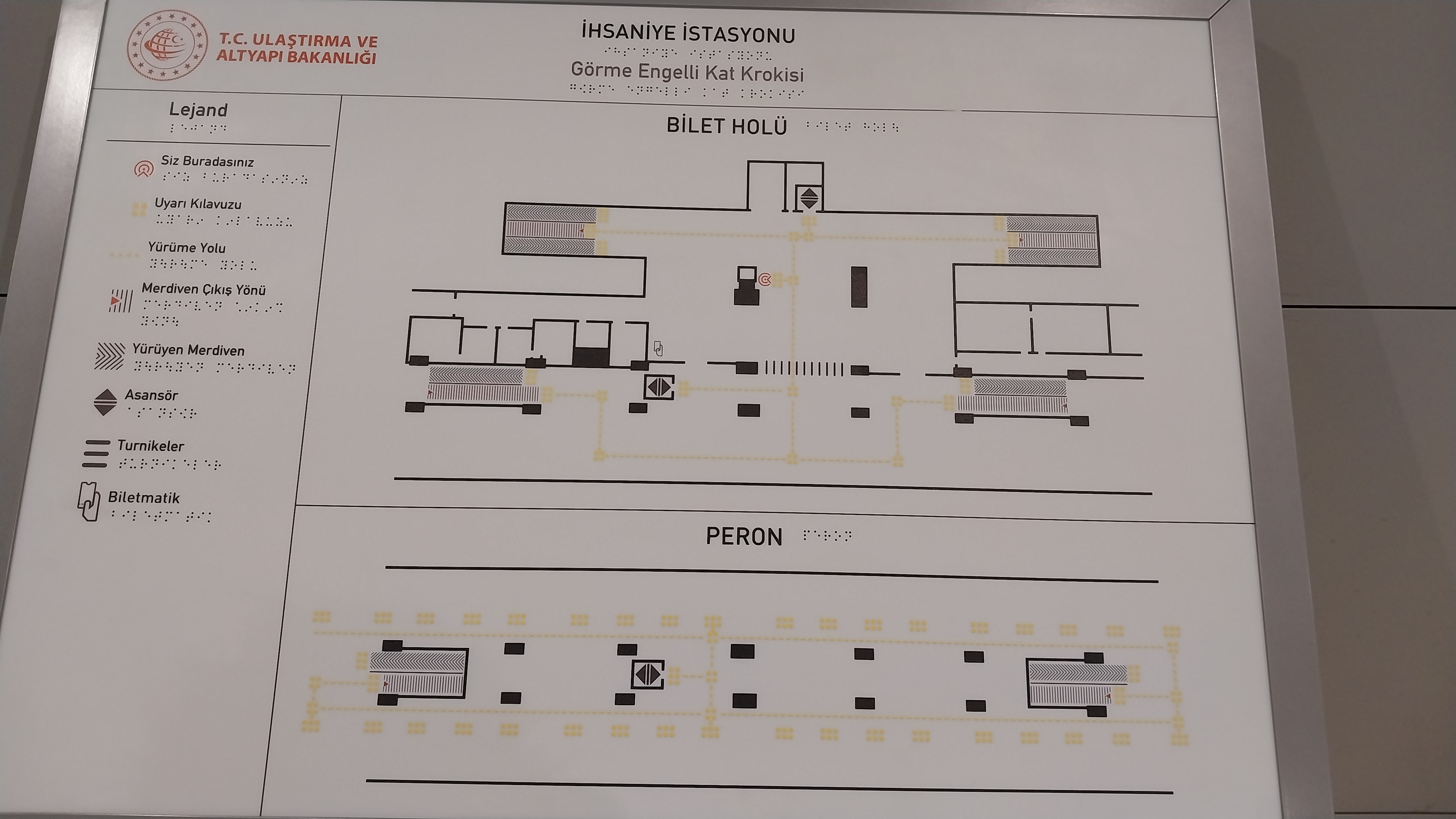
Station diagram

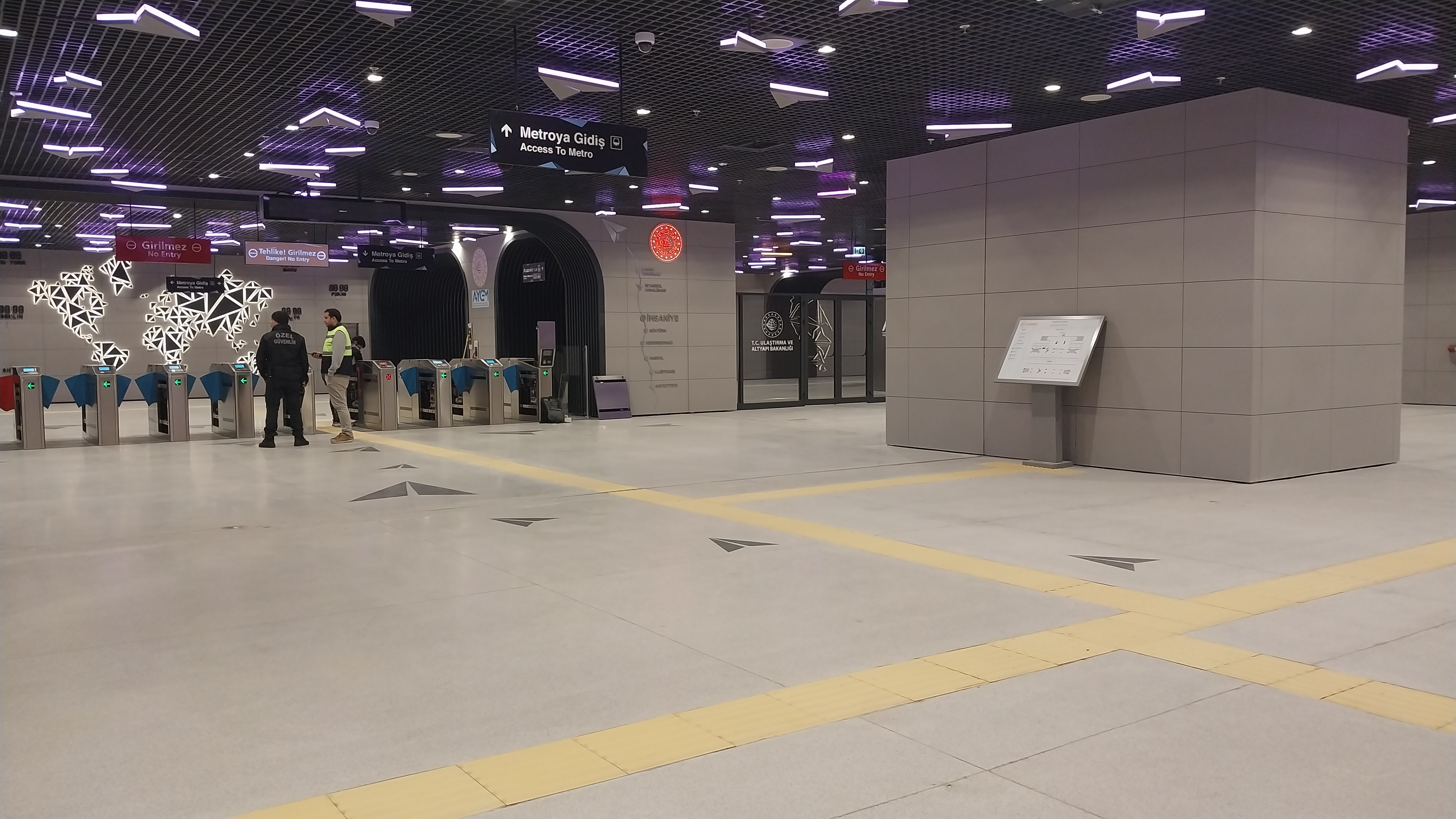
Ticket hall

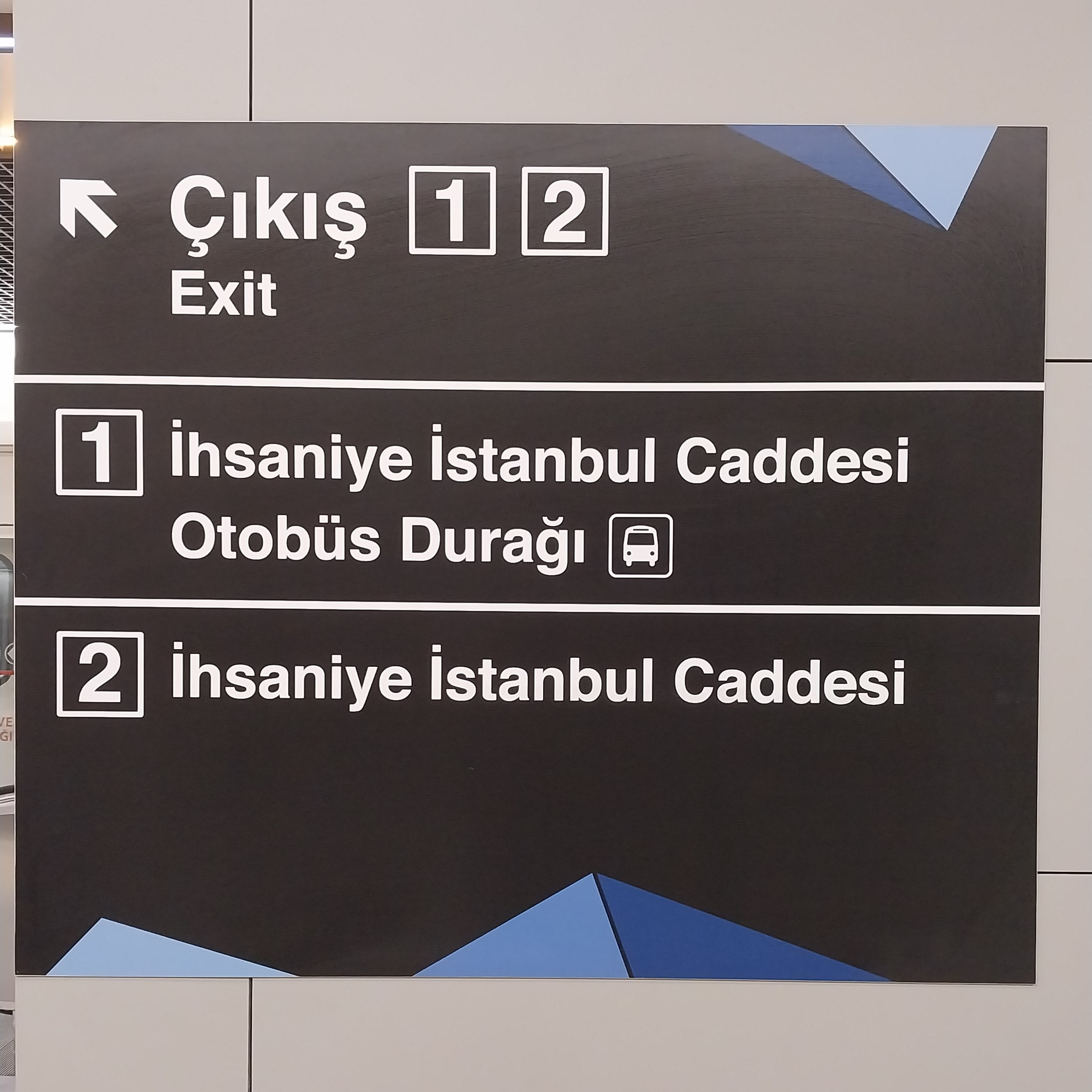
Exit sign

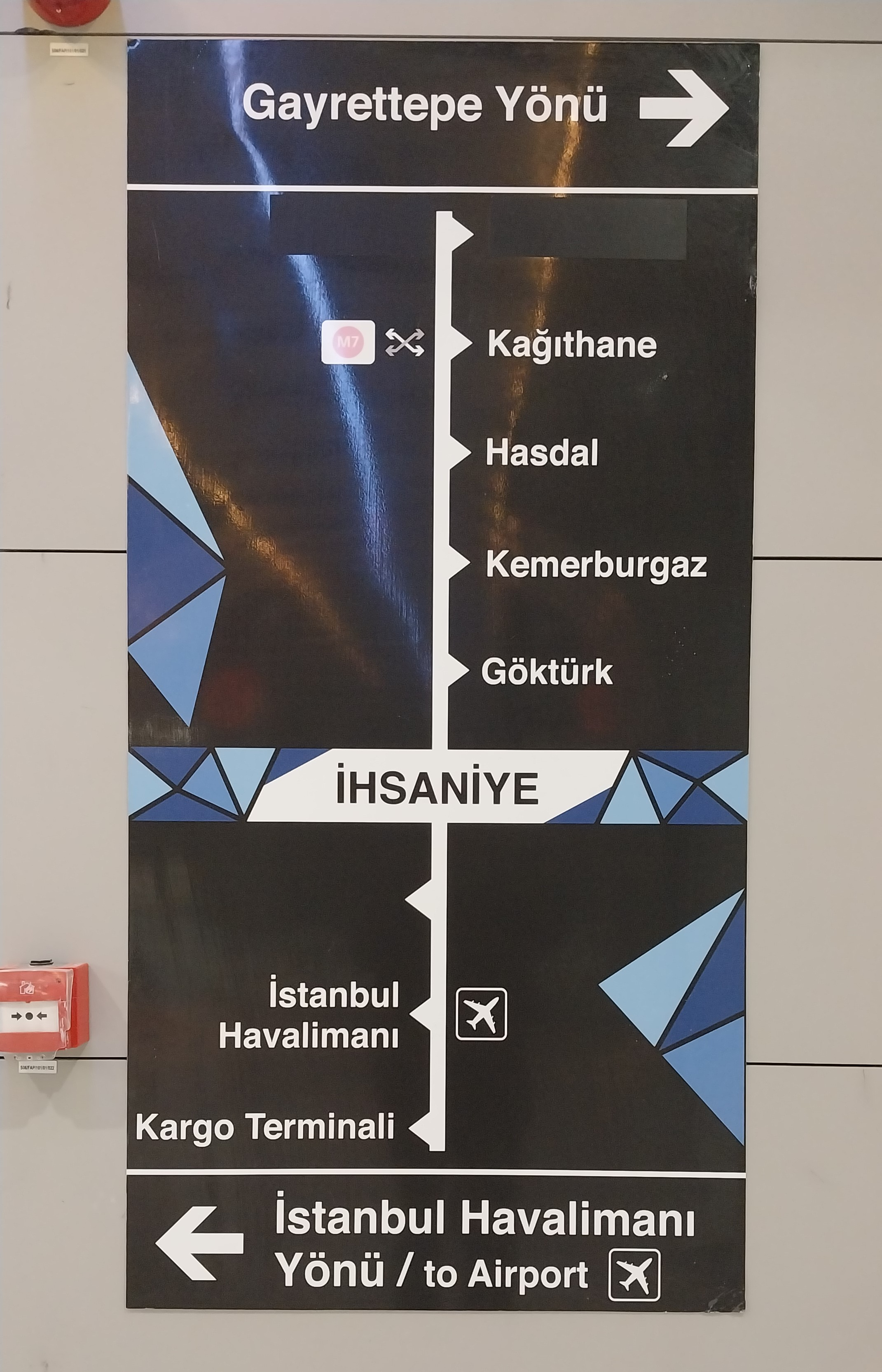
Route map

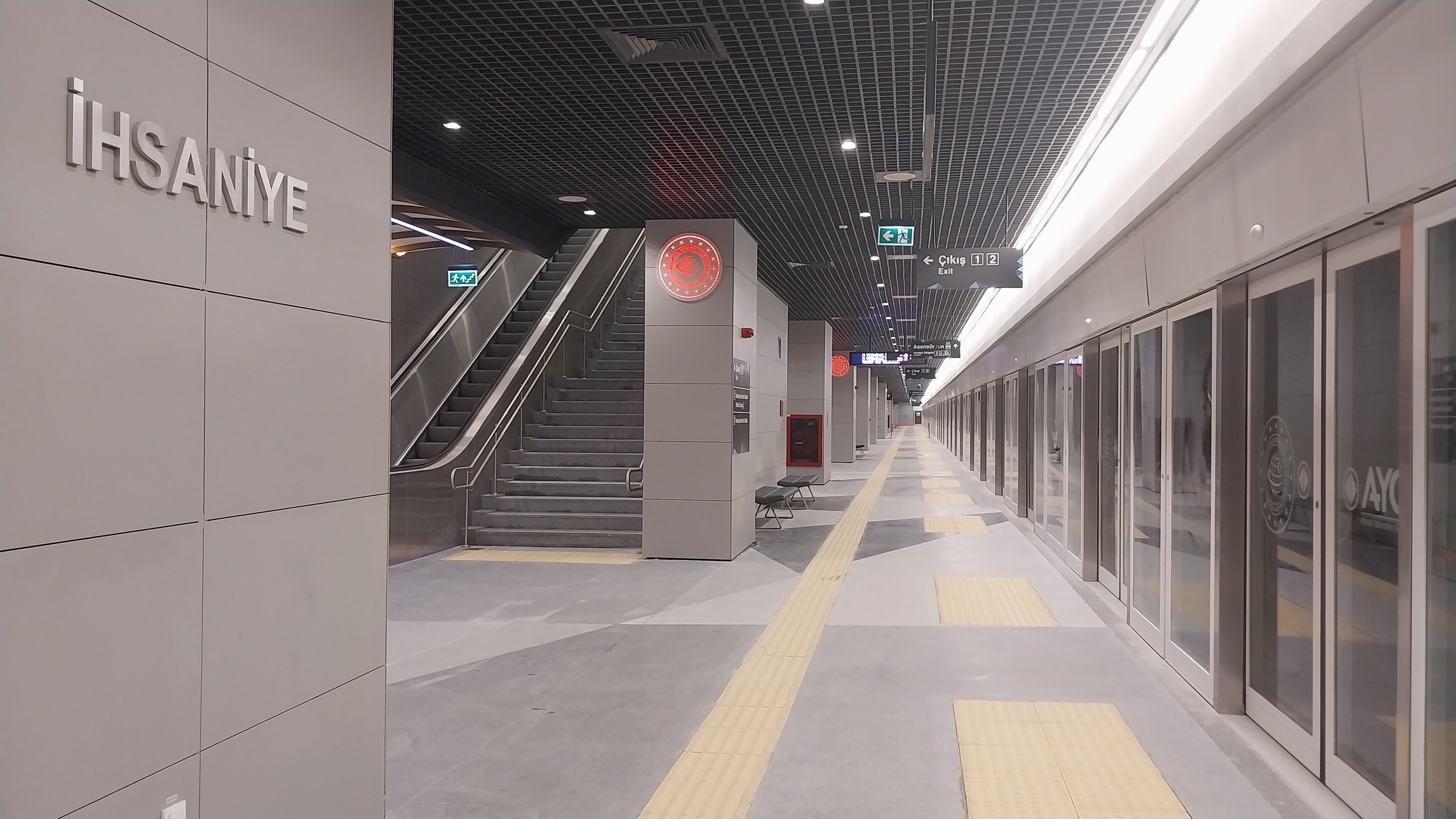
Platform
