= Hasdal station =

Metro station in Istanbul

Hasdal
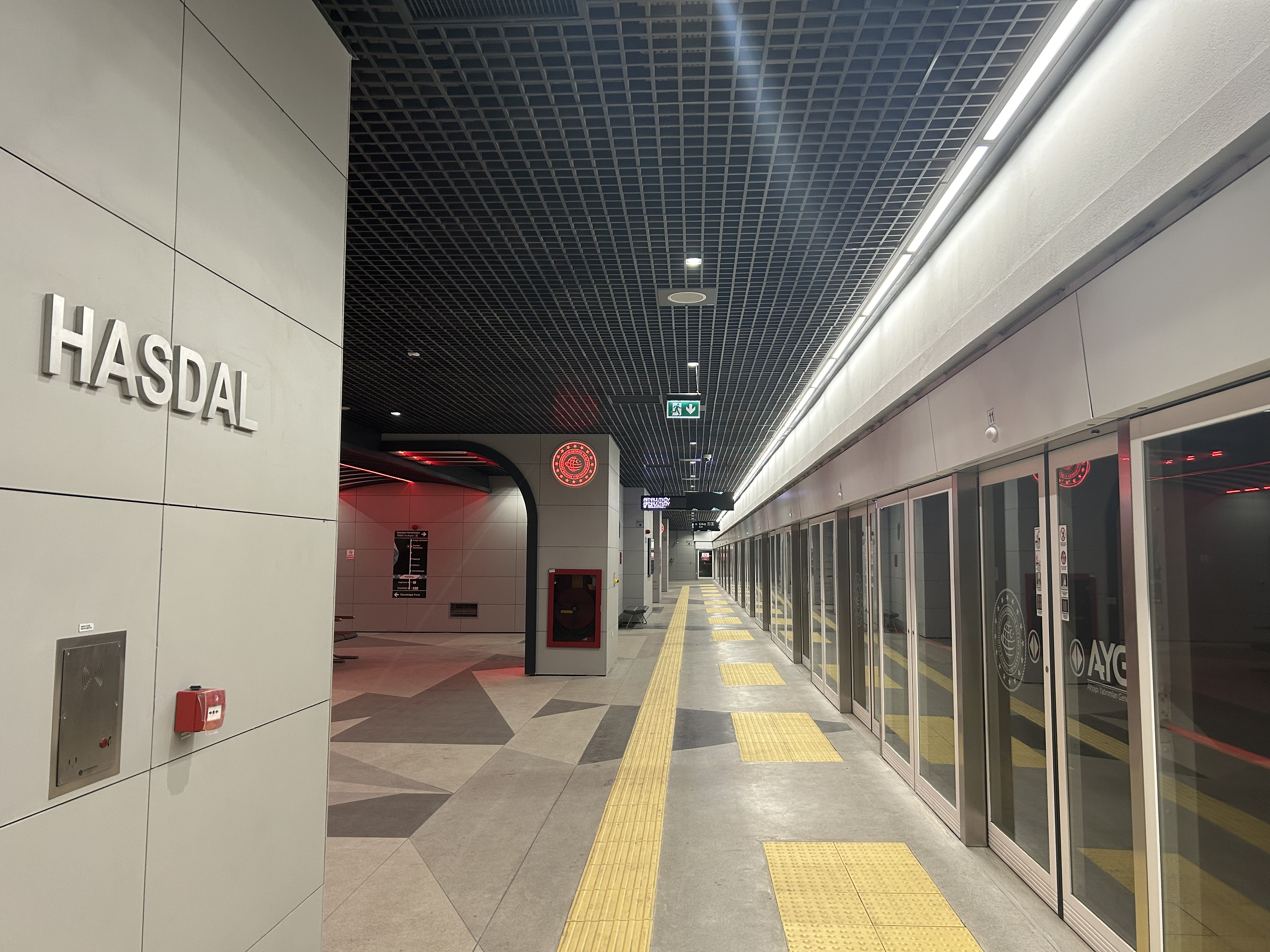
- Platform

General information
- Location: Mimar Sinan Neighborhood, D.020, 34075; Eyüp, Istanbul; Turkey
- Coordinates: 41°7′17″N 28°56′49″E
- System: Istanbul Metro rapid transit station
- Owner: Ministry of Transport and Infrastructure
- Operator: Istanbul Metro
- Line: M11
- Platforms: 1 Island platform
- Tracks: 2
- Connections: İETT Bus: Kıyı Emniyet Müdürlüğü İstasyonu 48, 50G, H-2, TM4

Construction
- Structure type: Underground
- Depth: 22 metres (72 ft)
- Platform levels: 3
- Parking: Yes
- Cycle facilities: Yes
- Accessible: Yes

History
- Opened: 22 January 2023 (3 years ago)
- Electrified: 1,500 V DC Overhead line

Services
Preceding station	Istanbul Metro	Following station
Kemerburgaz towards Halkalı	M11 Line	Kağıthane towards Gayrettepe
Location

Hasdal (or Hasdal University) is an underground station on the M11 line of the Istanbul Metro in Eyüp. The station was constructed using the cut and cover method.

Construction of the station began in 2016, along with the entire route from Gayrettepe to the Istanbul Airport. The station was opened on 22 January 2023.

It is located on the D.020 highway in the Eyüpsultan district’s Mimar Sinan neighborhood in Istanbul.

== Layout ==
Northbound	← toward Halkalı - Istanbul Airport (Kemerburgaz)
Island platform, doors will open on the left
Southbound	toward Gayrettepe (Kağıthane) →

== Operation information ==
The line operates between 06:00 and 00:40 and train frequency is 20 minutes. The line has no night service.

== Gallery ==
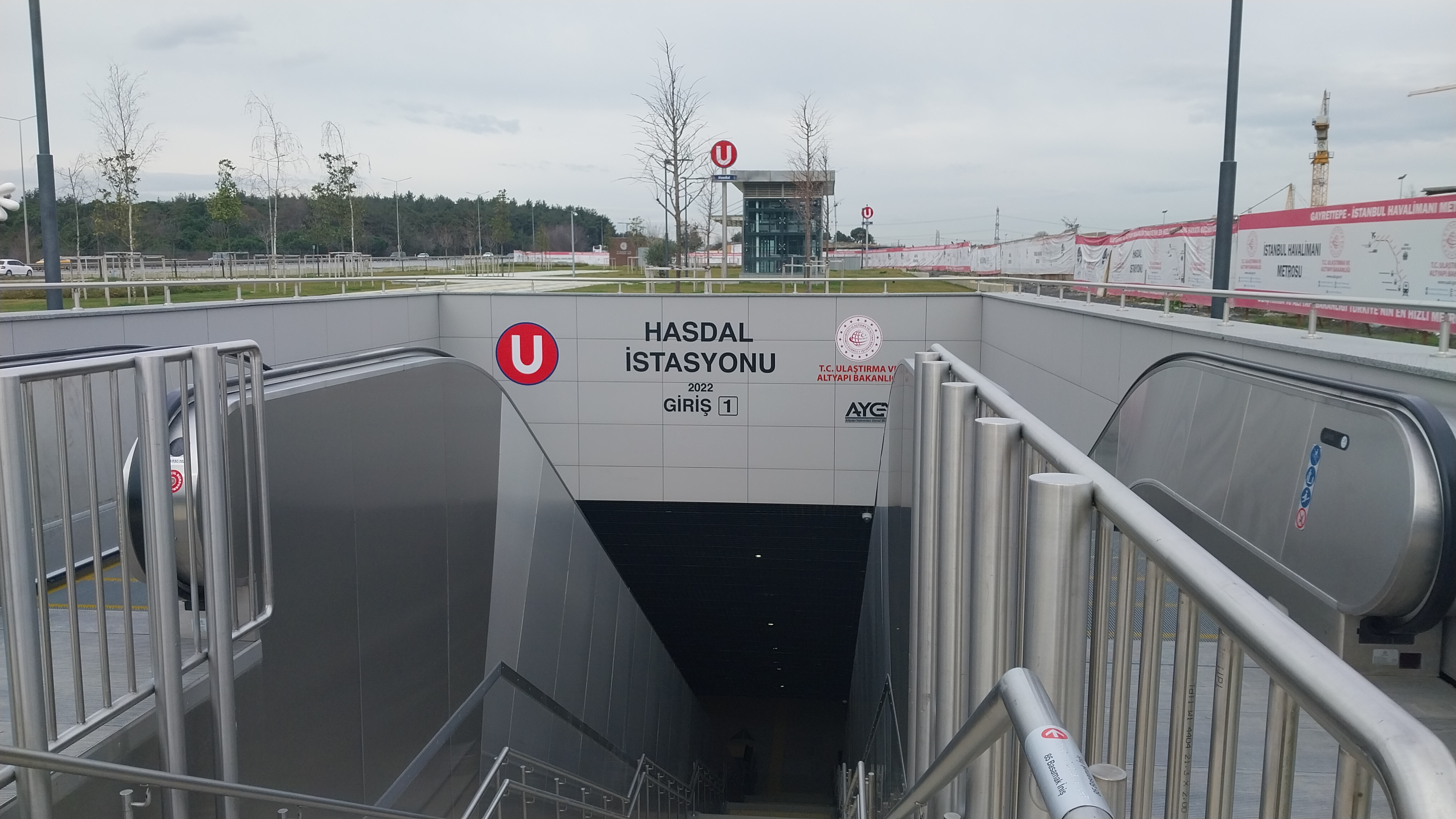
Entrance 1

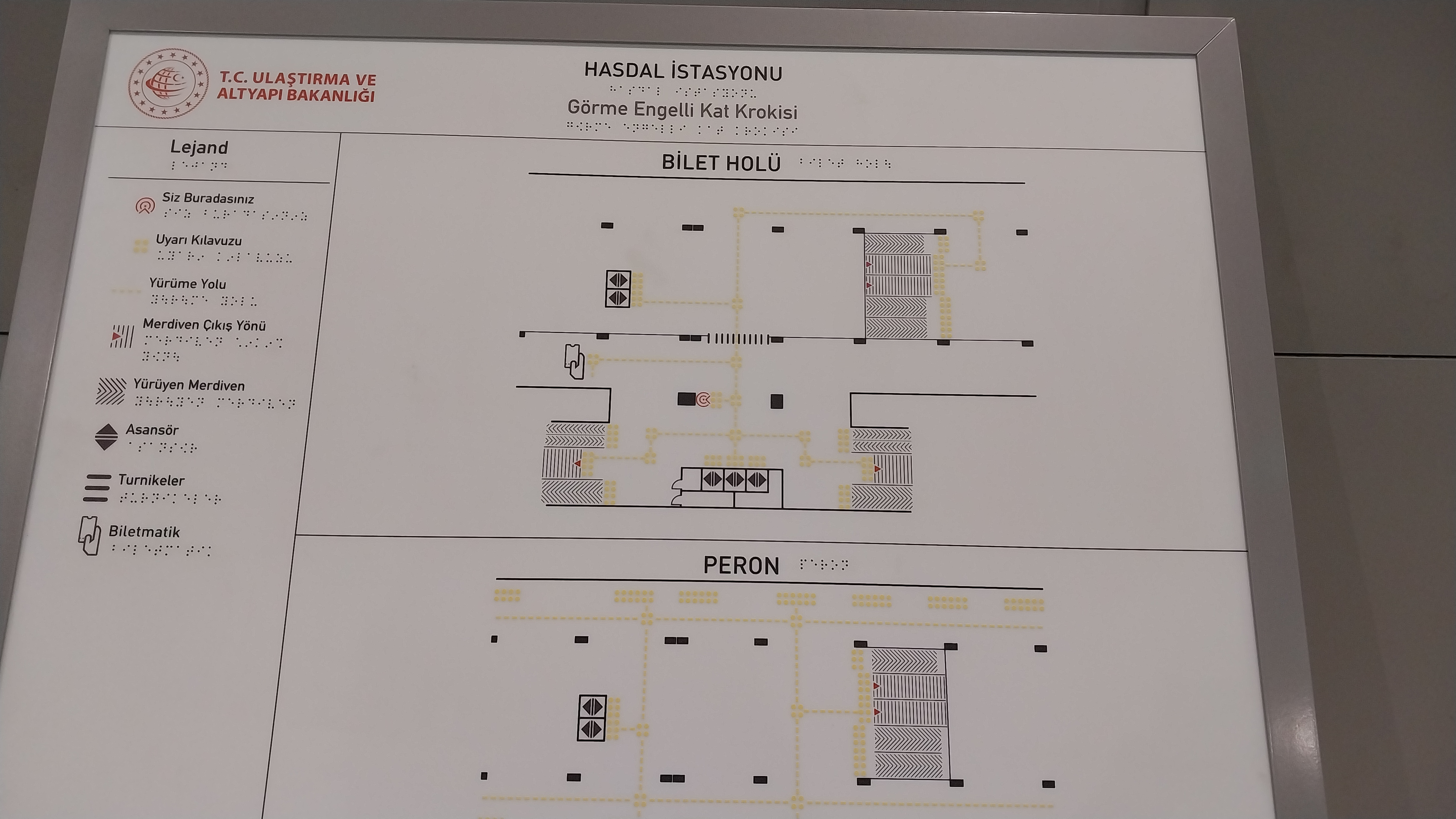
Station diagram

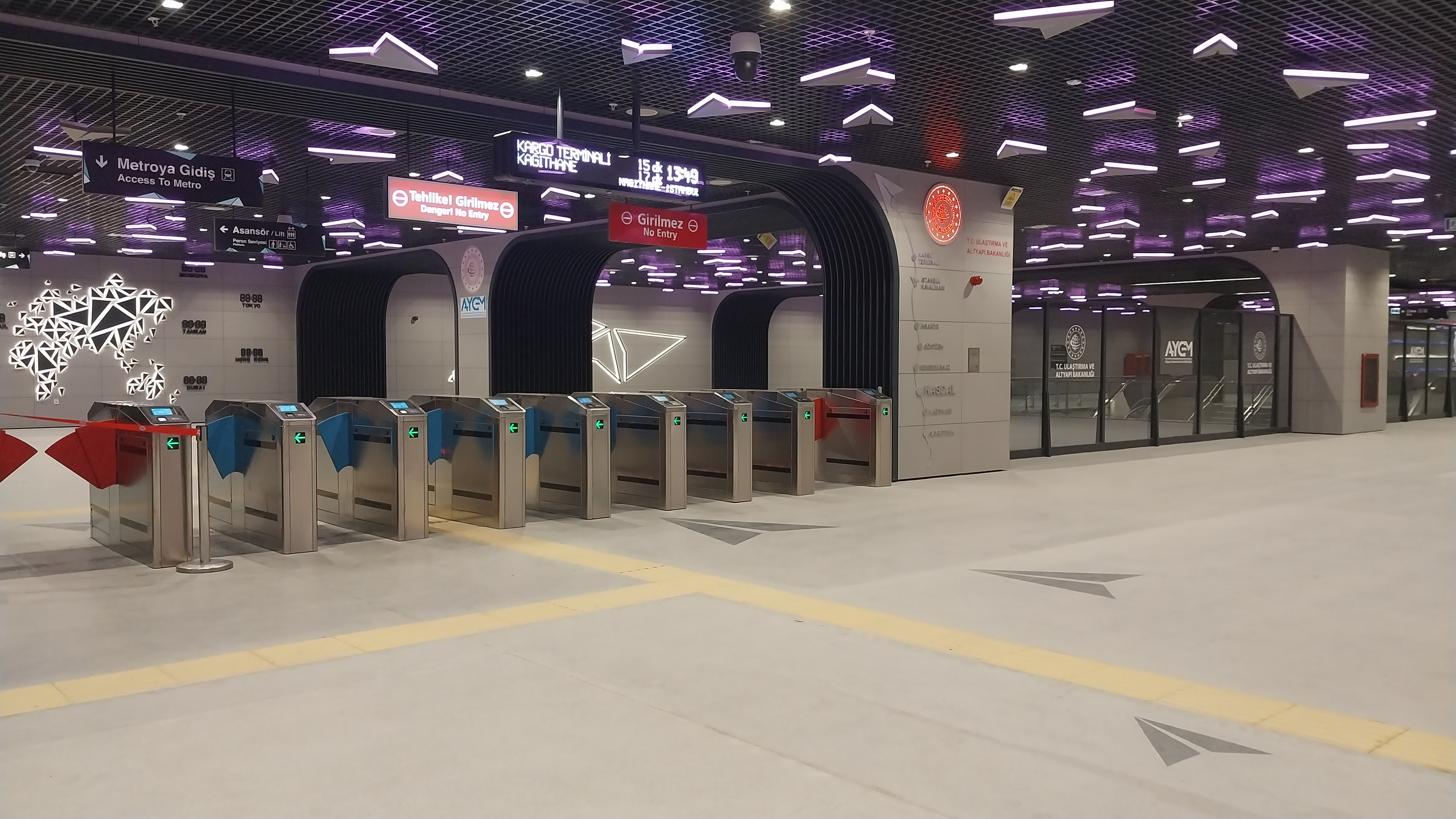
Ticket hall

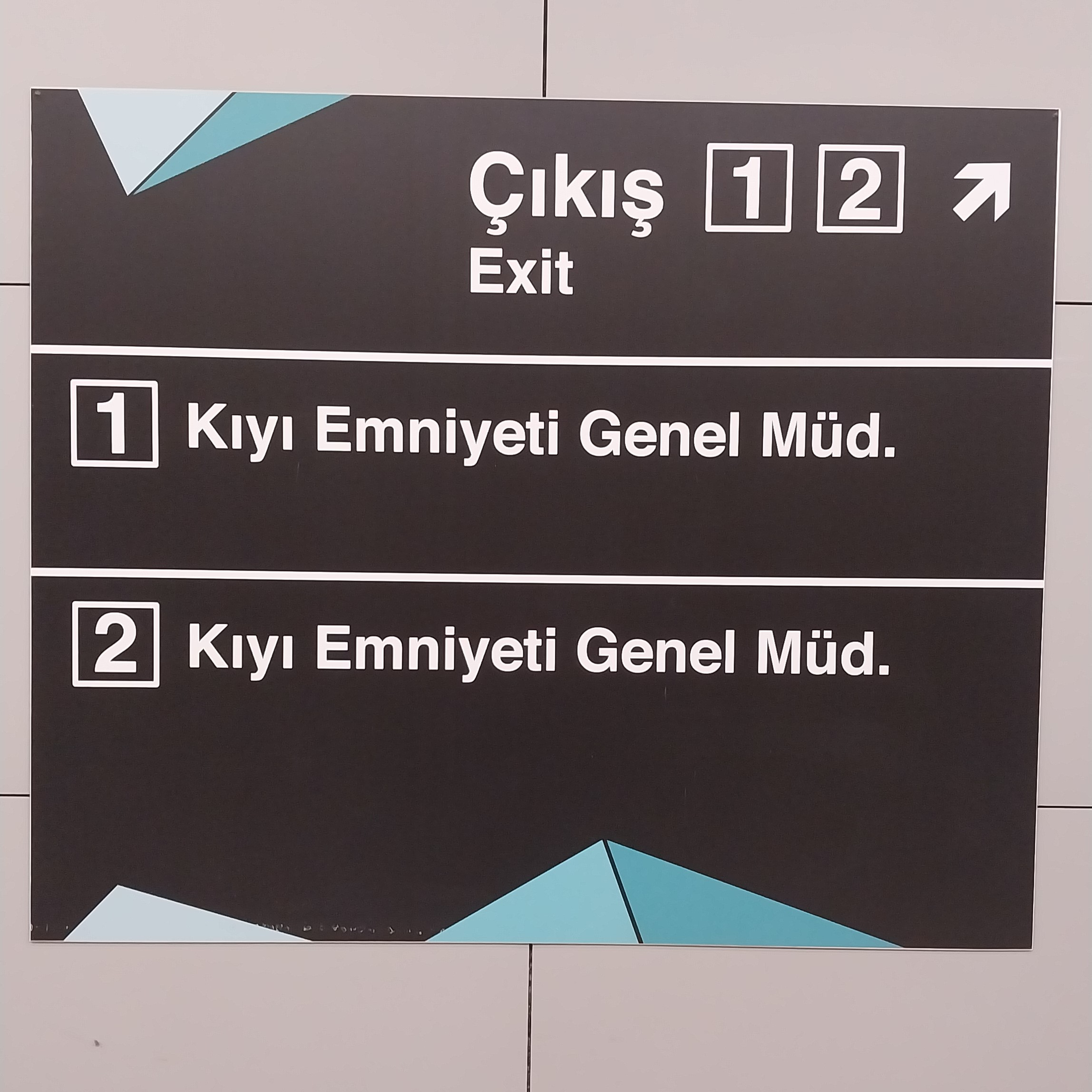
Exit sign

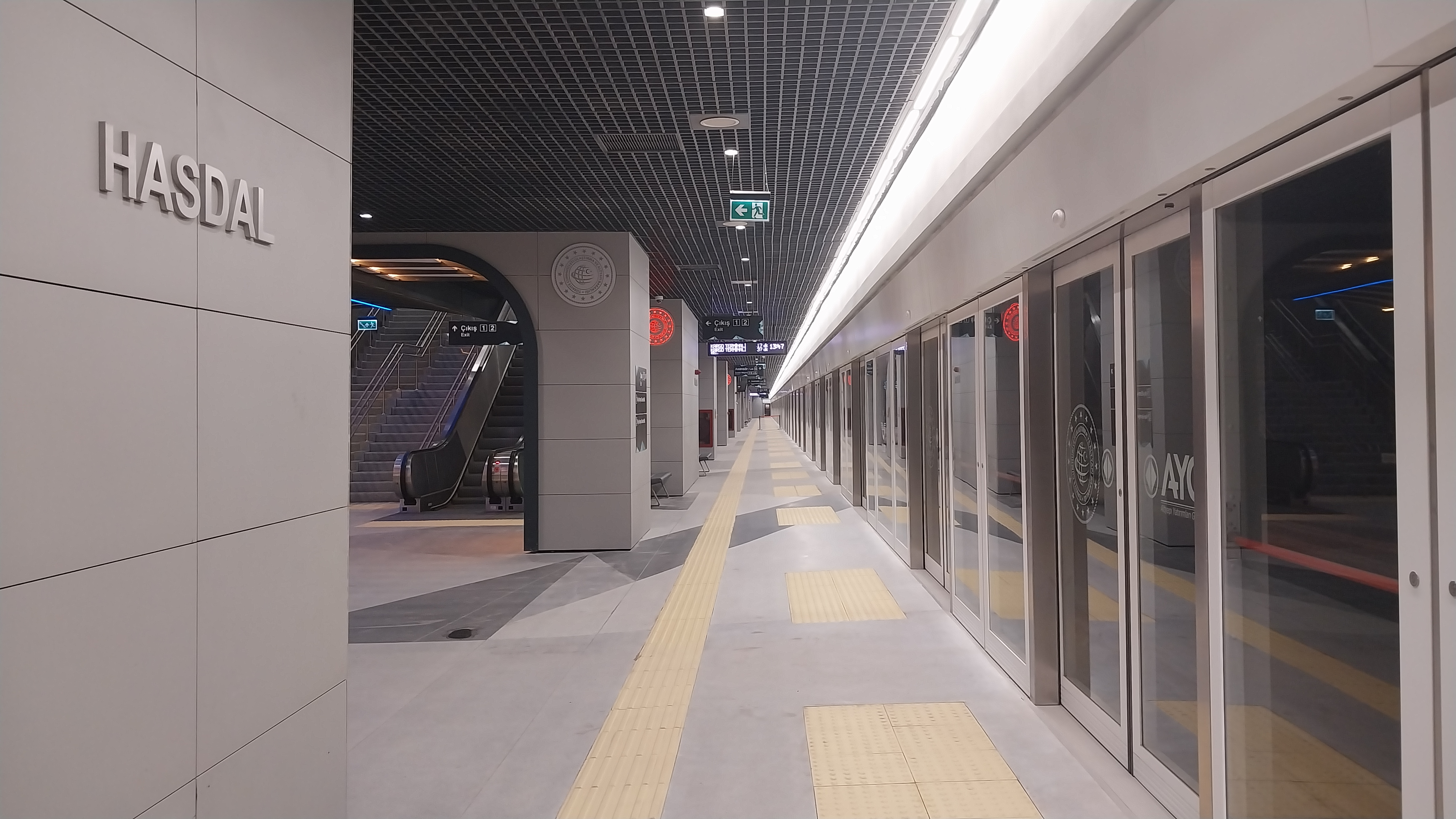
Platform

== Nearby points of interest ==
- Istanbul University Faculty of Medicine (Çapa) Hospital (under construction)
- General Directorate of Security
