= Göktürk station =

Metro station in Turkey

Göktürk
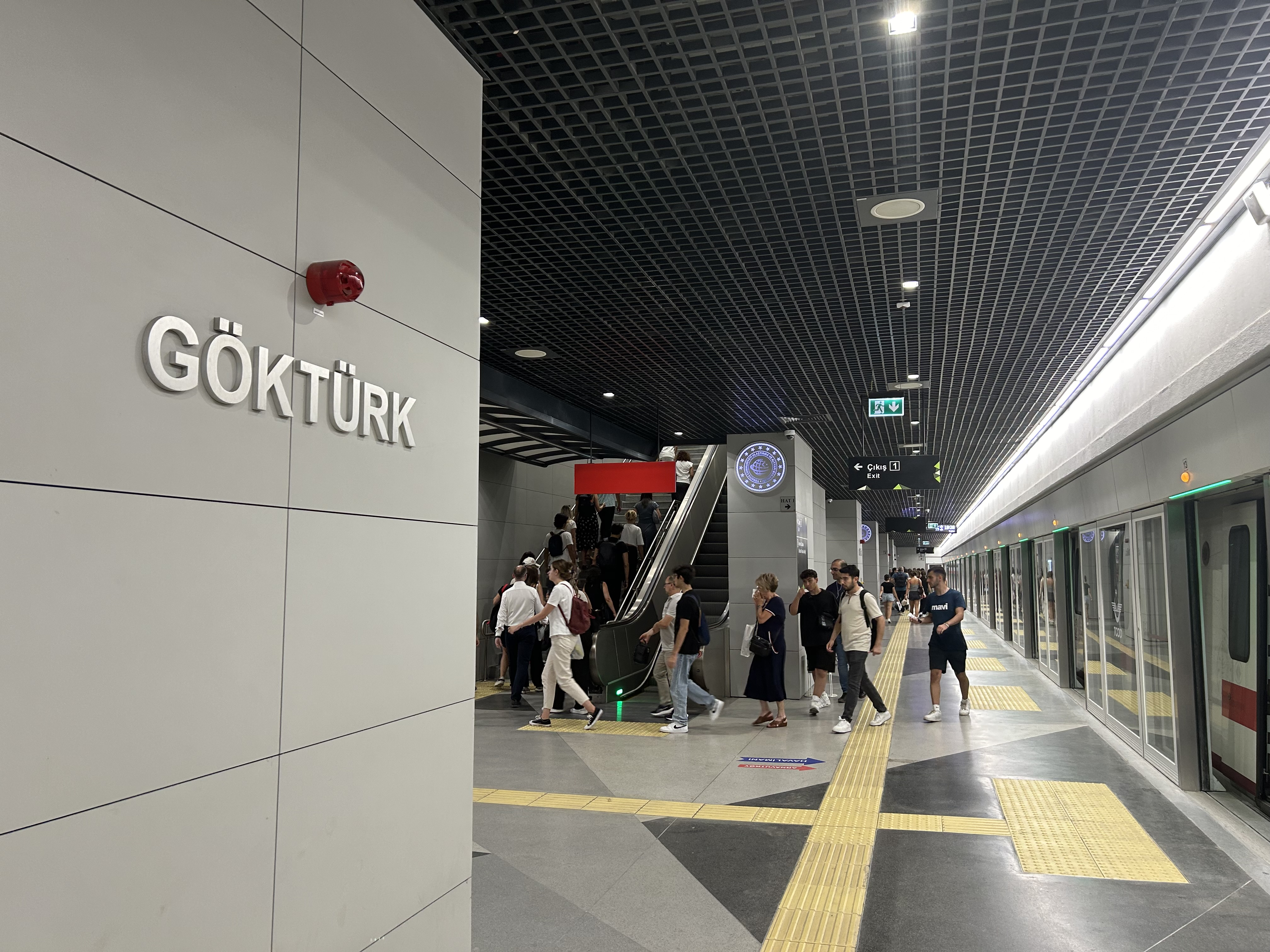
- Platform

General information
- Location: Göktürk Neighborhood, Göktürk Nursery, 34075; Eyüp, Istanbul; Turkey
- Coordinates: 41°10′37″N 28°53′2″E
- System: Istanbul Metro rapid transit station
- Owner: Ministry of Transport and Infrastructure
- Operator: Istanbul Metro
- Line: M11
- Platforms: 1 Island platform
- Tracks: 2
- Connections: İETT Bus: Göktürk Emniyet Amirliği: 48, 48C, 48D, 48G, 48K, 48KA, 48L, 48P, TM4; Istanbul Minibus: Kemerburgaz – Akpınar

Construction
- Structure type: Underground
- Depth: 22 metres (72 ft)
- Parking: Yes
- Cycle facilities: Yes
- Accessible: Yes

History
- Opened: 22 January 2023 (3 years ago)
- Electrified: 1,500 V DC Overhead line

Services
Preceding station	Istanbul Metro	Following station
İhsaniye towards Halkalı	M11 Line	Kemerburgaz towards Gayrettepe
Location

Göktürk is an underground station on the M11 line of the Istanbul Metro in Eyüp. It has one entrance located on Atatürk Street in the Göktürk Tree Plantation in the town of Göktürk, Eyüp district, Turkey. The station is among the first five metro stations to be located outside of the city (urban area) of Istanbul.

Construction of the station began in 2016, along with the entire route from Gayrettepe to the Istanbul Airport.

The station was opened on along the rest of the M11 line on 22 January 2023.

== Layout ==
Northbound	← toward Halkalı - Istanbul Airport (İhsaniye)
Island platform, doors will open on the left
Southbound	toward Gayrettepe (Kemerburgaz) →

== Operation information ==
The line operates between 06:00 and 00:40 and train frequency is 20 minutes. The line has no night service.

== Gallery ==
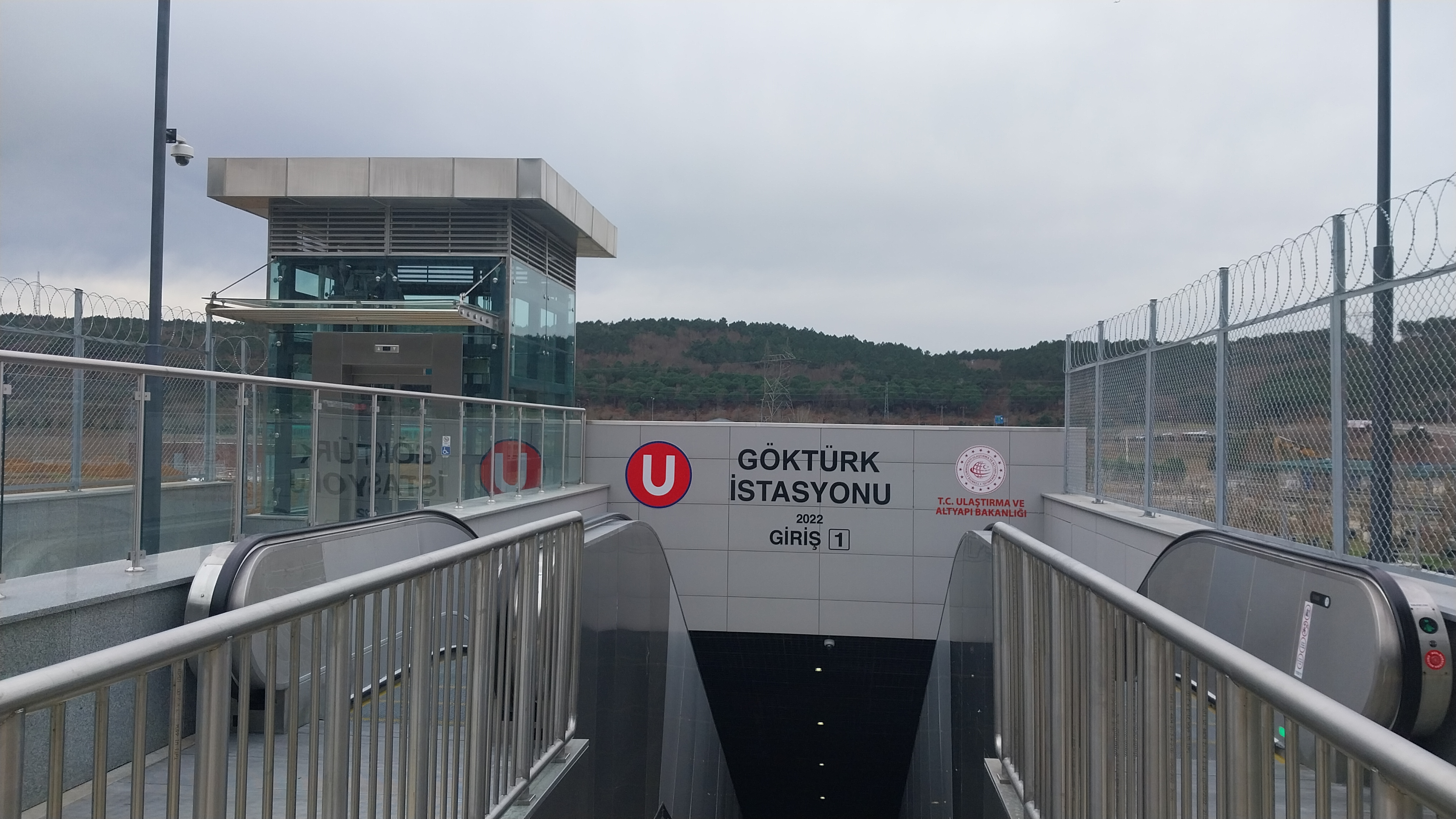
Entrance 1

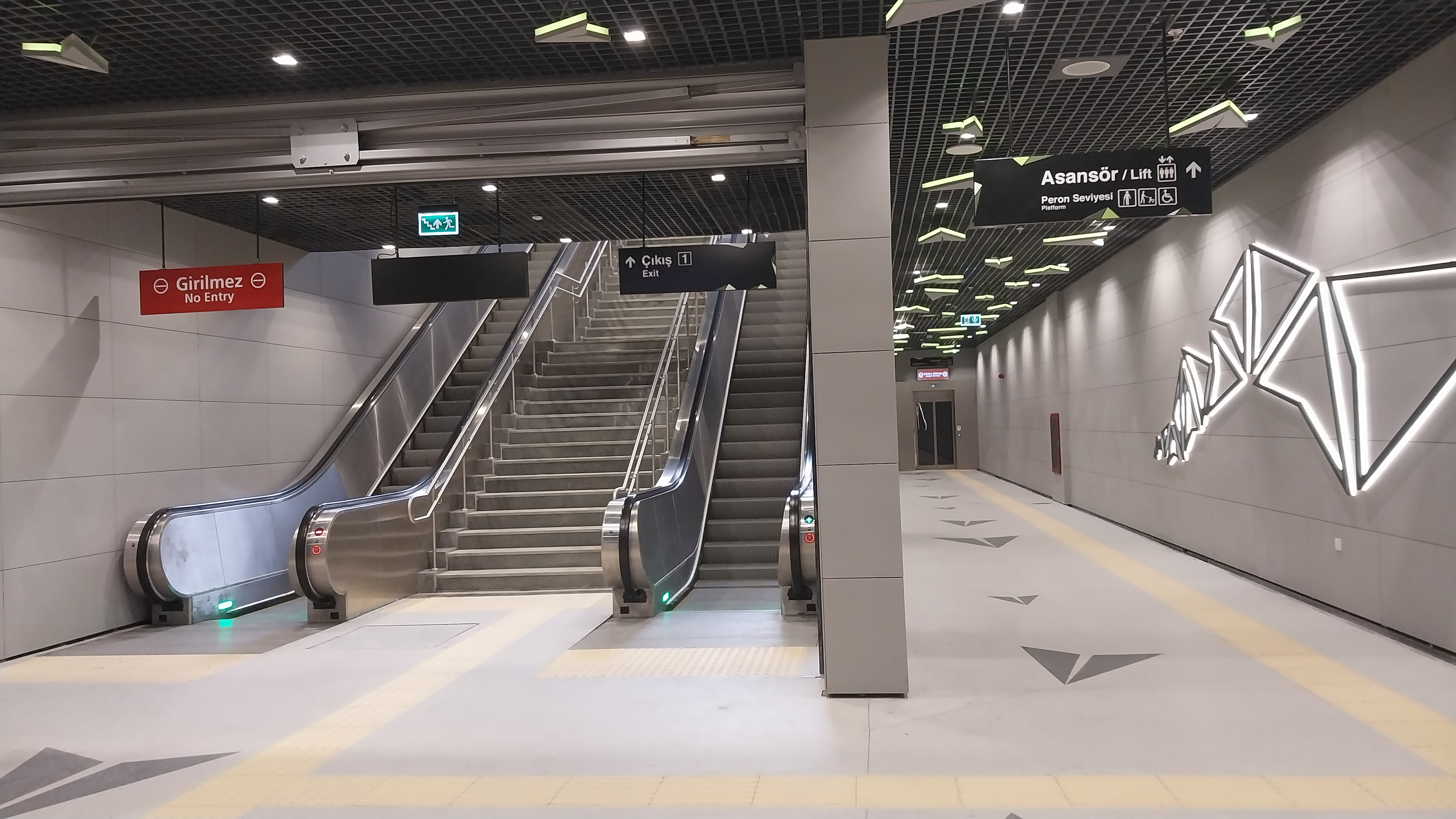
Exit 1

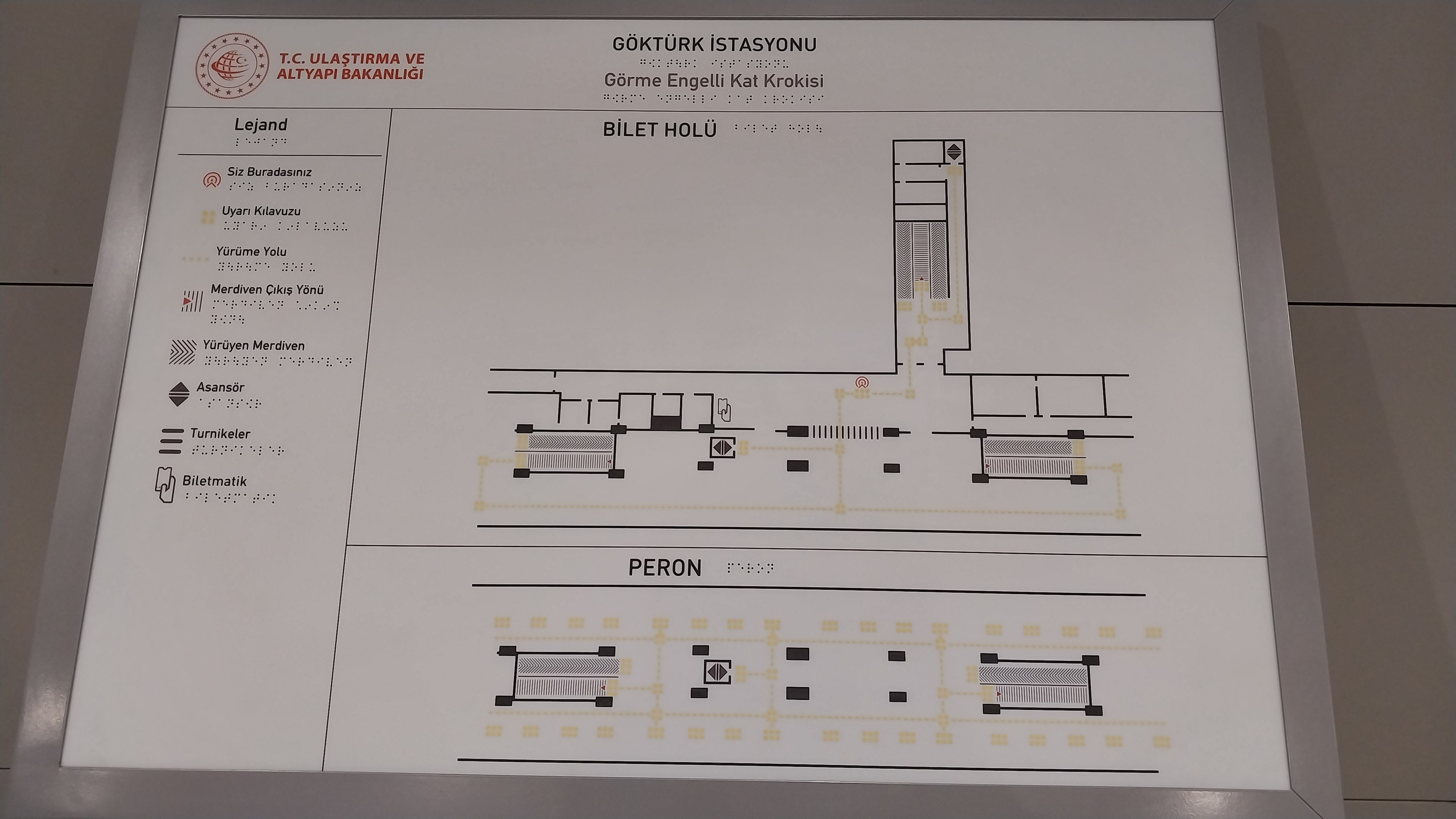
Station diagram

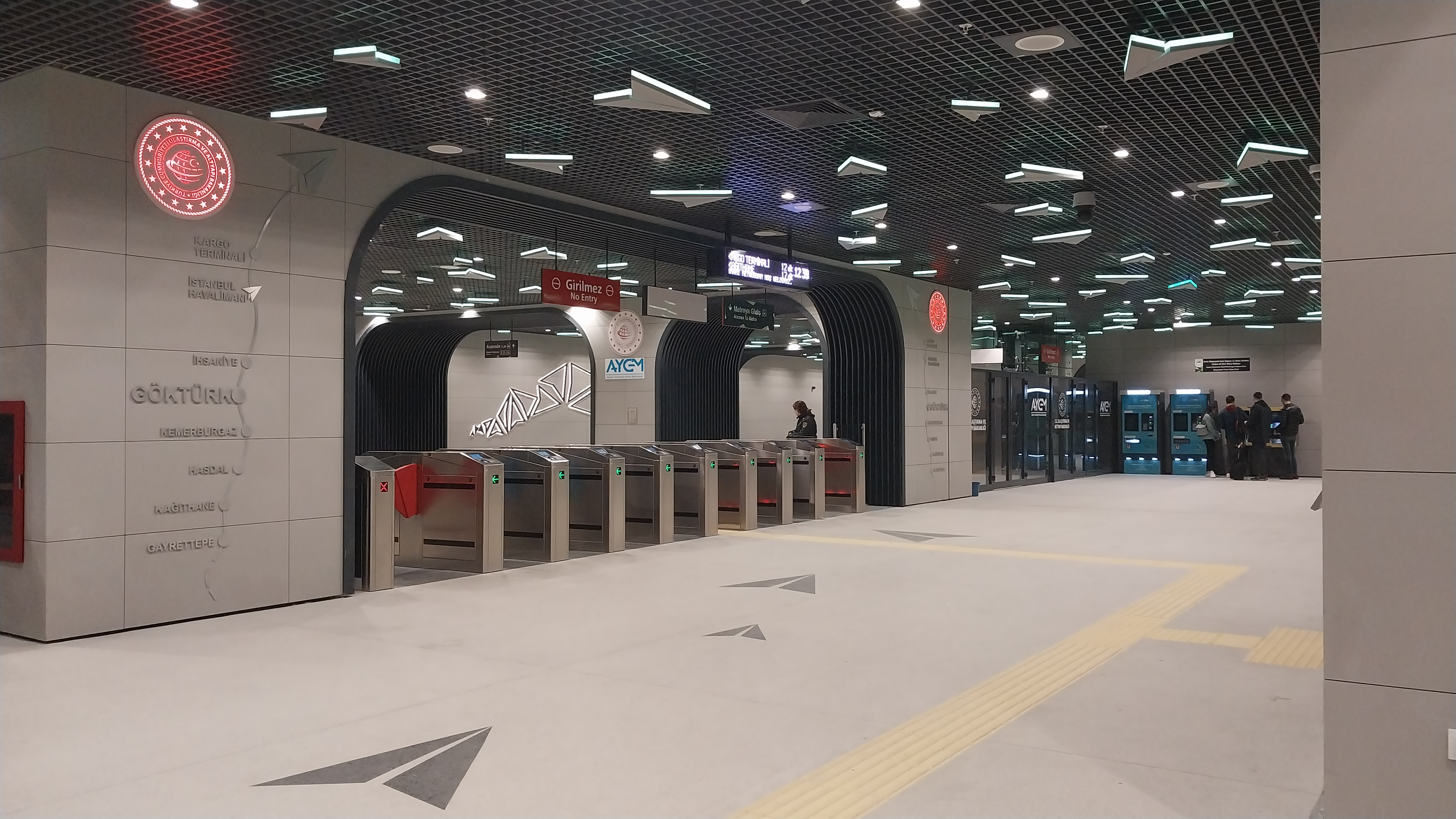
Ticket hall

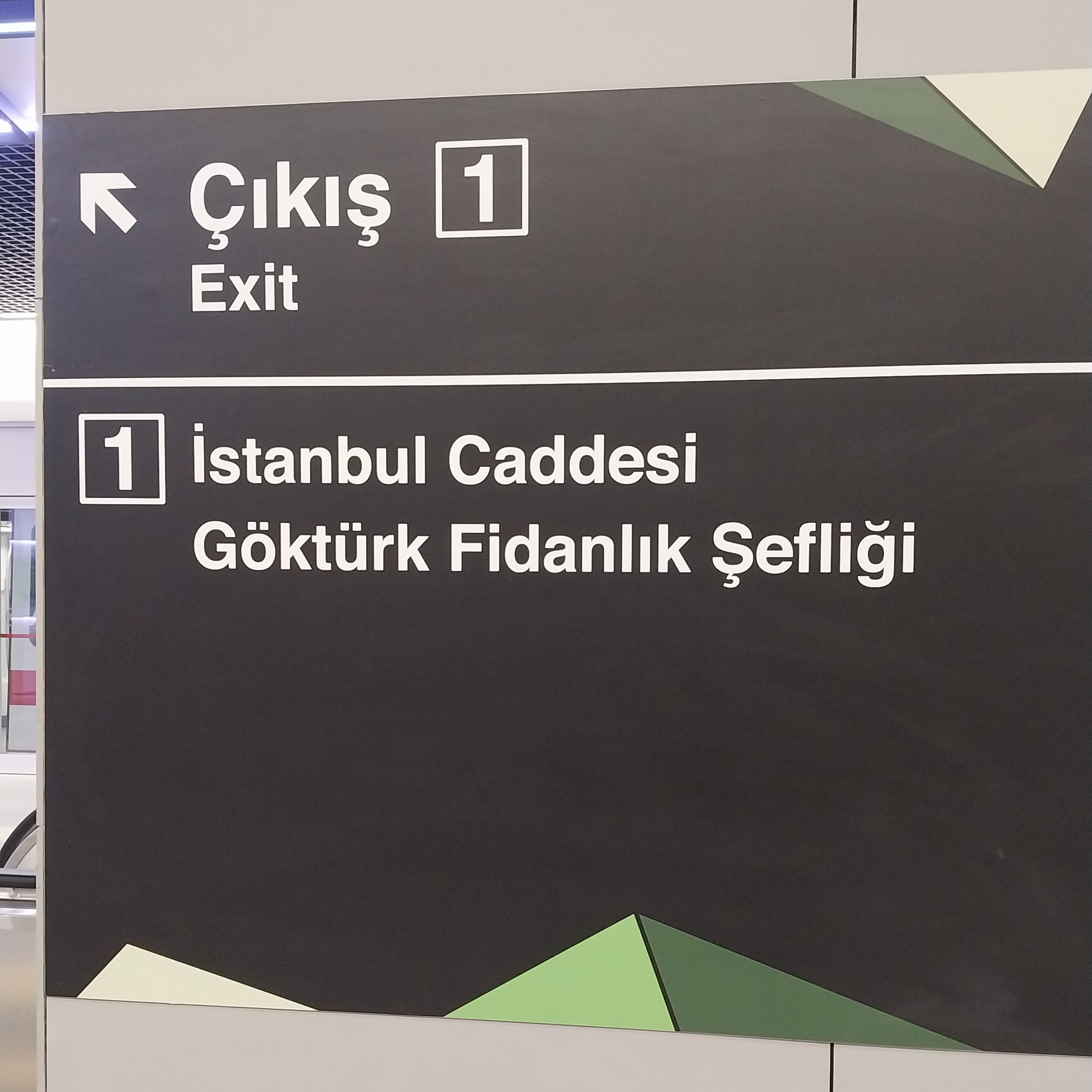
Exit sign

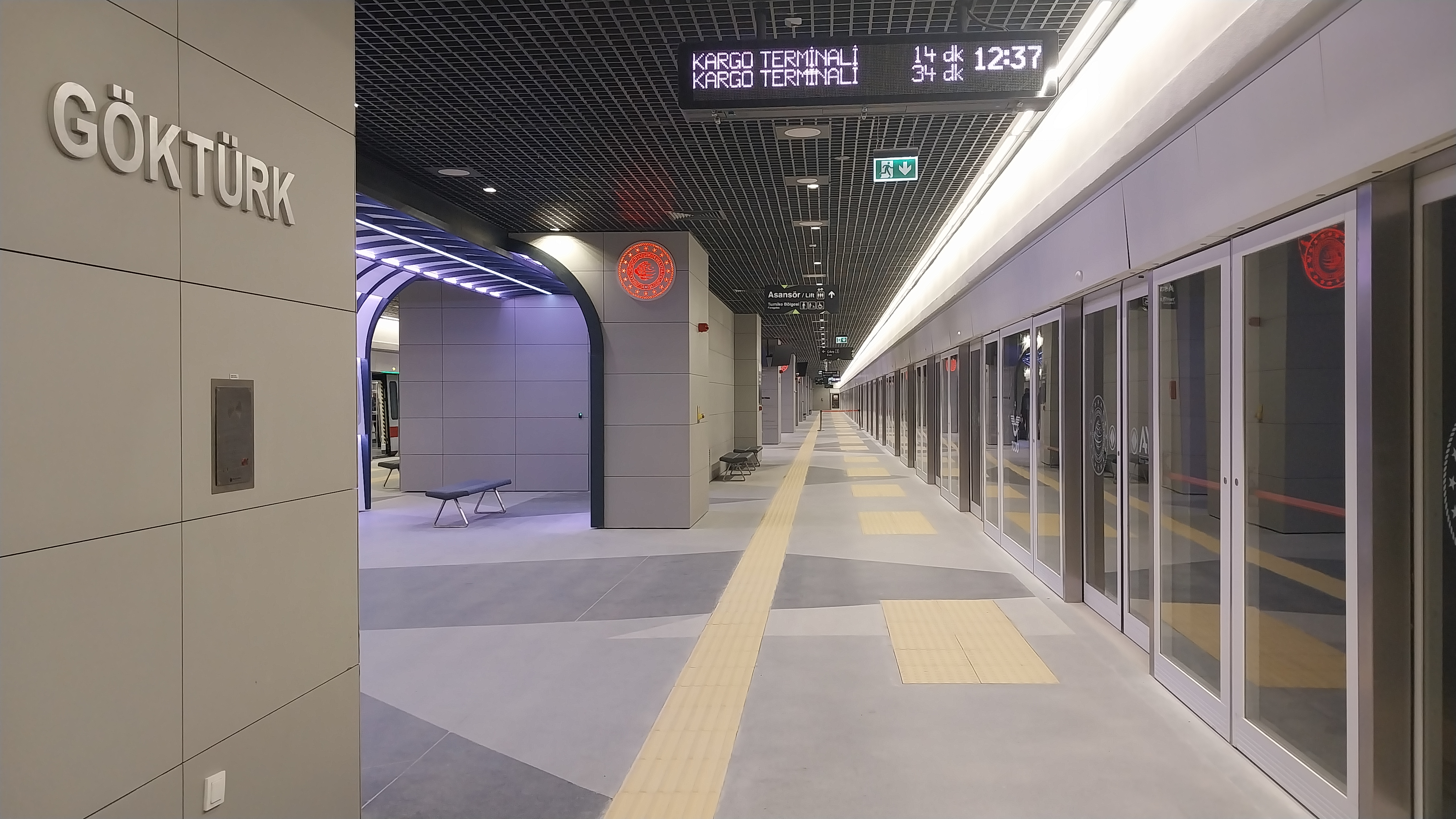
Platform
