= Kemerburgaz station =

Kemerburgaz
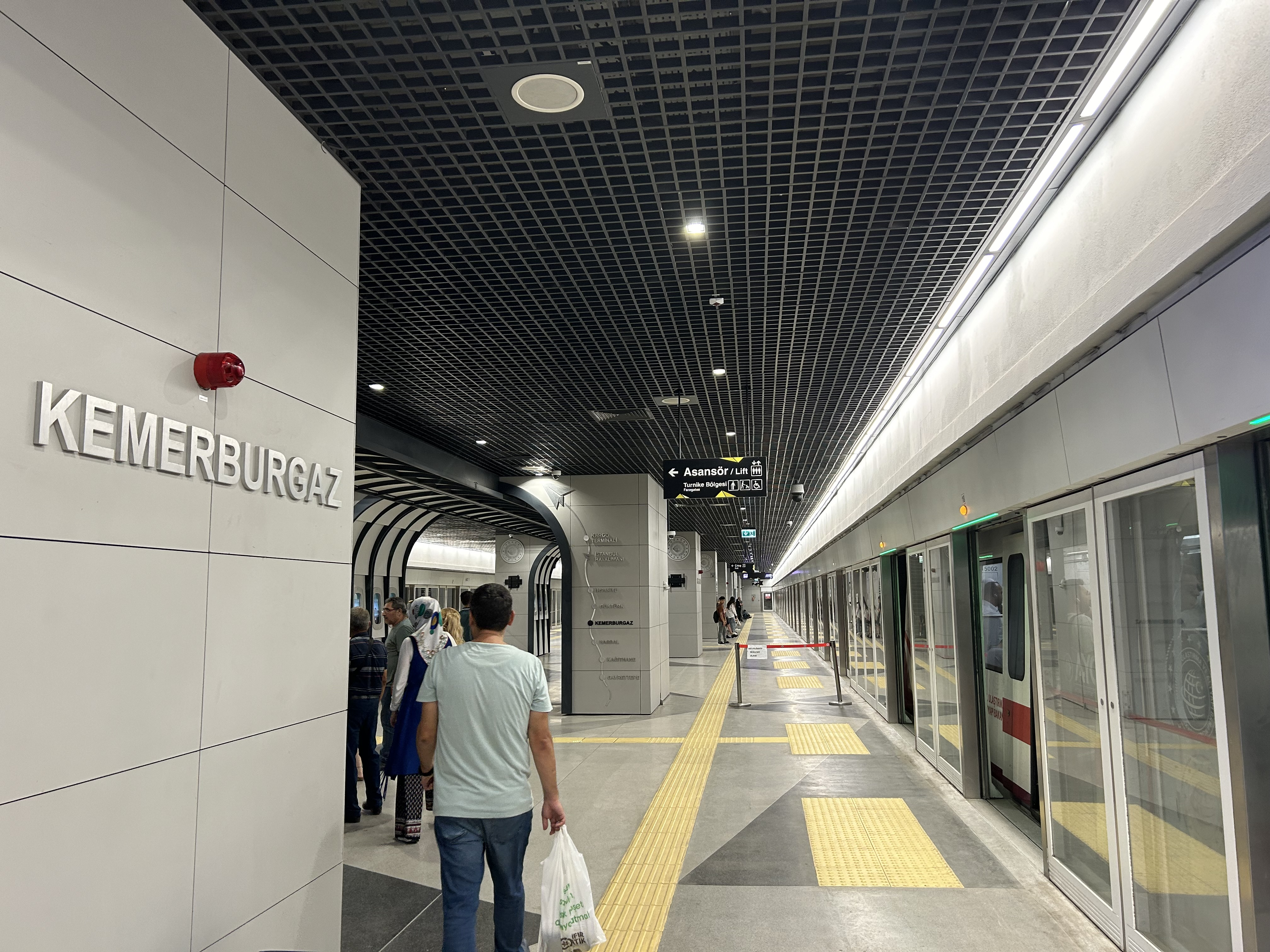
- Platform

General information
- Location: Mithatpaşa Neighborhood, Selanik Boulevard, 34075; Eyüp, Istanbul; Turkey
- Coordinates: 41°9′34″N 28°54′37″E
- System: Istanbul Metro rapid transit station
- Owner: Istanbul Metropolitan Municipality
- Operator: Istanbul Metro
- Line: M11
- Platforms: 1 Island platform
- Tracks: 2
- Connections: İETT Bus: Kemerburgaz: 48, 48A, 48L, 50G, TM4; Kemerburgaz Metro: 48C, 48D, 48G, 48K, 48KA, 48P, 48U, D2; Istanbul Minibus: Gaziosmanpaşa-Eyüpsultan-Göktürk, Şişli-Göktürk, Kemerburgaz-Akpınar

Construction
- Structure type: Underground
- Parking: Yes
- Cycle facilities: Yes
- Accessible: Yes

History
- Opened: 22 January 2023 (3 years ago)
- Electrified: 1,500 V DC Overhead line

Services
Preceding station	Istanbul Metro	Following station
Göktürk towards Halkalı	M11 Line	Hasdal towards Gayrettepe
Location

Kemerburgaz is an underground station on the M11 line of the Istanbul Metro in Eyüp. It is located below Selanik Boulevard on the west side of the town of Kemerburgaz. The station was opened on 22 January 2023 and is among the first five metro stations to be located outside of the city (urban area) of Istanbul.

Construction of the station began in 2016, along with the entire route from Gayrettepe to the Istanbul Airport.

On 19 January 2024, during the construction of piles on the surface between Kemerburgaz and Göktürk, the drilling machine pierced the tunnel wall and damaged the rails and catenary line. Due to the repair caused by this damage, the northbound platform was temporarily out of use as a single line operation is provided between Hasdal and Göktürk.

== Layout ==
Northbound	← toward Halkalı - Istanbul Airport (Göktürk)
Island platform, doors will open on the left
Southbound	toward Gayrettepe (Hasdal) →

== Operation information ==
The line operates between 06:00 and 00:40 and train frequency is 20 minutes. The line has no night service.

== Gallery ==
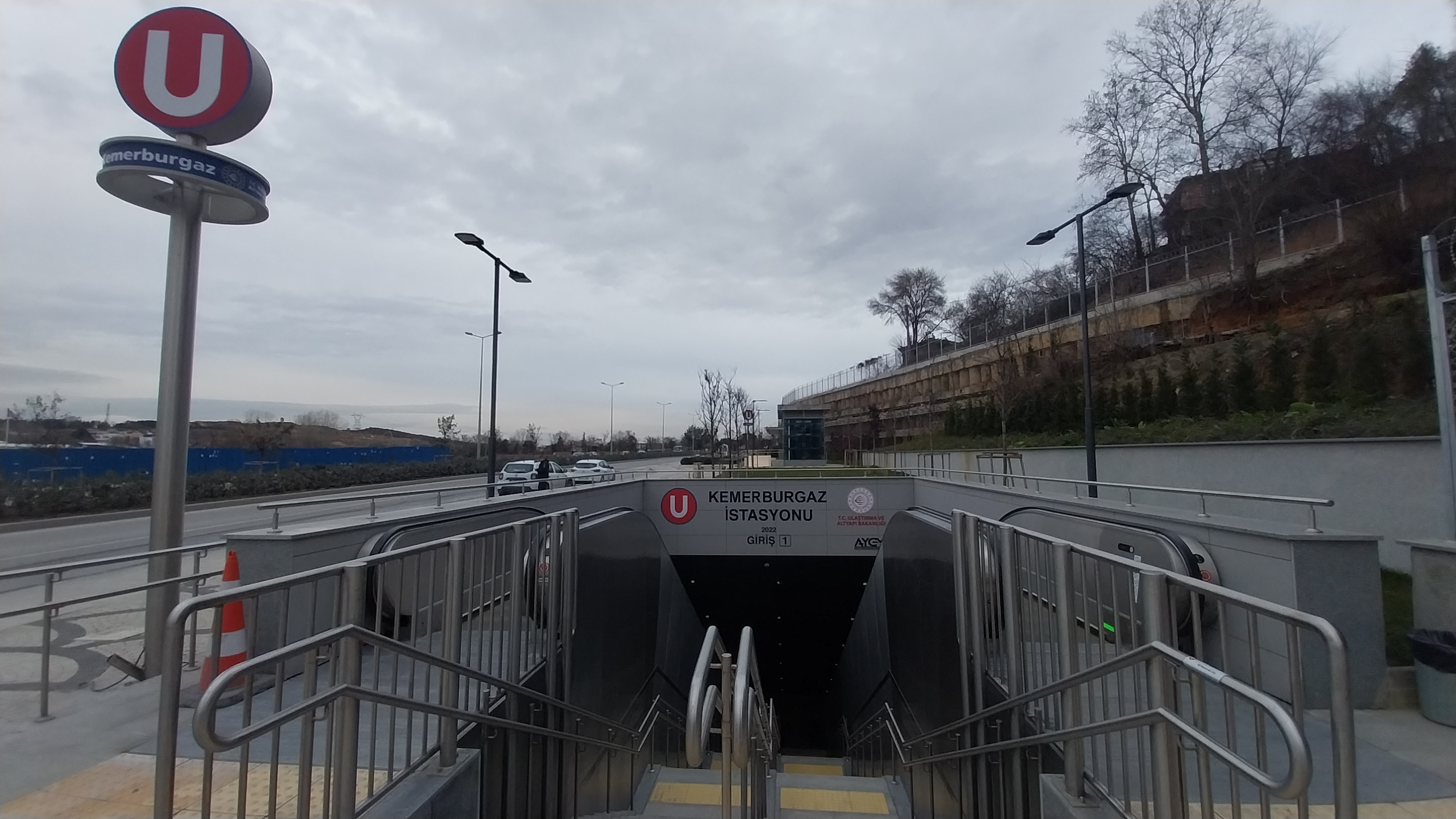
Entrance 1

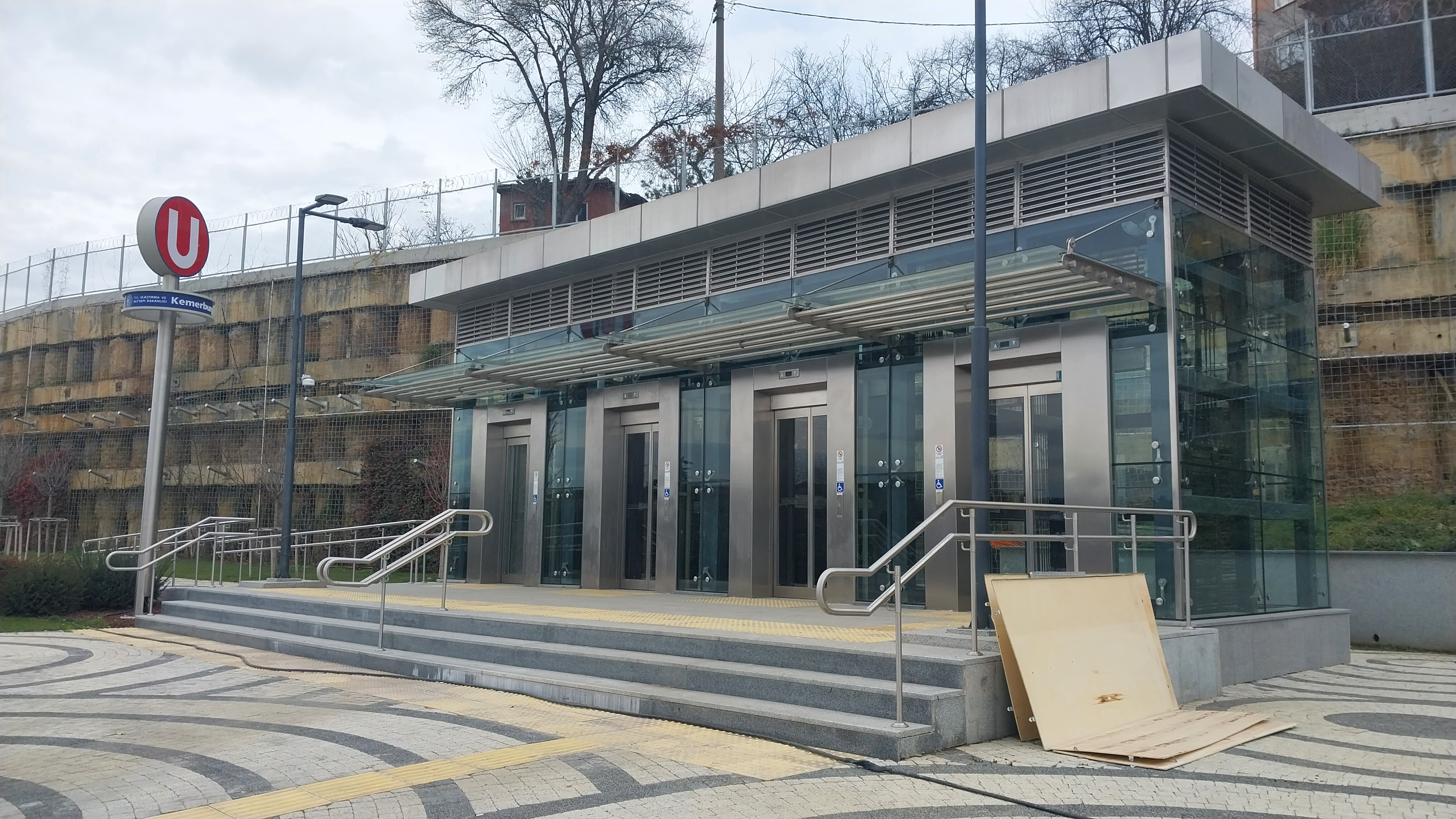
Elevators

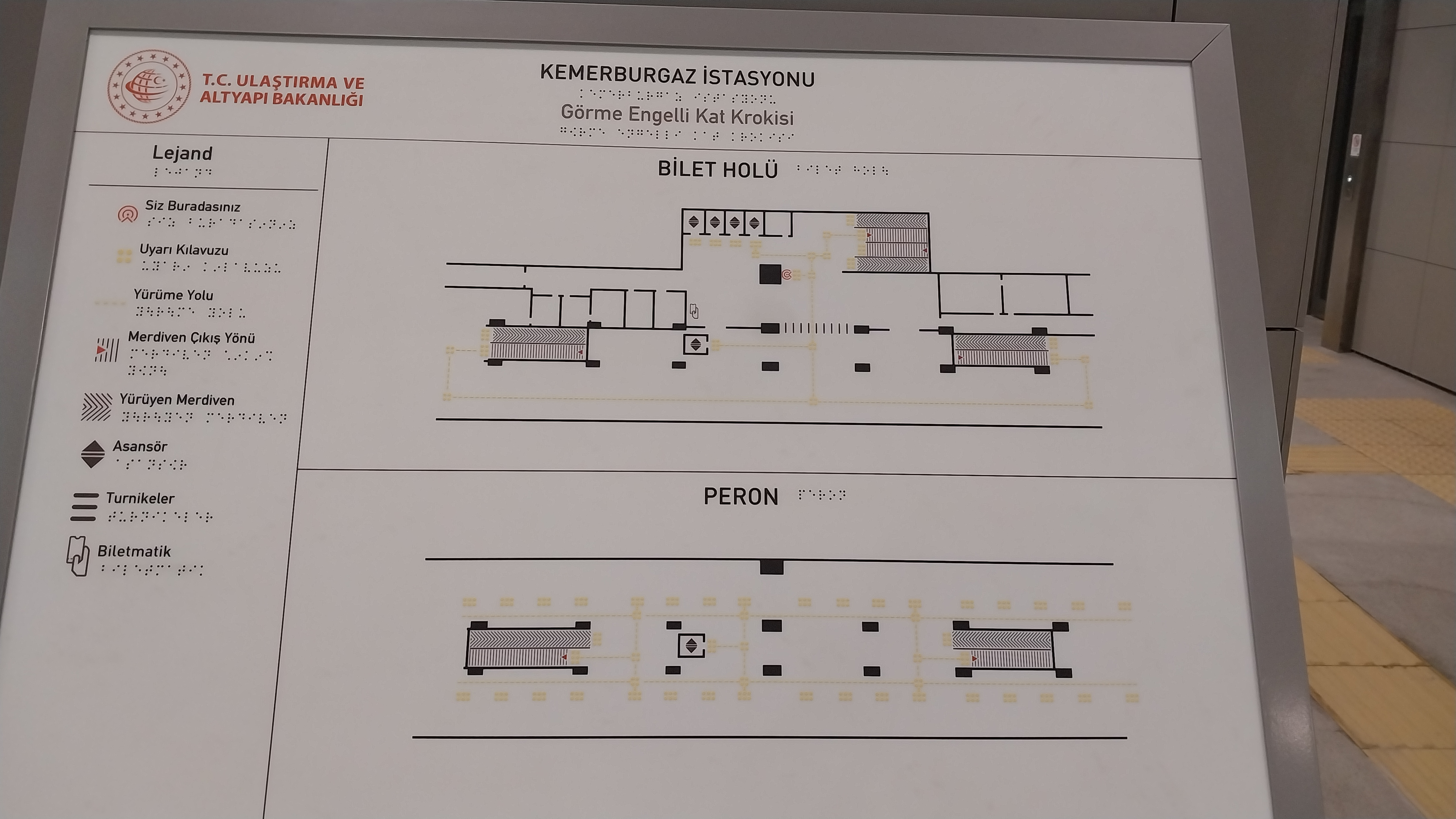
Station diagram

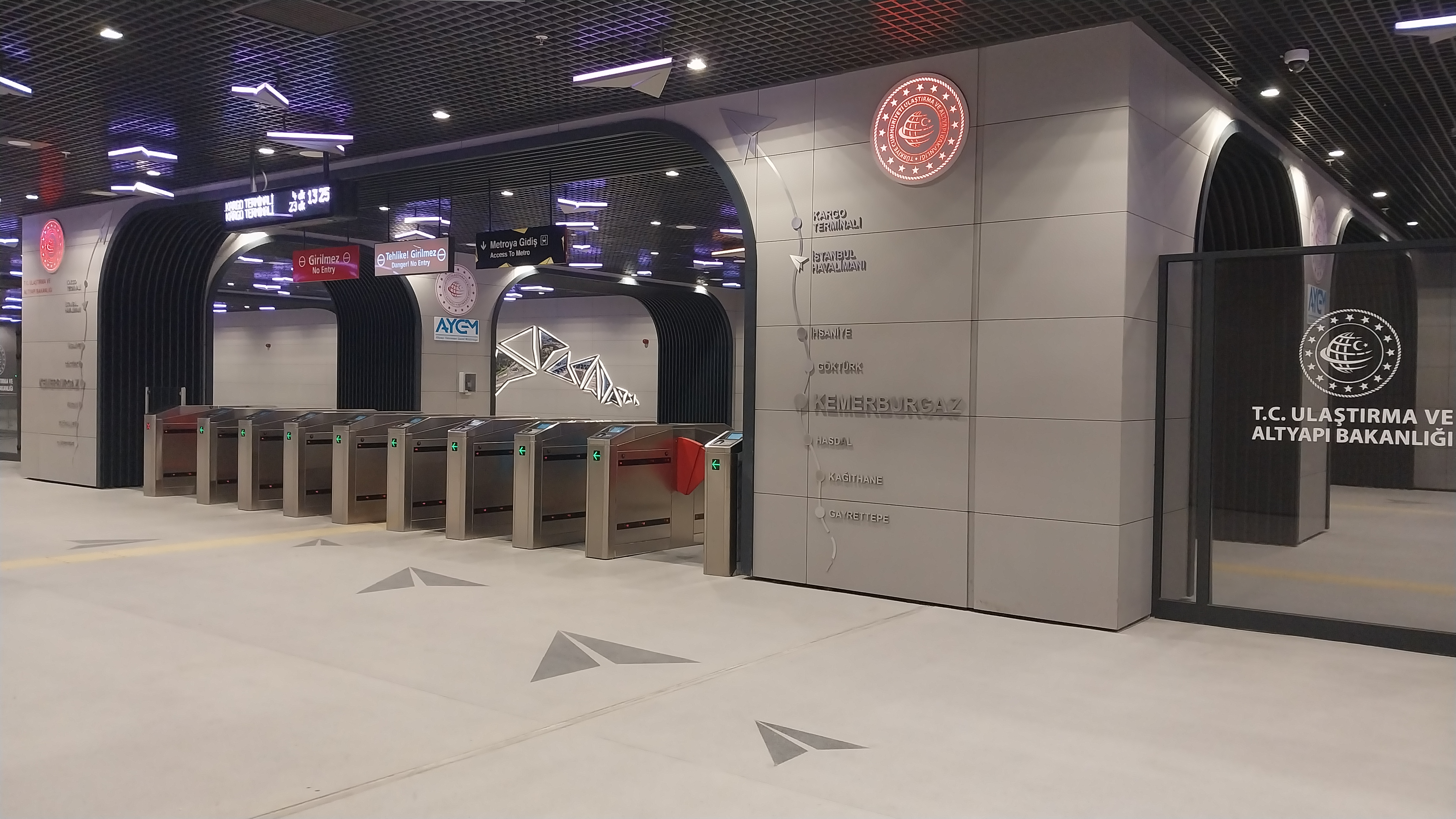
Ticket hall

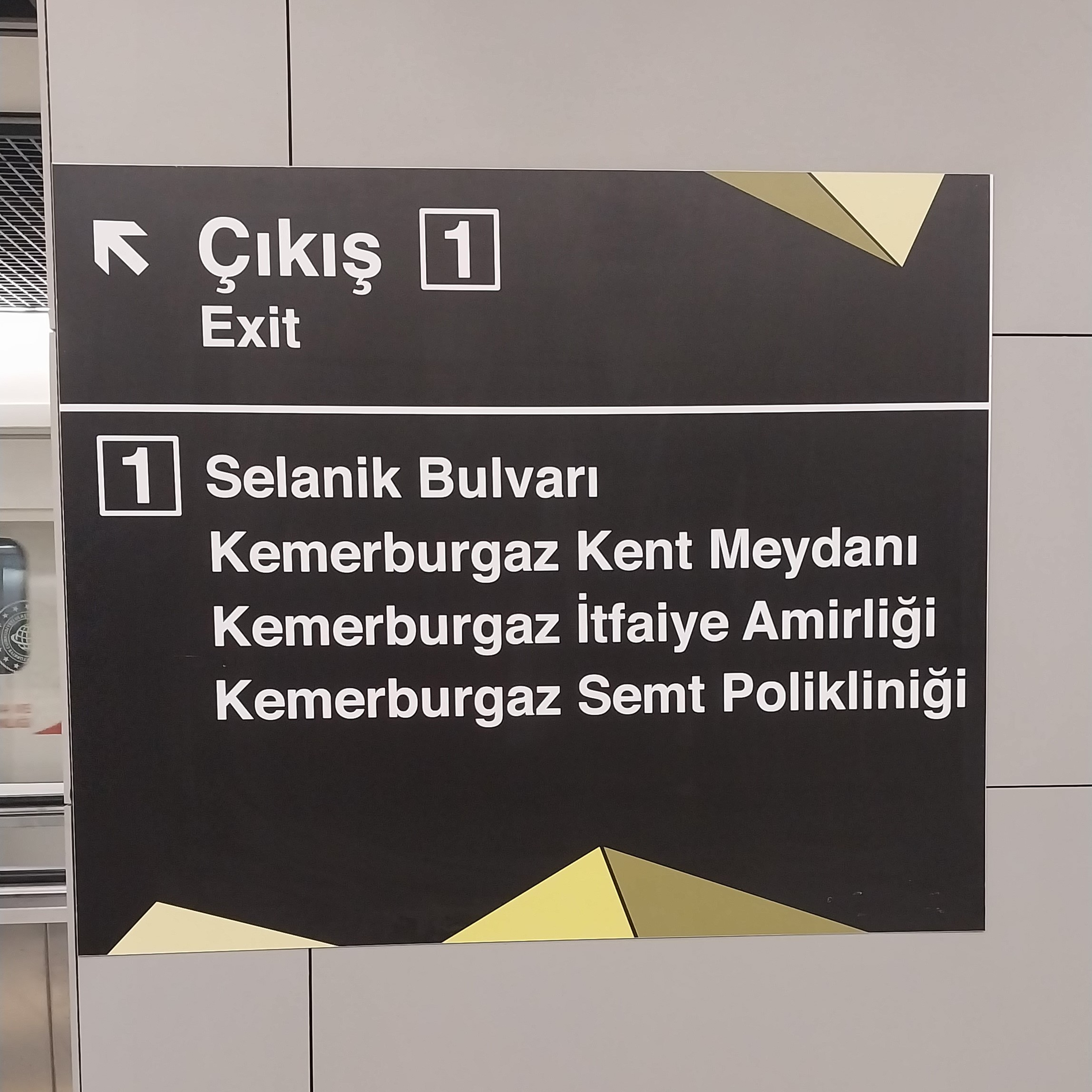
Exit sign

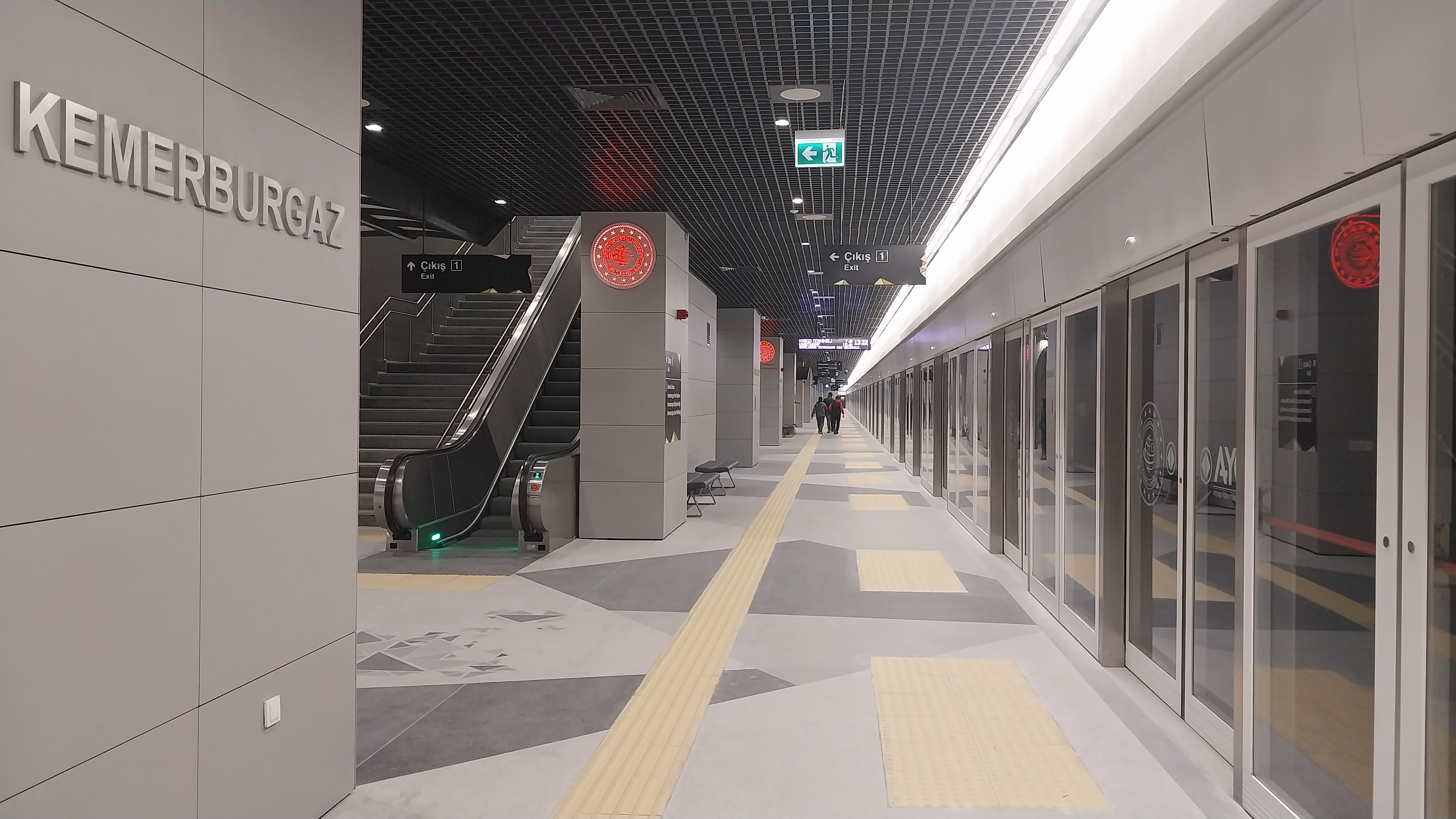
Platform
