= Olimpiyatköy station =

Station of the Istanbul Metro

Olimpiyatköy
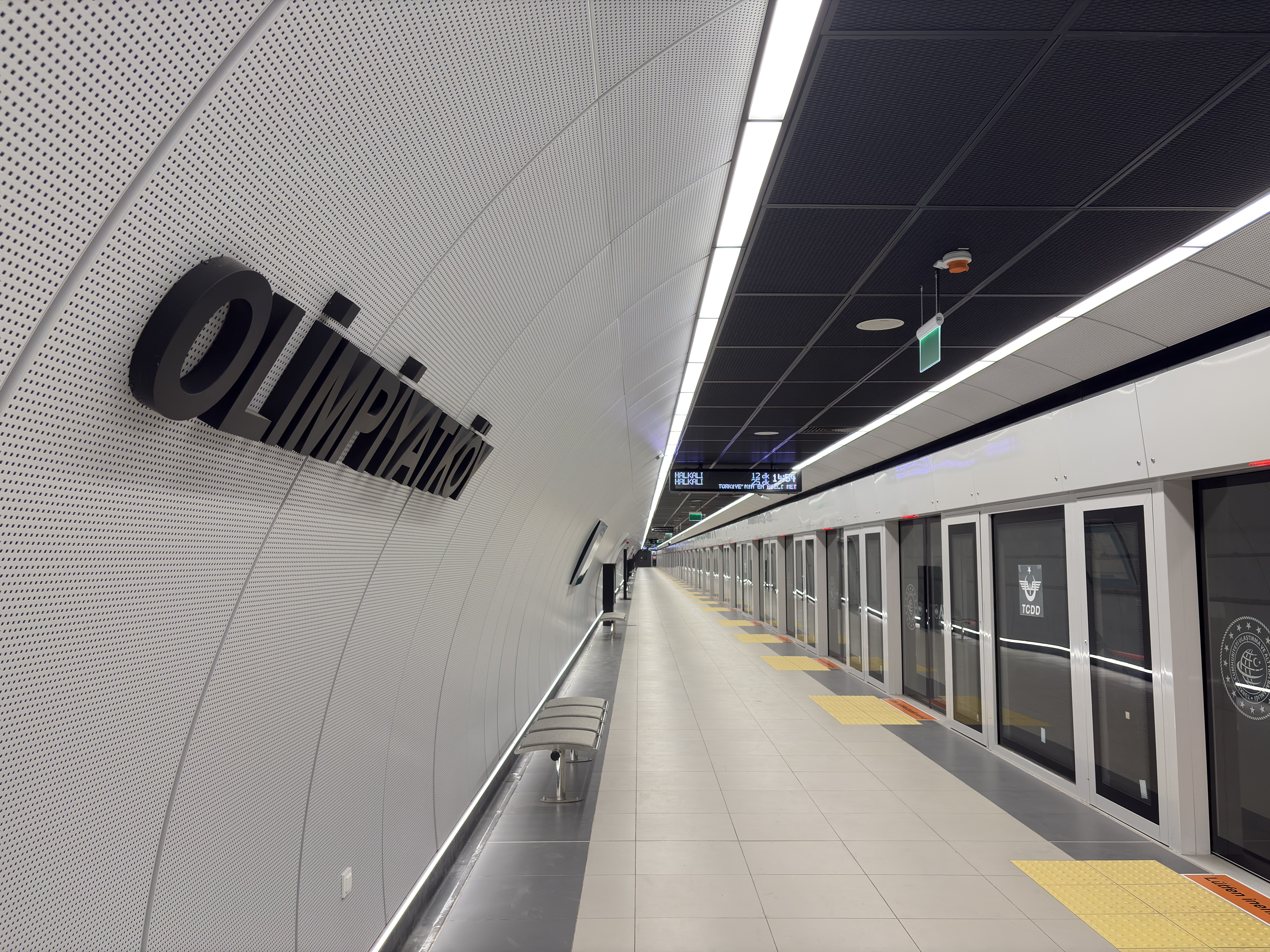
- Platform

General information
- Location: Ziya Gökalp Neighborhood, Atatürk Olympic Stadium, 34490; Başakşehir, Istanbul; Turkey
- Coordinates: 41°4′43″N 28°46′10″E
- System: Istanbul Metro rapid transit station
- Owner: Ministry of Transport and Infrastructure
- Operator: TCDD Transport
- Line: M11
- Platforms: 1 Island platform
- Tracks: 2
- Connections: M9 (Olimpiyat); İETT Bus: Stat Yolu: 36AS, 79FY, 79K, HS1; Olimpiyatköy: 36F, MK2, MK11, MK12, MK13, MK14, MK15, MK16

Construction
- Structure type: Underground
- Parking: No
- Cycle facilities: Yes
- Accessible: Yes

History
- Opened: 20 June 2026 (2 months ago)
- Electrified: 1,500 V DC Overhead line

Services
Preceding station	Istanbul Metro	Following station
Halkalı Stadı towards Halkalı	M11 Line	Kayaşehir towards Gayrettepe
Transfer at Olimpiyat
Terminus	M9 Line	Ziya Gökalp Mahallesi towards Ataköy
Location

Olimpiyatköy is an underground station on the M11 line of the Istanbul Metro. It is located under an opening at the northeast of the Atatürk Olympic Stadium complex in the Ziya Gökalp neighborhood of Başakşehir. It was opened on 20 June 2026. The station is an interchange station with the M9 line at Olimpiyat, which uses a different station name but provides an out-of-station transfer with the M11 line.

== Layout ==
Southbound	← toward Halkalı (Halkalı Stadı)
Island platform, doors will open on the left
Northbound	toward Gayrettepe - Istanbul Airport (Kayaşehir) →

== Operation information ==
The line operates between 06:00 and 00:40 and train frequency is 20 minutes. The line has no night service.

== Nearby places of interest ==
- Atatürk Olympic Stadium – the largest stadium in Turkey

== Gallery ==
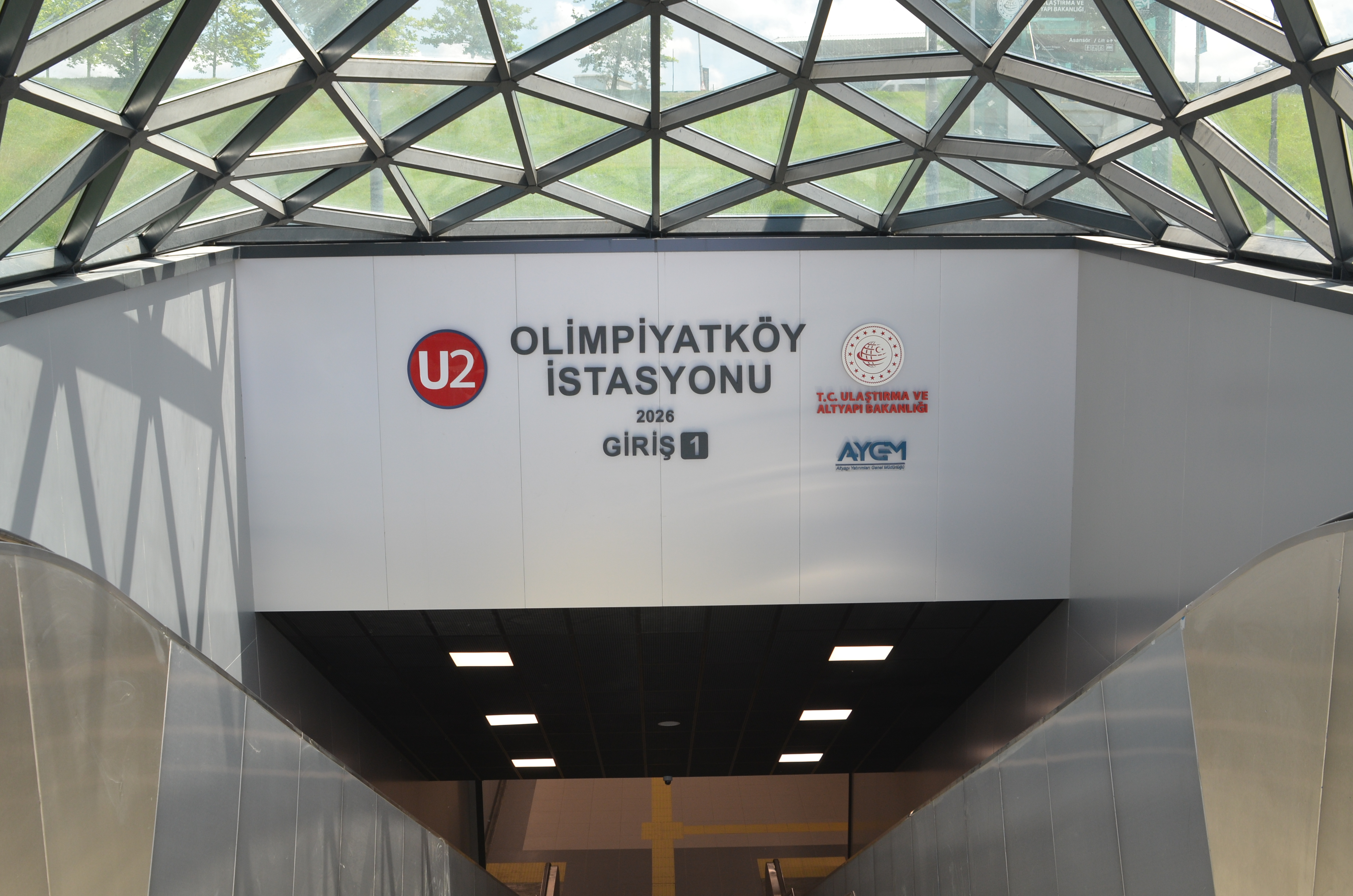
Entrance 1

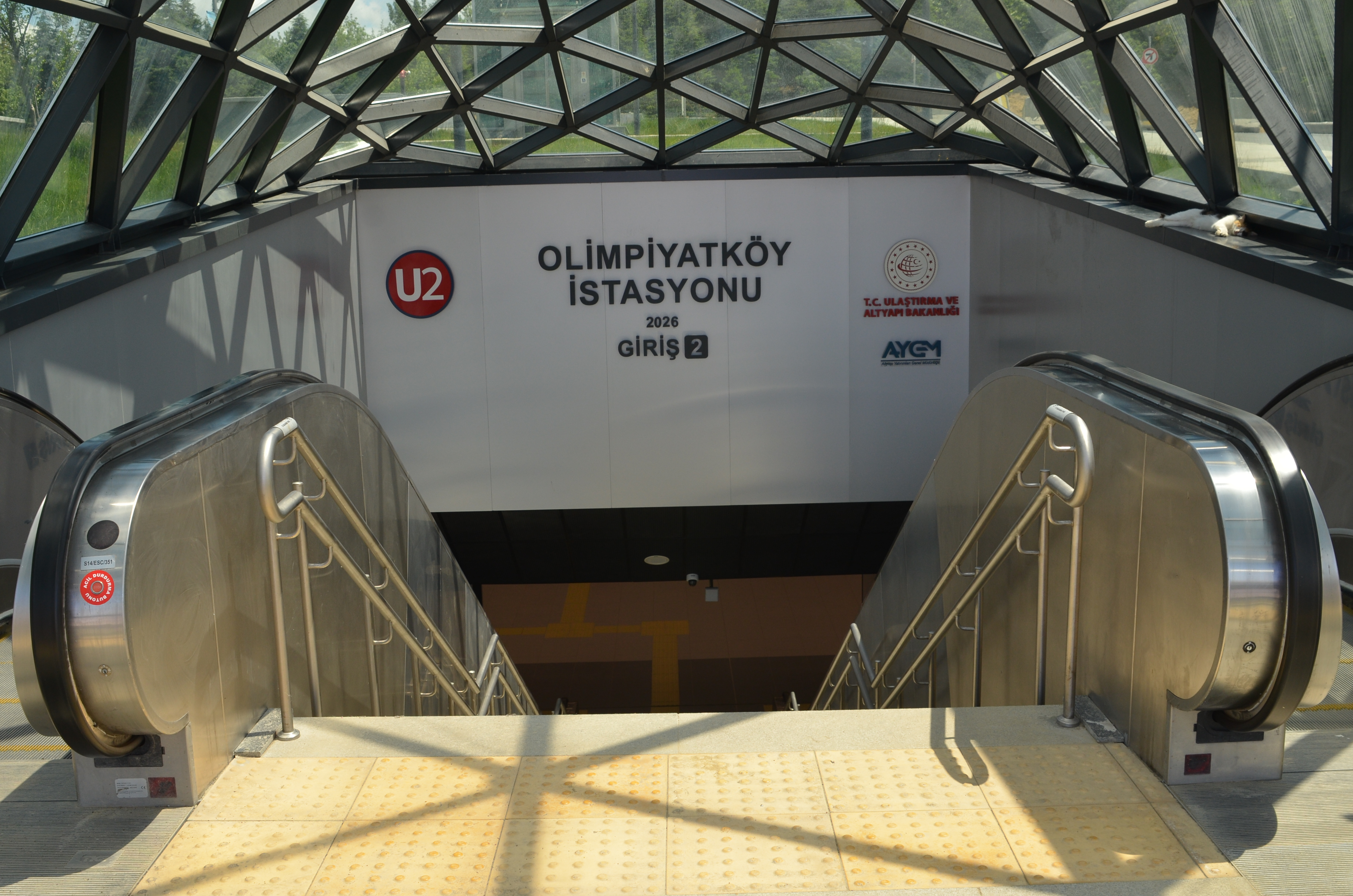
Entrance 2

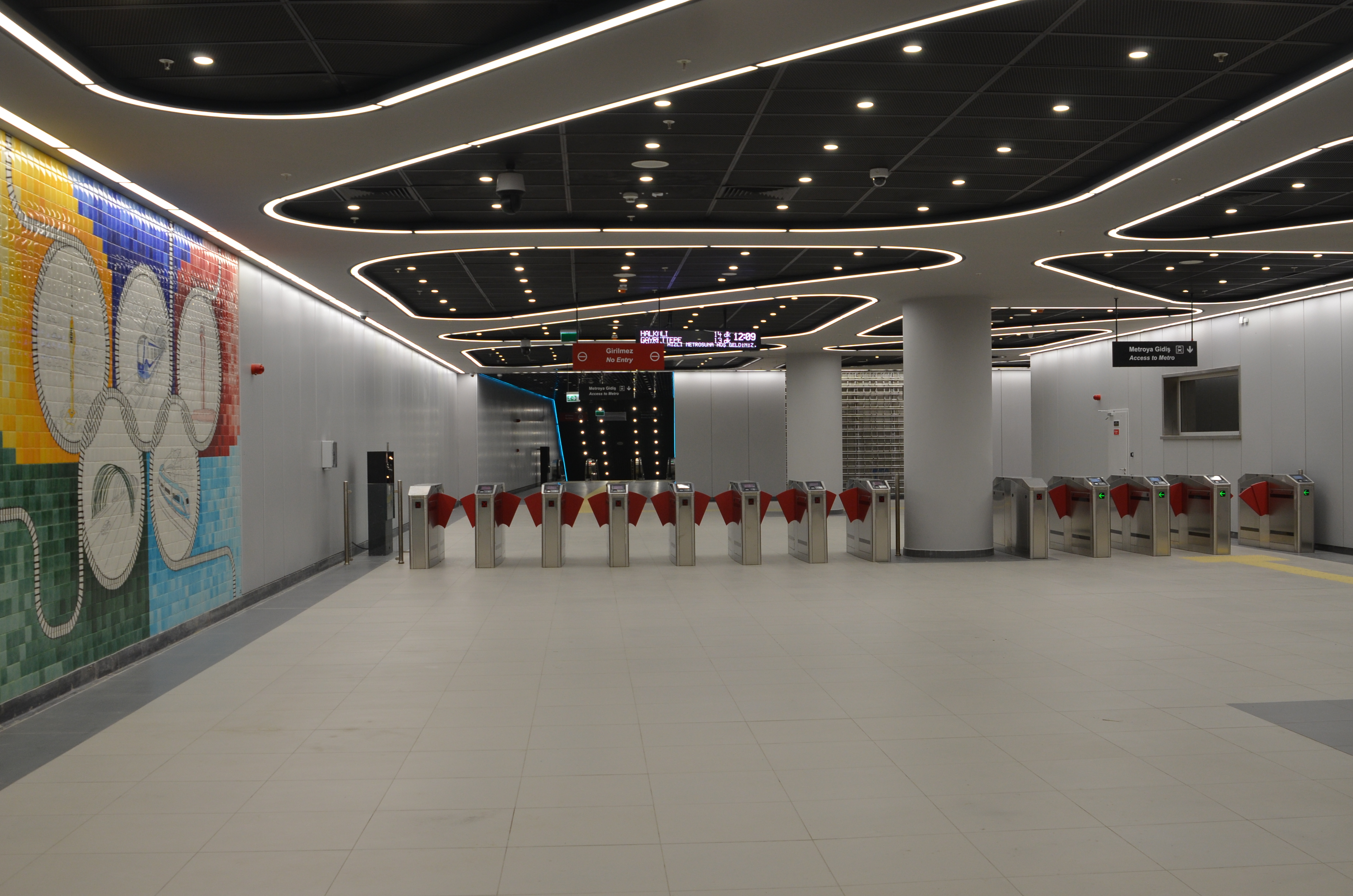
Ticket hall

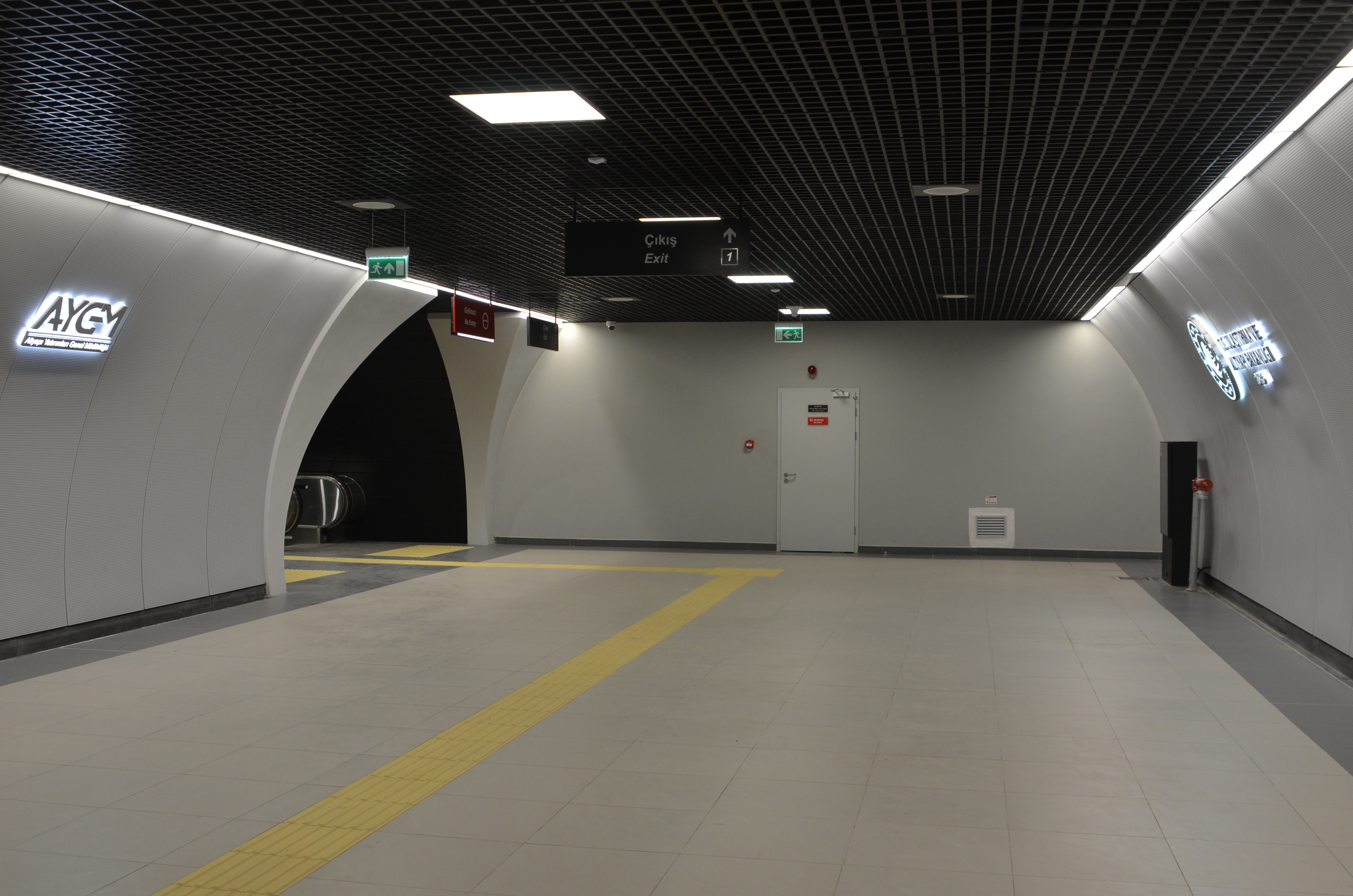
Mezzanine

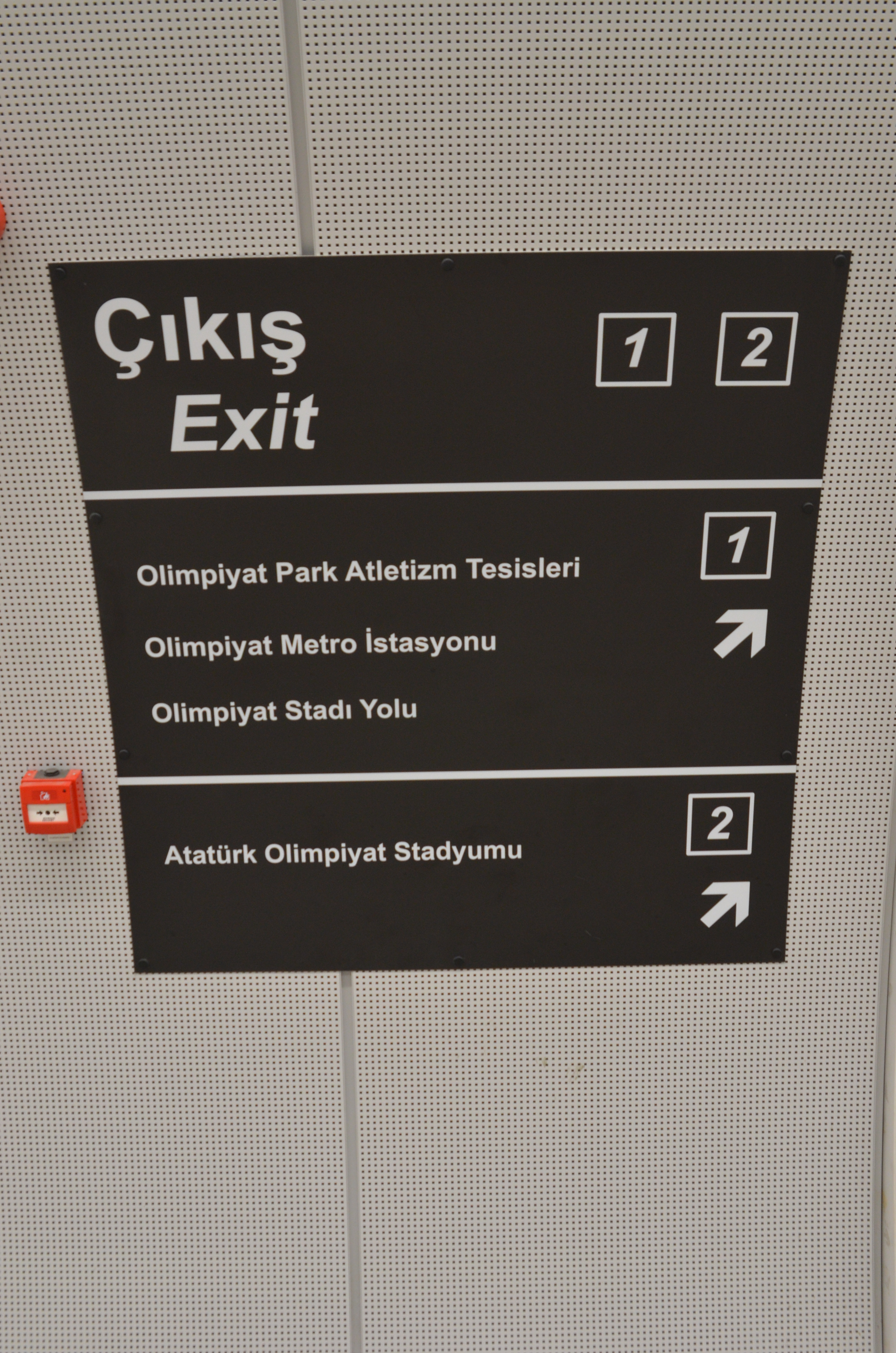
Exit sign

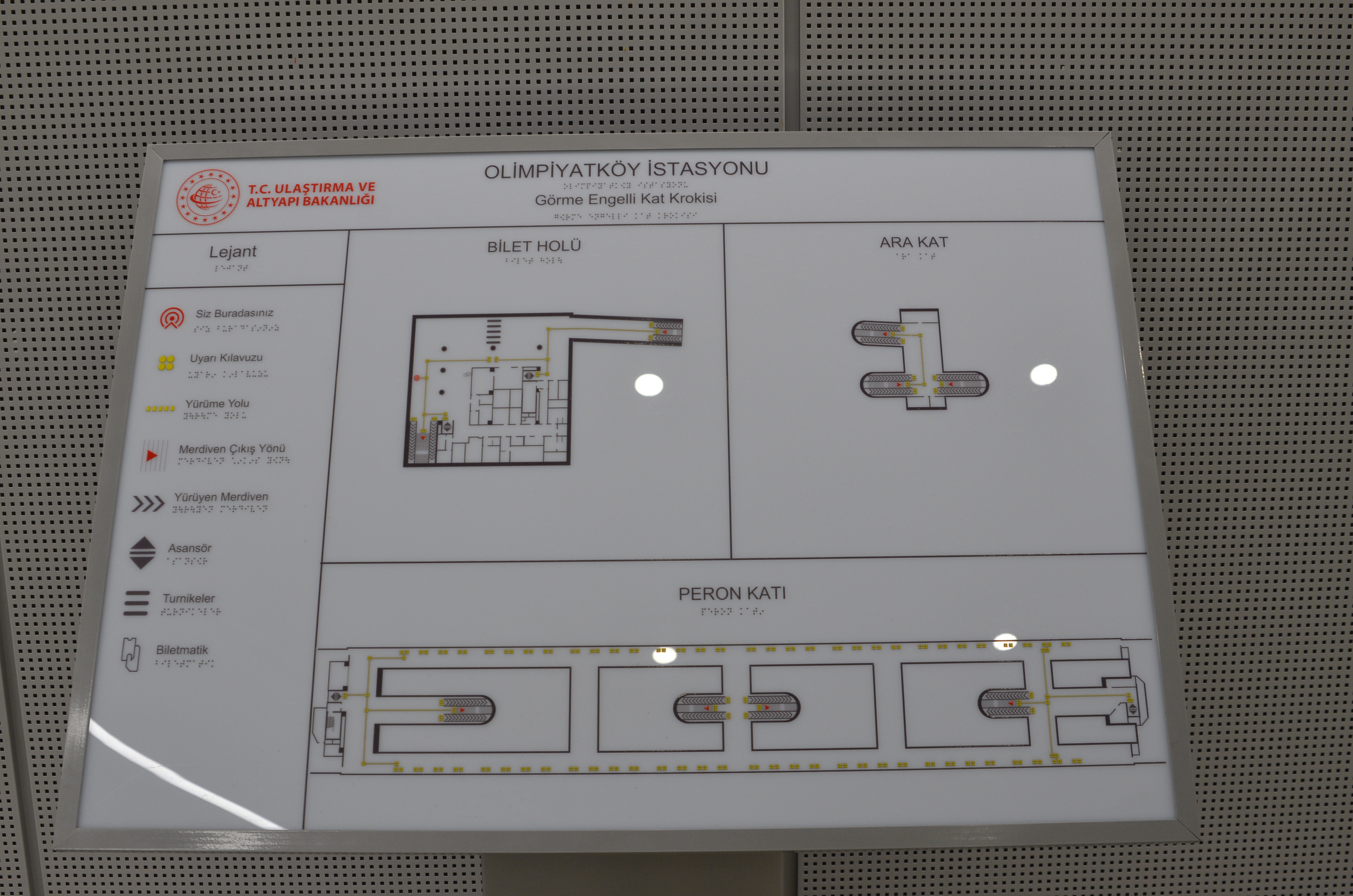
Station diagram (Entrance 1)

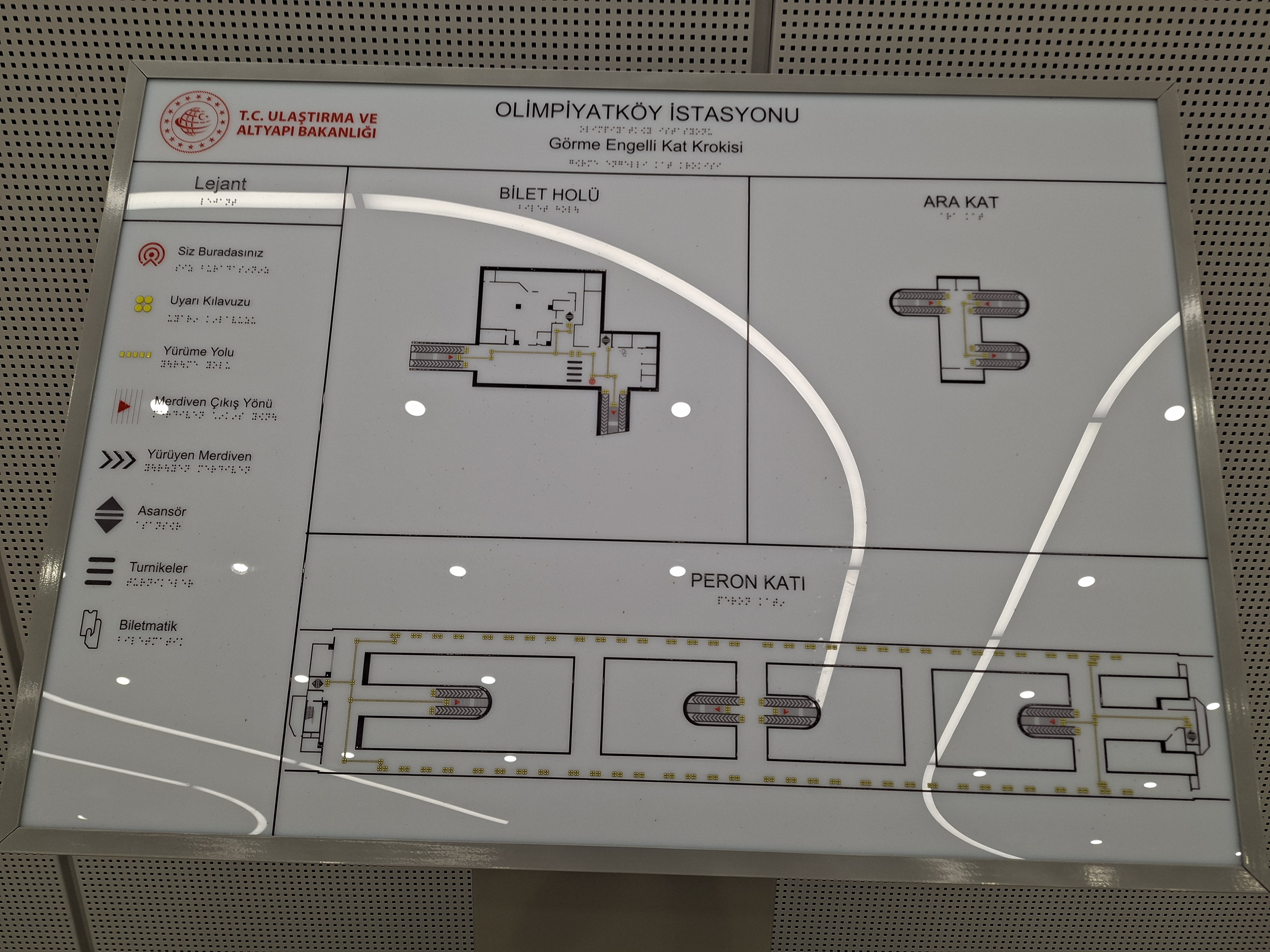
Station diagram (Entrance 2)

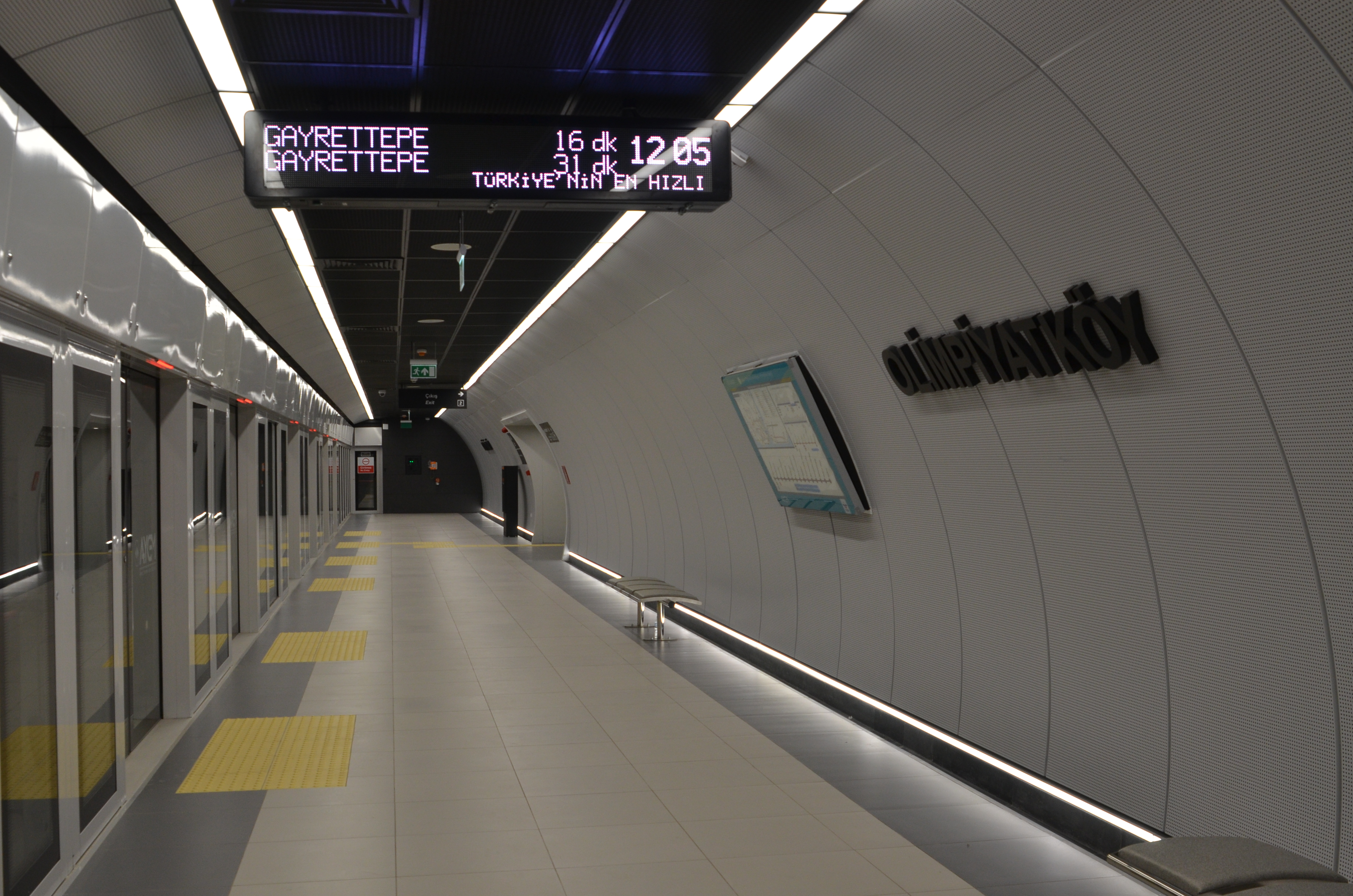
Platform (towards Gayrettepe)
