= Halkalı Stadı station =

Station of the Istanbul Metro

Halkalı Stadı
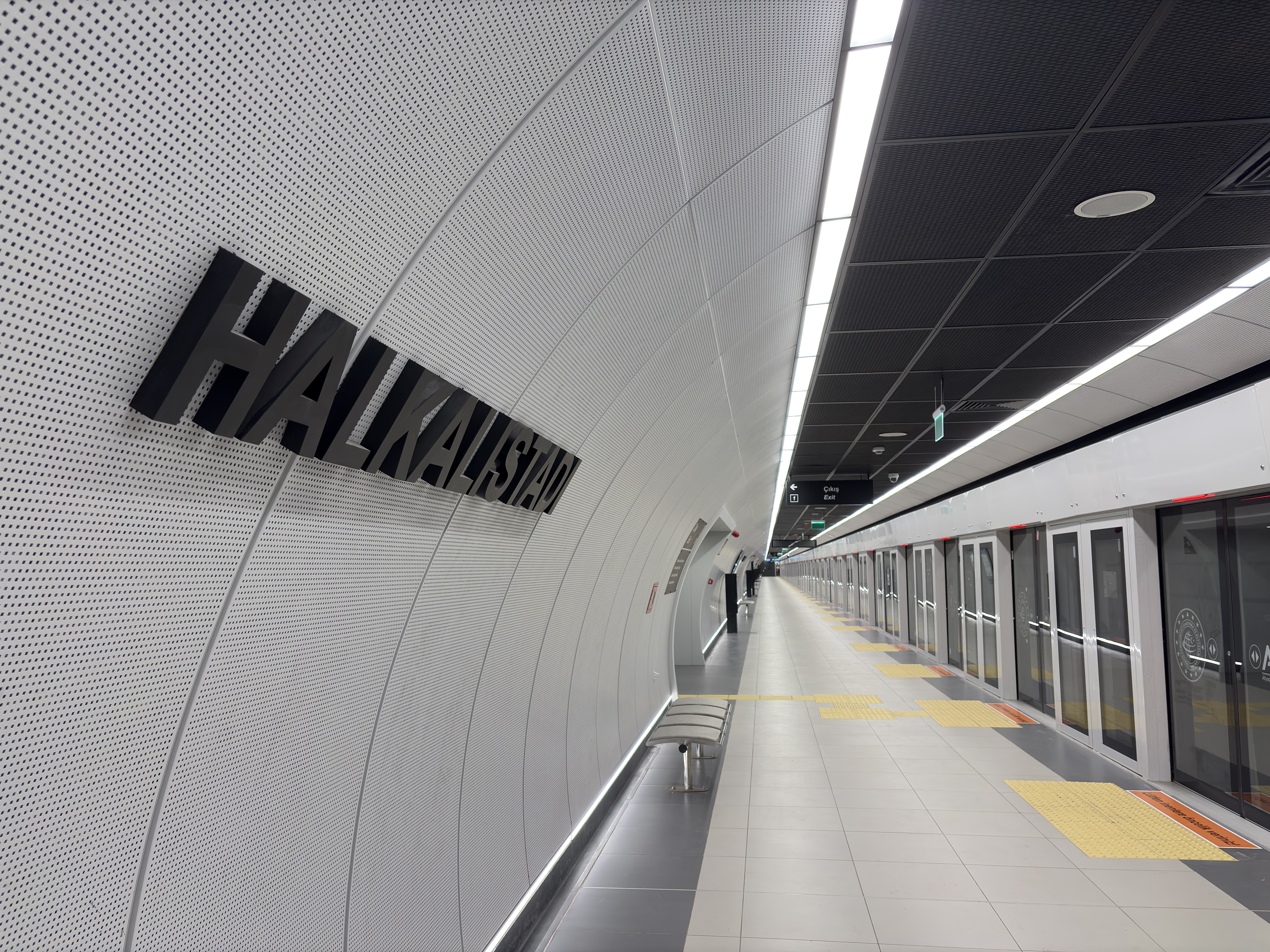
- Platform

General information
- Location: Atakent Neighborhood, 4th Street, 34307; Küçükçekmece, Istanbul; Turkey
- Coordinates: 41°3′23″N 28°46′28″E
- System: Istanbul Metro rapid transit station
- Owner: Ministry of Transport and Infrastructure
- Operator: TCDD Transport
- Line: M11
- Platforms: 1 Island platform
- Tracks: 2
- Connections: İETT Bus: 78G, 78Ş, 89, 89T, 89YB, 98AB, 98T, 141A, 141K, MR40, MR52; Istanbul Minibus: Tahtakale - Yüzyıl

Construction
- Structure type: Underground
- Parking: No
- Cycle facilities: Yes
- Accessible: Yes

History
- Opened: 20 June 2026 (2 months ago)
- Electrified: 1,500 V DC Overhead line

Services
Preceding station	Istanbul Metro	Following station
Halkalı Terminus	M11 Line	Olimpiyatköy towards Gayrettepe
Location

Halkalı Stadı (Halkalı Stadium) is an underground station on the M11 line of the Istanbul Metro. It is located under 4th Street in the Atakent neighborhood of Küçükçekmece. It was opened on 20 June 2026.

The station will become an interchange station with the M7 line at Atakent Mahallesi in 2028.

== Layout ==
Southbound	← toward Halkalı (terminus)
Island platform, doors will open on the left
Northbound	toward Gayrettepe - Istanbul Airport (Olimpiyatköy) →

== Operation information ==
The line operates between 06:00 and 00:40 and train frequency is 20 minutes. The line has no night service.

== Nearby places of interest ==
- Halkalı Stadium
- Istanbul Tema Hospital
- Tema World AVM

== Gallery ==
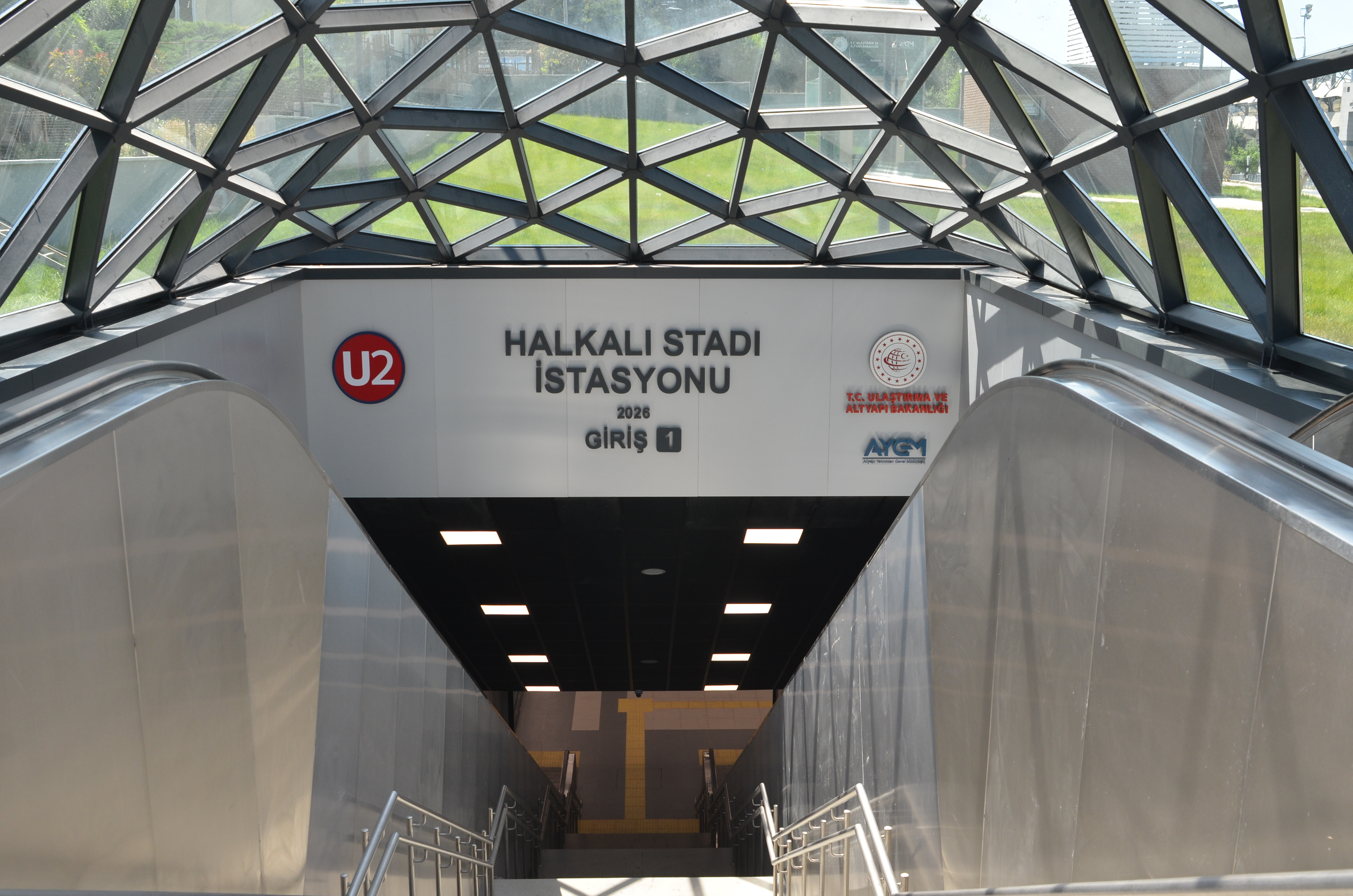
Entrance 1

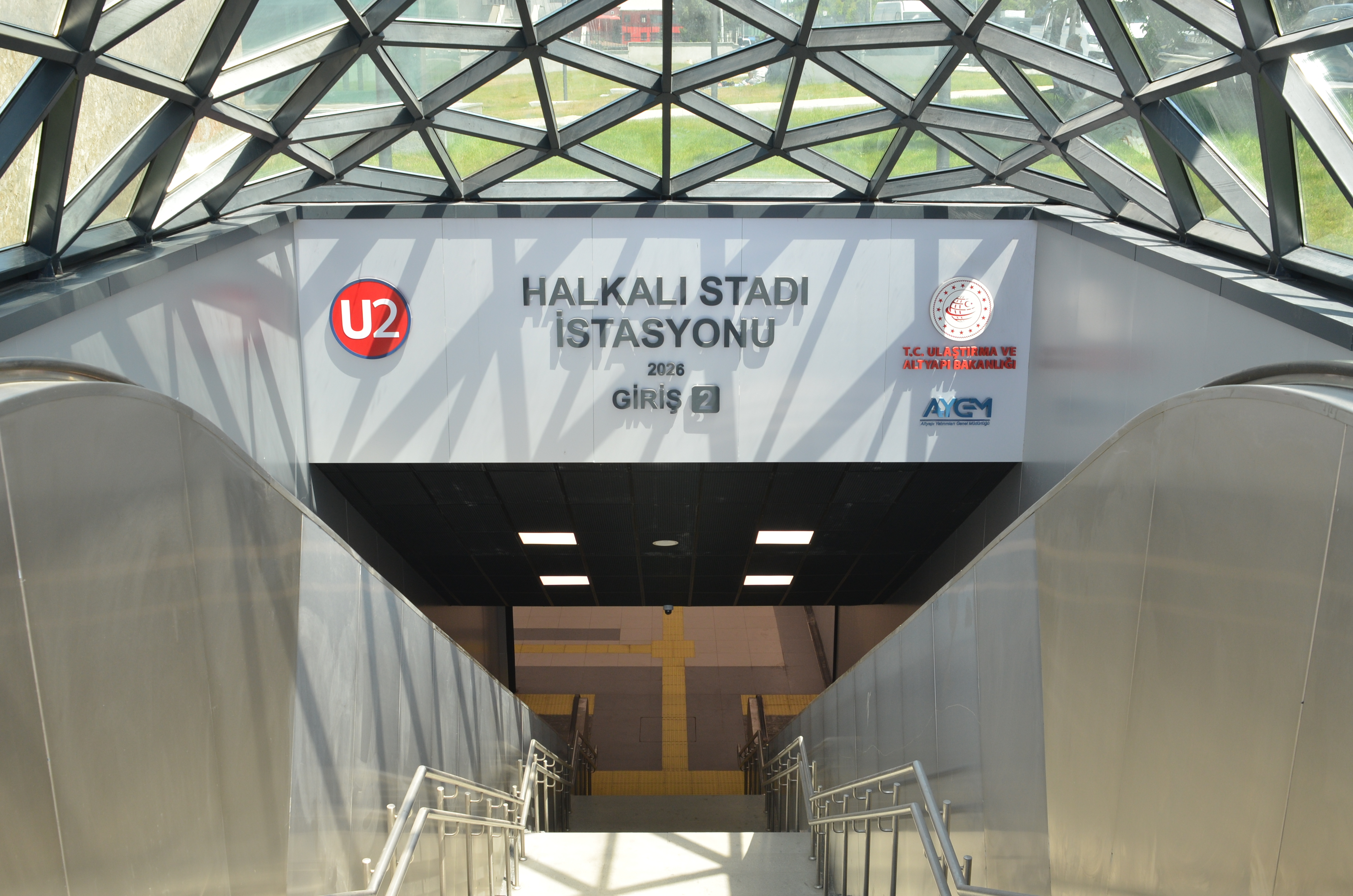
Entrance 2

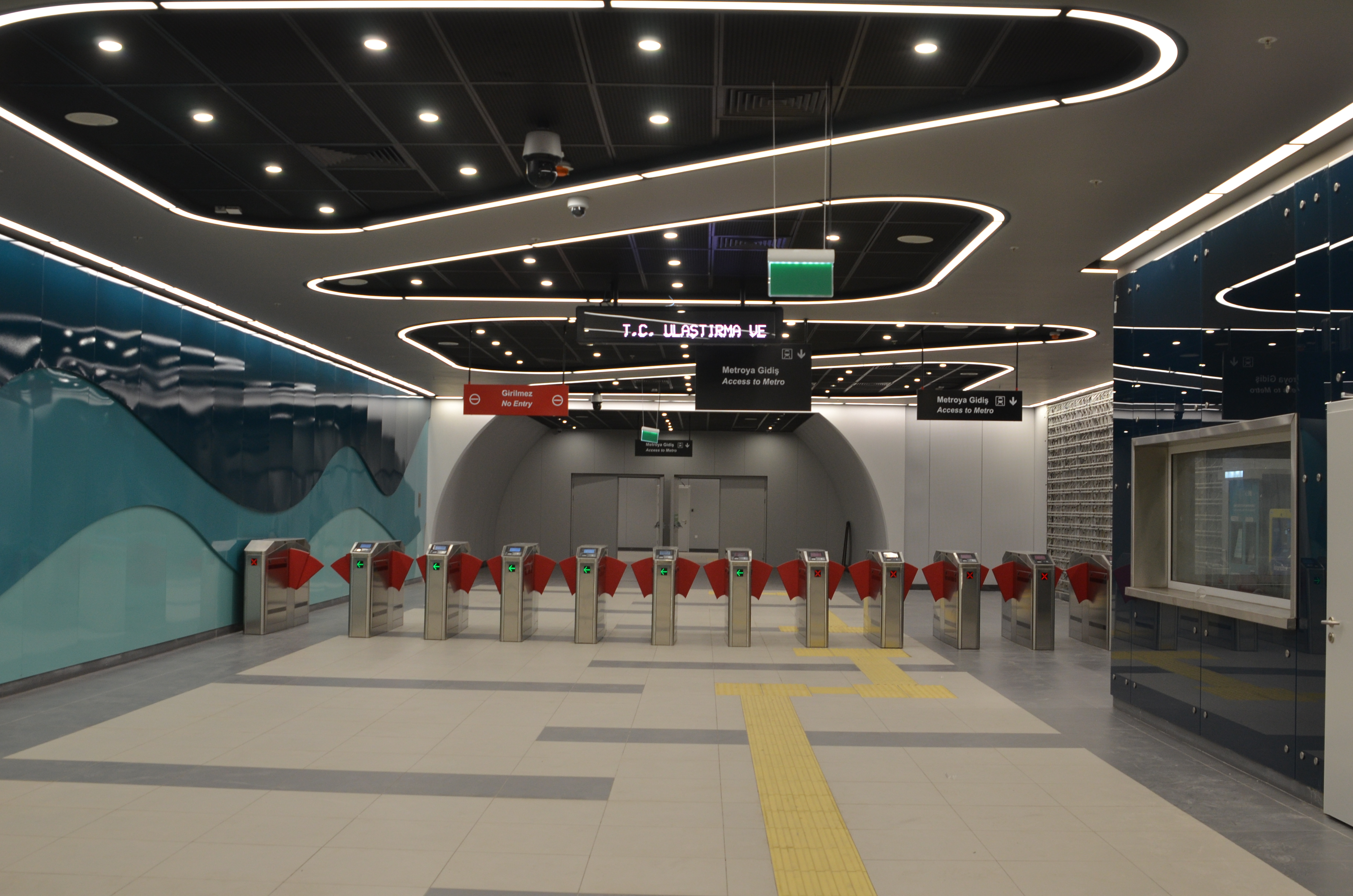
Ticket hall

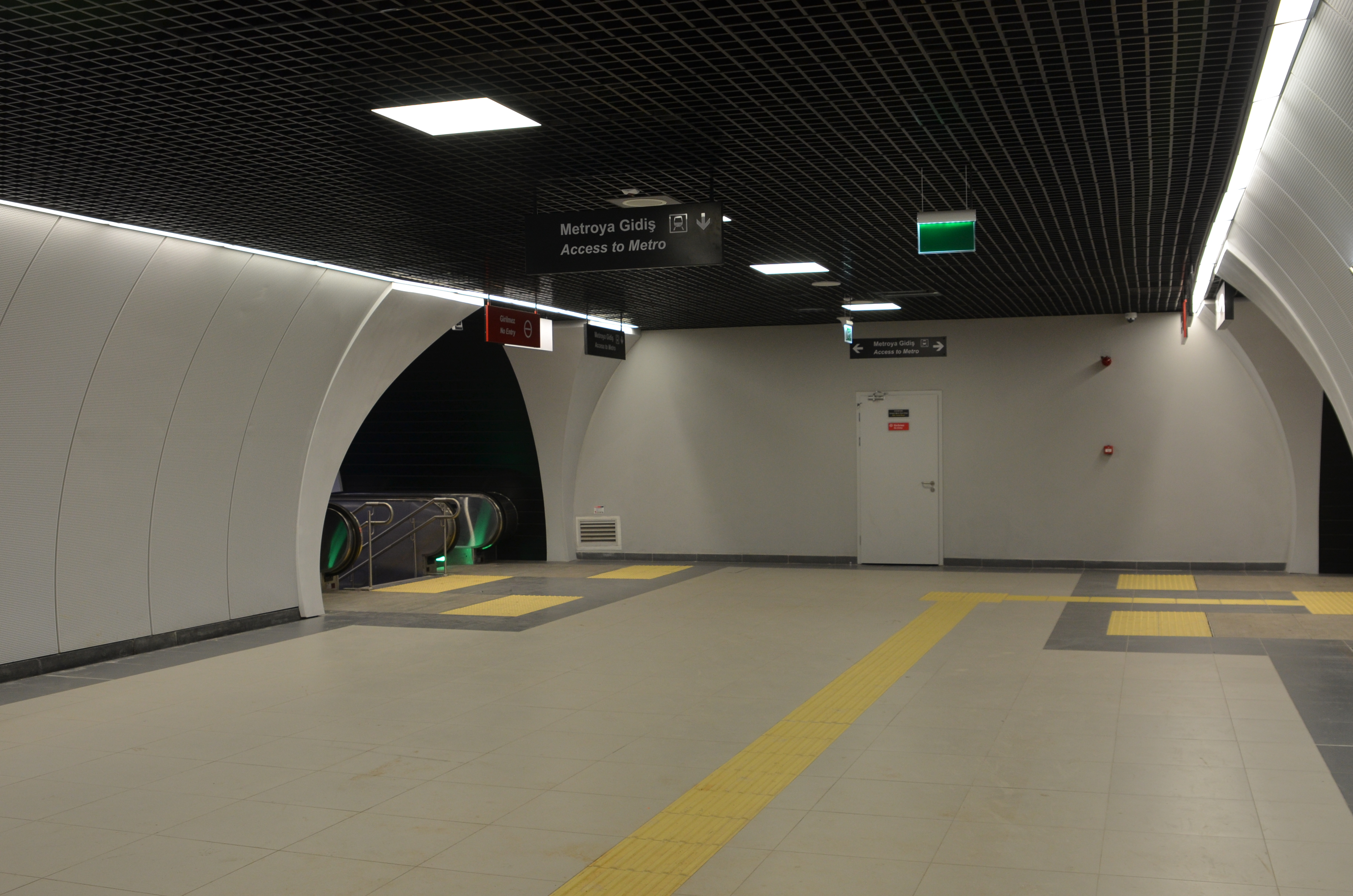
Mezzanine

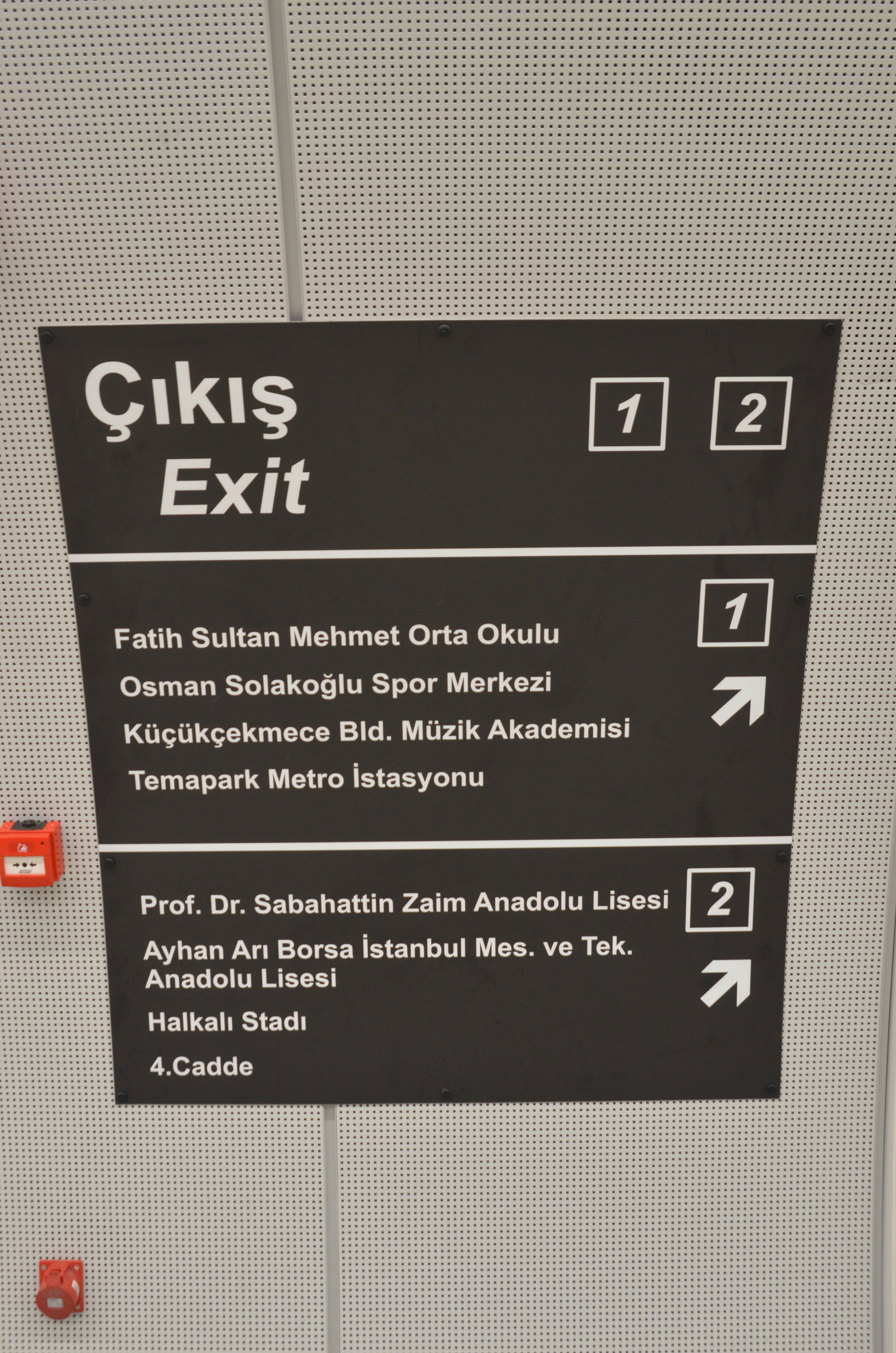
Exit sign

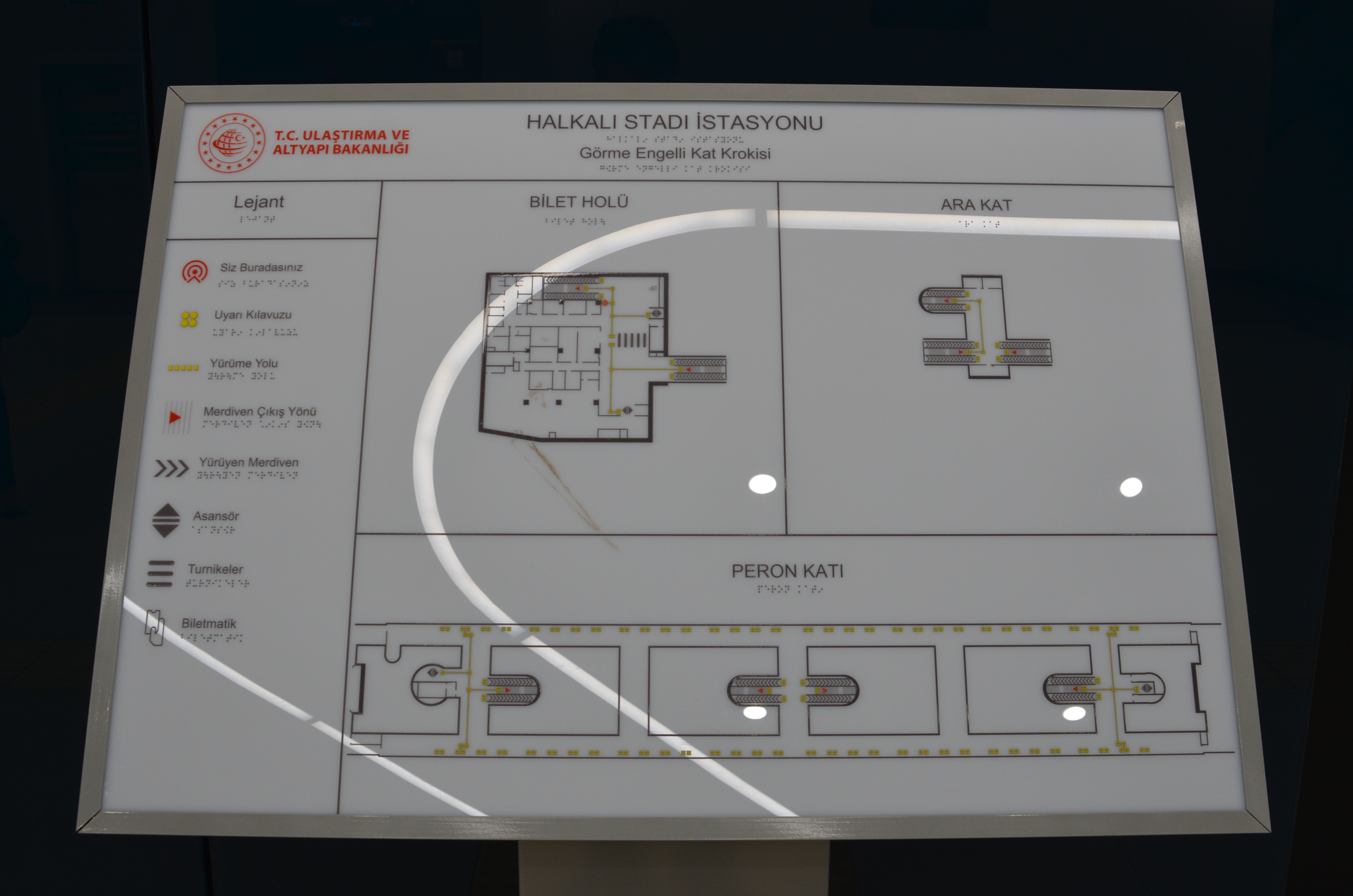
Station diagram (Entrance 1)

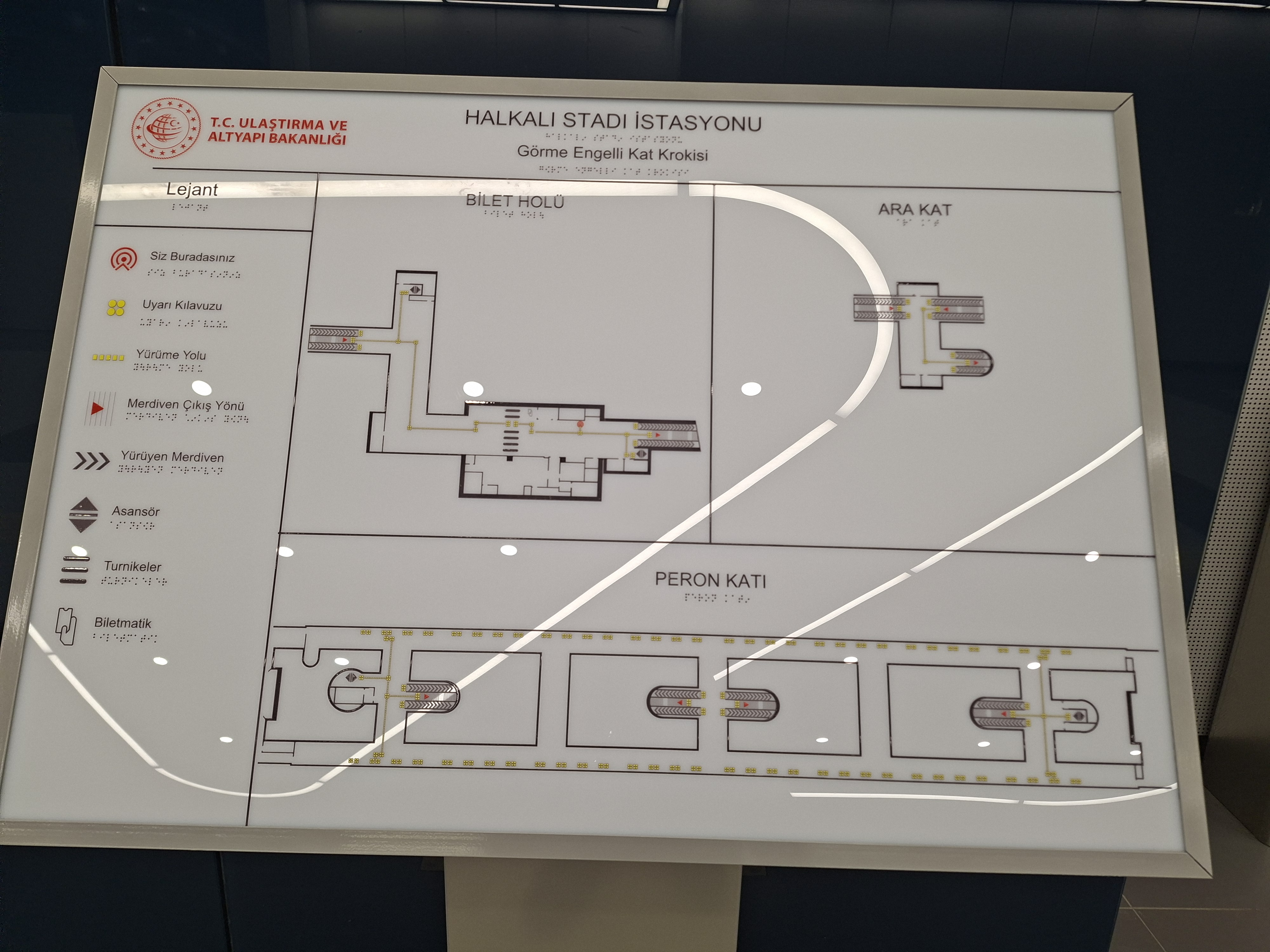
Station diagram (Entrance 2)

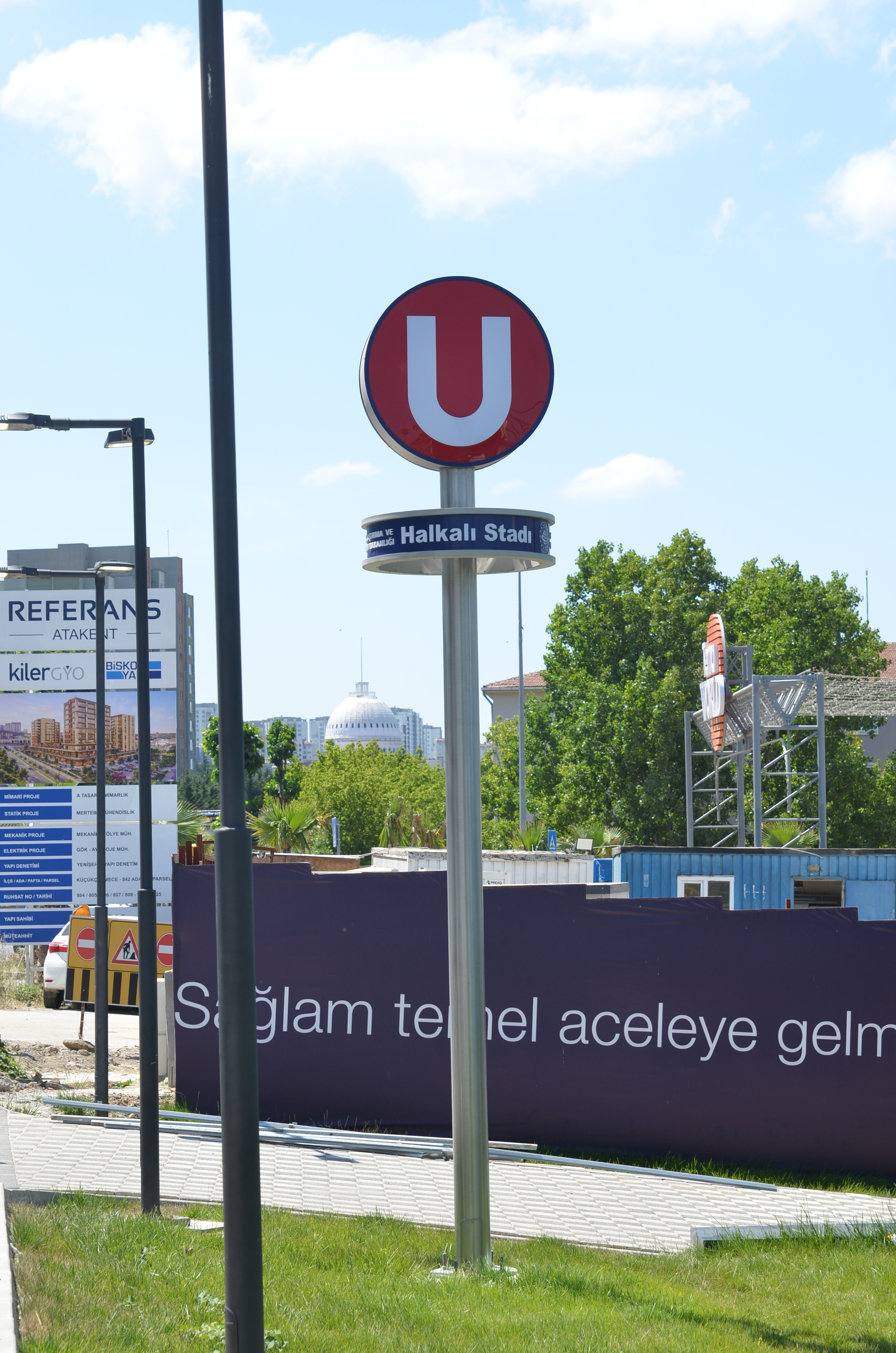
Totem pole

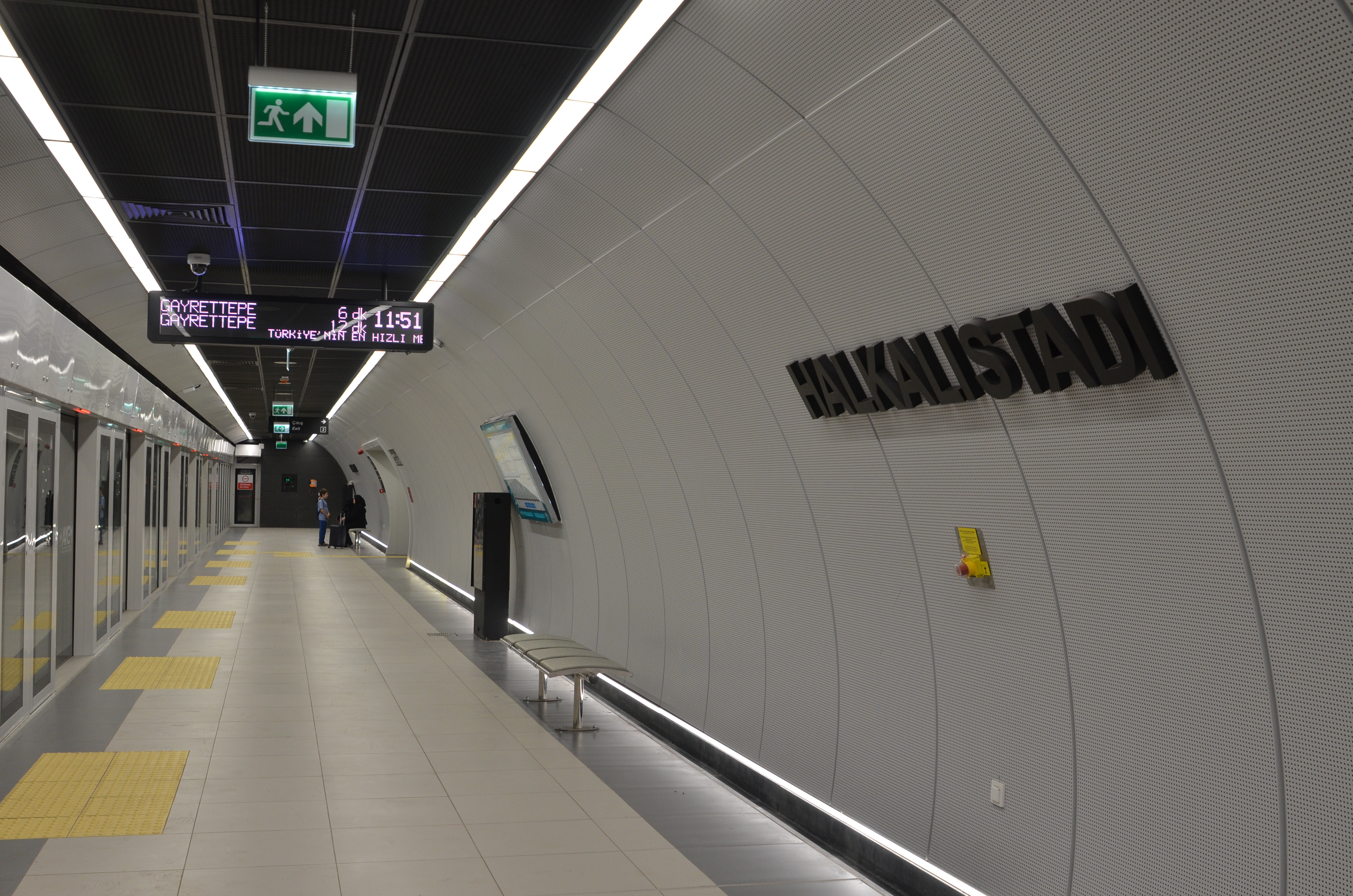
Platform (towards Gayrettepe)
