= List of populated places in Istanbul Province =

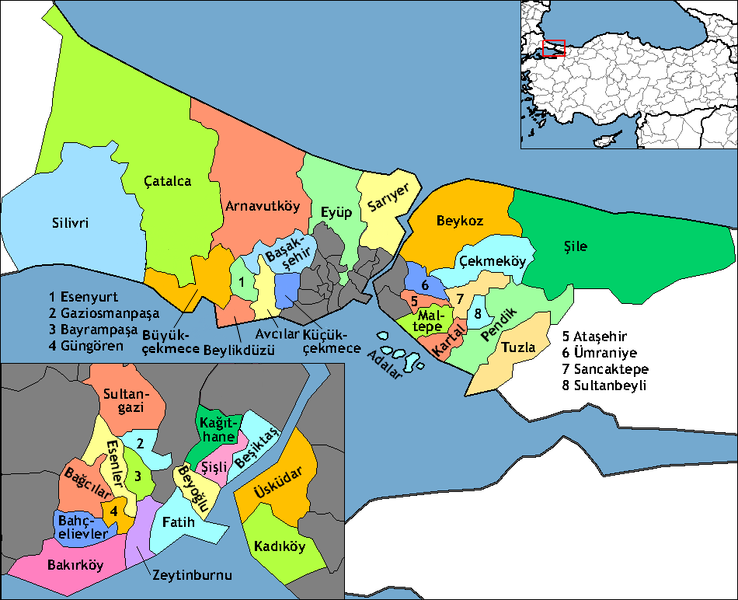
İstanbul Province

Below is the list of populated places in Istanbul Province, Turkey by the districts. All districts of Istanbul Province are considered as a part of Greater Istanbul and most districts have no populated places other than the district center itself. In the following lists first place in each list is the administrative center of the district.

According to Law act no 6360, all Turkish provinces with a population more than 750 000 were renamed as metropolitan municipality. All districts in those provinces became second level municipalities and all villages in those districts were renamed as a neighborhoods Thus the villages below are officially neighborhoods of İstanbul.

== Adalar ==
- Adalar

== Arnavutköy ==
- Arnavutköy
- Baklalı, Arnavutköy
- Balaban, Arnavutköy
- Boyalık, Arnavutköy
- Hacımaşlı, Arnavutköy
- Karaburun, Arnavutköy
- Tayakadın, Arnavutköy
- Yassıören, Arnavutköy
- Yeniköy, Arnavutköy

== Ataşehir ==
- Ataşehir

== Avcılar ==
- Avcılar

== Bağcılar ==
- Bağcılar

== Bahçelievler ==
- Bahçelievler

== Bakırköy ==
- Bakırköy

== Başakşehir ==
- Başakşehir
- Şamlar

== Bayrampaşa ==
- Bayrampaşa

== Beşiktaş ==
- Beşiktaş

== Beykoz ==
- Beykoz
- Akbaba, Beykoz
- Alibahadır, Beykoz
- Anadolufeneri, Beykoz
- Bozhane, Beykoz
- Cumhuriyet, Beykoz
- Dereseki, Beykoz
- Elmalı, Beykoz
- Göllü, Beykoz
- Görele, Beykoz
- İshaklı, Beykoz
- Kaynarca, Beykoz
- Kılıçlı, Beykoz
- Mahmutşevketpaşa, Beykoz
- Örnekköy, Beykoz
- Öyümce, Beykoz
- Paşamandıra, Beykoz
- Polonez, Beykoz
- Poyraz, Beykoz
- Riva, Beykoz
- Zerzavatçı, Beykoz

== Beylikdüzü ==
- Beylikdüzü

== Beyoğlu ==
- Beyoğlu

== Büyükçekmece ==
- Büyükçekmece

== Çatalca ==
- Çatalca
- Akalan, Çatalca
- Aydınlar, Çatalca
- Başak, Çatalca
- Belgrat, Çatalca
- Celepköy, Çatalca
- Çanakça, Çatalca
- Dağyenice, Çatalca
- Elbasan, Çatalca
- Gökçeali, Çatalca
- Gümüşpınar, Çatalca
- Hallaçlı, Çatalca
- Hisarbeyli, Çatalca
- İhsaniye, Çatalca
- İnceğiz, Çatalca
- Kabakça, Çatalca
- Kalfa, Çatalca
- Karamandere, Çatalca
- Kestanelik, Çatalca
- Kızılcaali, Çatalca
- Oklalı, Çatalca
- Ormanlı, Çatalca
- Örcünlü, Çatalca
- Örencik, Çatalca
- Subaşı, Çatalca
- Yalıköy, Çatalca
- Yaylacık, Çatalca
- Yazlık, Çatalca

== Çekmeköy ==
- Çekmeköy
- Hüseyinli, Çekmeköy
- Koçullu, Çekmeköy
- Reşadiye, Çekmeköy
- Sırapınar, Çekmeköy

== Esenler ==
- Esenler

== Esenyurt ==
- Esenyurt

== Eyüp ==
- Eyüp
- Ağaçlı, Eyüp
- Akpınar, Eyüp
- Çiftalan, Eyüp
- Işıklar, Eyüp
- İhsaniye, Eyüp
- Odayeri, Eyüp
- Pirinççi, Eyüp

== Fatih ==
- Fatih

== Gaziosmanpaşa ==
- Gaziosmanpaşa

== Güngören ==
- Güngören

== Kadıköy ==
- Kadıköy

== Kağıthane ==
- Kağıthane

== Kartal ==
- Kartal

== Küçükçekmece ==
- Küçükçekmece

== Pendik ==
- Pendik
- Ballıca, Pendik
- Emirli, Pendik
- Göçbeyli, Pendik
- Kurna, Pendik
- Kurtdoğmuş, Pendik

== Maltepe ==
- Maltepe

== Sancaktepe ==
- Sancektepe
- Paşaköy, Sancaktepe

== Sarıyer ==
- Sarıyer
- Demirci, Sarıyer
- Garipçe, Sarıyer
- Gümüşdere, Sarıyer
- Kısırkaya, Sarıyer
- Kumköy, Sarıyer
- Rumelifeneri, Sarıyer
- Uskumruköy, Sarıyer
- Zekeriyaköy, Sarıyer

== Silivri ==
- Silivri
- Akören, Silivri
- Bekirli, Silivri
- Beyciler, Silivri
- Büyükkılıçlı, Silivri
- Çanta, Silivri
- Çayırdere, Silivri
- Çeltik, Silivri
- Danamandıra, Silivri
- Fenerköy, Silivri
- Kurfallı, Silivri
- Küçüksinekli, Silivri
- Sayalar, Silivri
- Seymen, Silivri
- Sinekli, Silivri

== Sultanbeyli ==
- Sultanbeyli

== Sultangazi ==
- Sultangazi

== Şile ==
- Şile
- Ağaçdere, Şile
- Ahmetli, Şile
- Akçakese, Şile
- Alacalı, Şile
- Avcıkoru, Şile
- Bıçkıdere, Şile
- Bozkoca, Şile
- Bucaklı, Şile
- Çataklı, Şile
- Çayırbaşı, Şile
- Çelebi, Şile
- Çengilli, Şile
- Darlık, Şile
- Değirmençayırı, Şile
- Doğancılı, Şile
- Erenler, Şile
- Esenceli, Şile
- Geredeli, Şile
- Göçe, Şile
- Gökmaslı, Şile
- Göksu, Şile
- Hacıllı, Şile
- Hasanlı, Şile
- İmrendere, Şile
- İmrenli, Şile
- İsaköy, Şile
- Kabakoz, Şile
- Kadıköy, Şile
- Kalem, Şile
- Karabeyli, Şile
- Karacaköy, Şile
- Karakiraz, Şile
- Karamandere, Şile
- Kervansaray, Şile
- Kızılca, Şile
- Korucu, Şile
- Kömürlük, Şile
- Kurfallı, Şile
- Kurna, Şile
- Meşrutiyet, Şile
- Oruçoğlu, Şile
- Osmanköy, Şile
- Ovacık, Şile
- Sahilköy, Şile
- Satmazlı, Şile
- Sofular, Şile
- Soğullu, Şile
- Sortullu, Şile
- Şuayipli, Şile
- Tekeköy, Şile
- Ulupelit, Şile
- Üvezli, Şile
- Yaka, Şile
- Yaylalı, Şile
- Yazımanayır, Şile
- Yeniköy, Şile
- Yeşilvadi, Şile

== Şişli ==
- Şişli

== Tuzla ==
- Tuzla

== Ümraniye ==
- Ümraniye

== Üsküdar ==
- Üsküdar

== Zeytinburnu ==
- Zeytinburnu
