= Ballıgerme =

Coordinates: 41°20′53.25″N 28°17′21.6″E

Ballıgerme was part of a Roman aqueduct that provided water for the people of Constantinople. It was destroyed by treasure hunters in 2020.

== History ==
The aqueduct was located in Çatalca district in Istanbul province, in the Istranca mountains. Ballıgerme was one of the tallest bridges of the aqueduct. According to Interesting Engineering, "broad vaulted masonry channels, 90 large, stone and concrete bridges, and tunnels up to 3 miles (5km) were all part of the design."

After Constantinople was made the capital of the Roman Empire in 324 AD, the aqueduct was built in 373 by Emperor Valens to supply the city from water springs about 60 kilometers to the West. "As the city grew, this system was expanded in the 5th century to springs that lie even 120 kilometers from the city in a straight line. This gave the aqueduct a total length of at least 426 kilometers, making it the longest of the ancient world."

Scientists at Johannes Gutenberg University Mainz (JGU) who were investigating the design of the aqueduct "found that the entire aqueduct system only contained thin carbonate deposits, representing about 27 years of use", indicating that the aqueduct must have been cleaned. The researchers discovered that "50 kilometers of the central part of the water system is constructed double, with one aqueduct channel above the other, crossing on two-story bridges. ... It is very likely that this system was set up to allow for cleaning and maintenance operations"

In 2020, the bridge was blown up with dynamite by "treasure hunters who erroneously believed they could find gold in the ruins."

Çatalca Culture and Tourism Association President Ahmet Rasim Yücel told Sözcü newspaper that "according to the rumors that are spoken among the people and which are not original, the people who made these works put gold between the stones and asked the people to use them in times of poverty. This unfounded gossip is dragging people here. They are tearing up these historical artefacts with fake treasure maps in their hands."

== See also ==
- Aqueduct of Valens
