= Aqueduct of Valens =

Roman aqueduct system located in the Republic of Turkey

Aqueduct of Valens Bozdoğan Kemeri
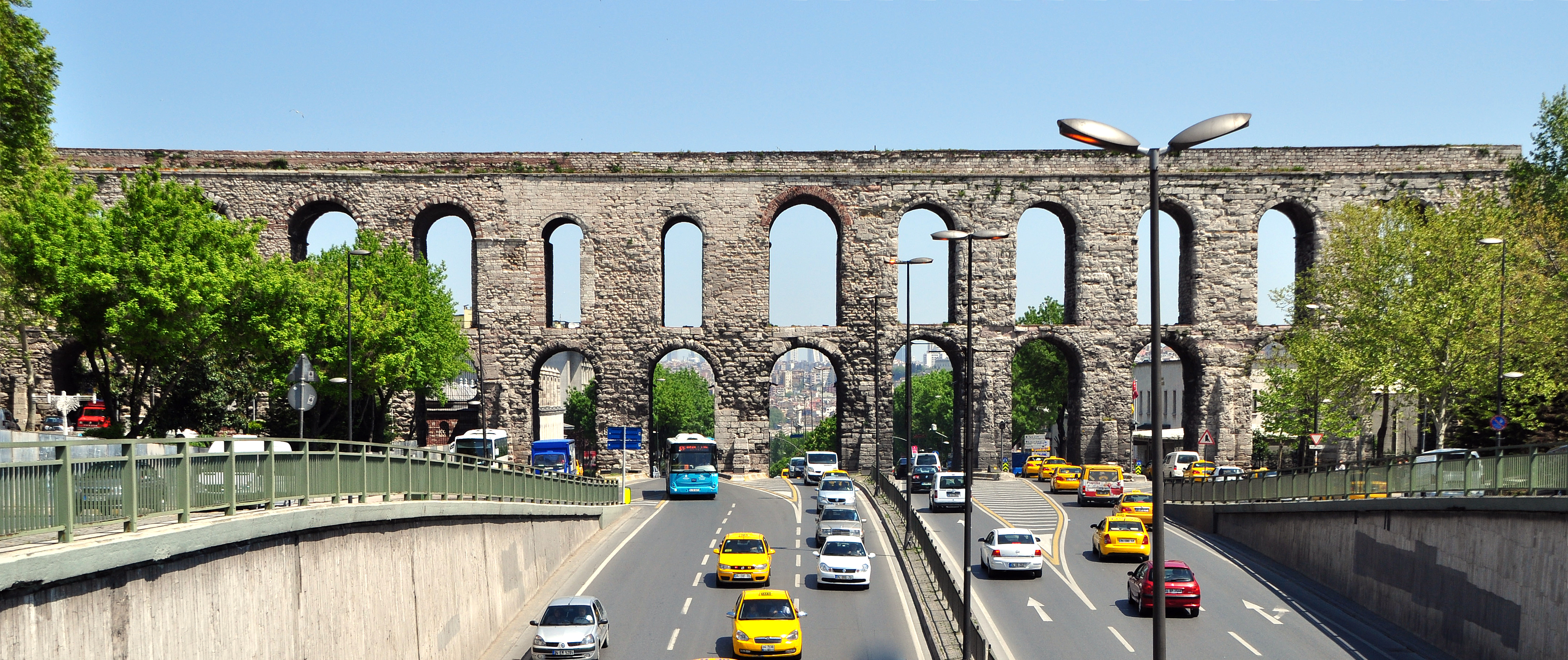
- Aqueduct of Valens
- Coordinates: 41°00′57.4″N 28°57′20″E
- Carries: Aqueduct of Valens to Constantinople
- Crosses: Atatürk Boulevard
- Locale: Istanbul, Turkey

Characteristics
- Design: Aqueduct bridge
- Material: Stone, brick
- Total length: Originally 971 m (3,186 ft)
- Width: 7.75–8.24 m (25.4–27.0 ft)
- Height: Ca. 29 m (95 ft)
- Longest span: Ca. 4 m (13 ft)

History
- Construction end: 368 AD

Location
- Interactive map of Aqueduct of Valens

The Aqueduct of Valens (Turkish: Valens Su Kemeri, Latin: Aquaeductus Valentis, Ancient Greek: Ἀγωγὸς τοῦ ὕδατος, romanized: Agōgós tou hýdatos, lit. 'aqueduct') was a Roman aqueduct system built in the late 4th century AD, to supply Constantinople – the capital of the Eastern Roman Empire. Construction of the aqueduct began during the reign of the Roman emperor Constantius II (r. 337–361) and was completed in 373 by the Emperor Valens (r. 364–378). The aqueduct remained in use for many centuries. It was extended and maintained by the Byzantines and the Ottomans.

Initially, the Aqueduct of Valens carried water from springs at Danımandere and Pınarca; the channels from each spring met at Dağyenice. This 4th-century first phase of the system was 268 kilometres (167 miles) long. A second, 5th-century phase added a further 451 kilometres (280 miles) of conduits that took water from Vize, 120 kilometres (75 miles) away from Constantinople.

The final and most visible aqueduct bridge in the system survives in the Fatih district of Istanbul, Turkey. Named in Turkish: Bozdoğan Kemeri, lit. 'Aqueduct of Bozdoğan', it is an important landmark in the city, with its arches passing over Atatürk Boulevard (Atatürk Bulvarı). The Bozdoğan Kemeri spans the valley between the hills that are today occupied by the Istanbul University and the Fatih Mosque, formerly the site of the Church of the Holy Apostles. The surviving section is 921 metres long, about 50 metres less than the original length.

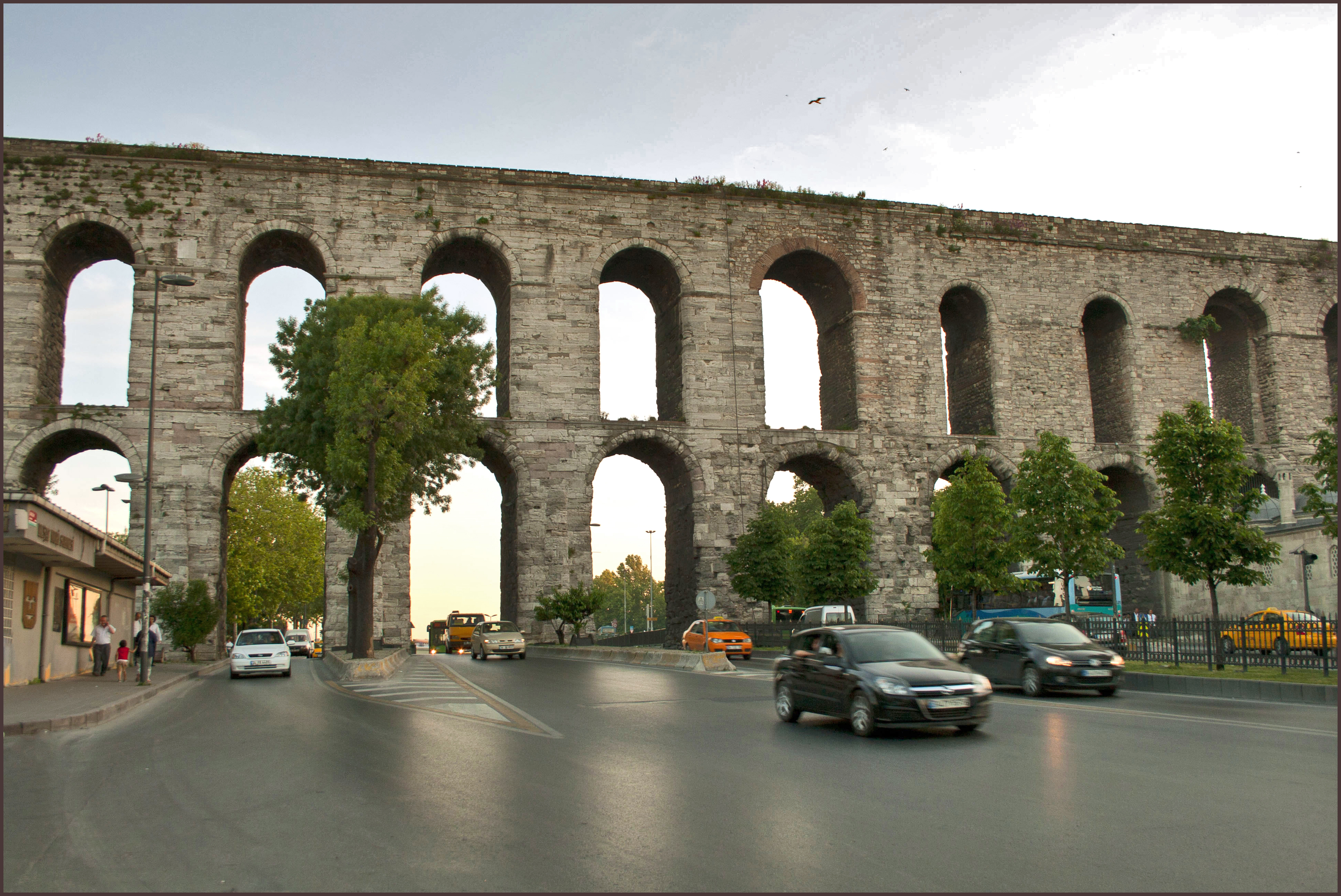
The Bozdoğan Kemeri bridge of the Aqueduct of Valens crossing Atatürk Boulevard seen from southwest

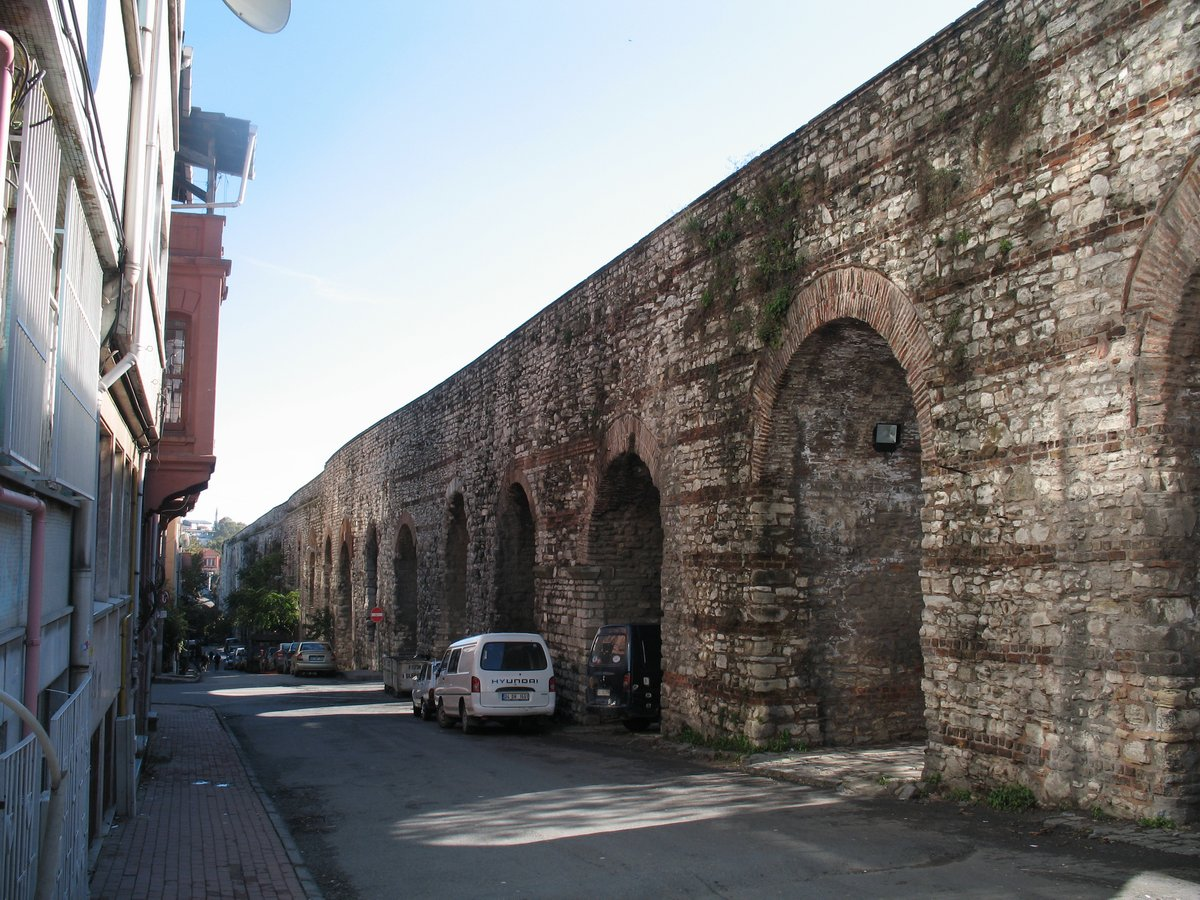
The western part of the Bozdoğan Kemeri seen from the north

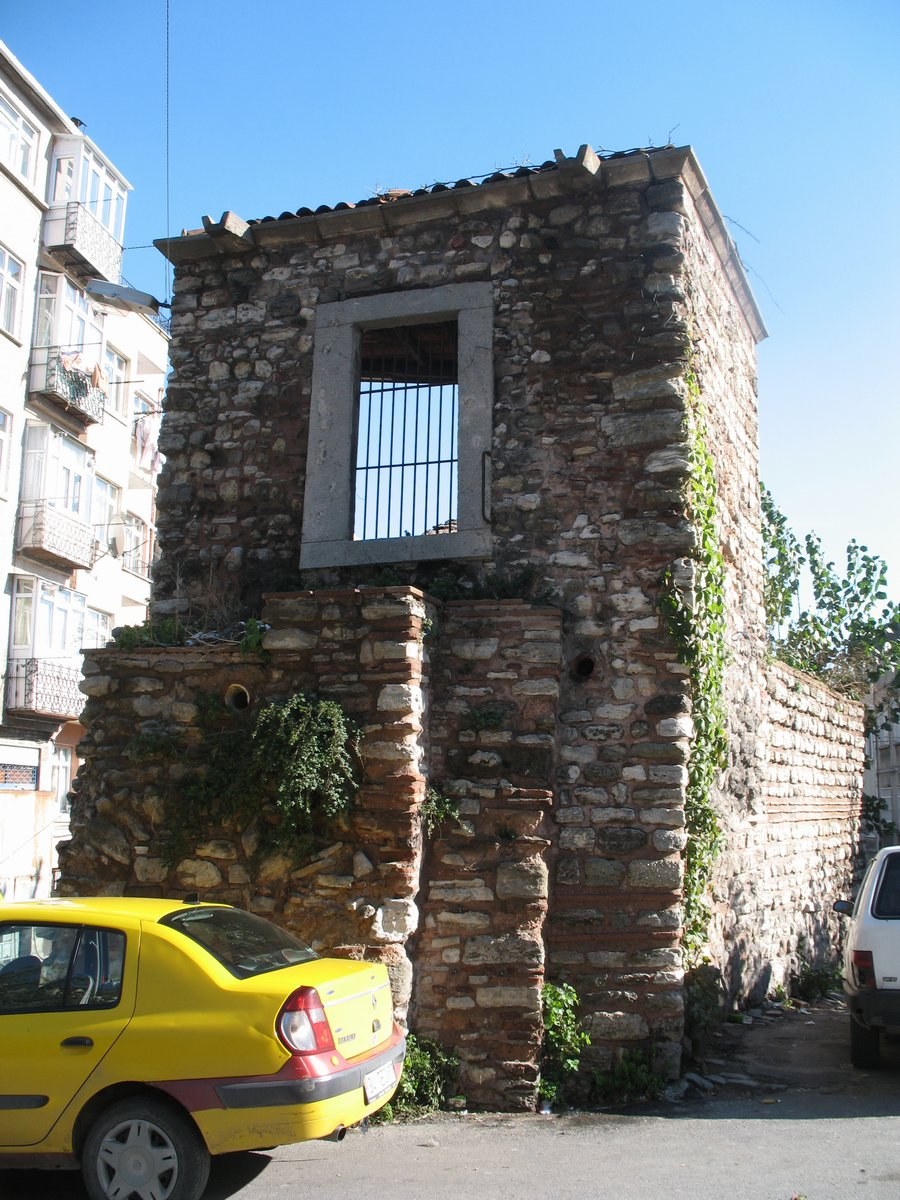
Western end of the Bozdoğan Kemeri

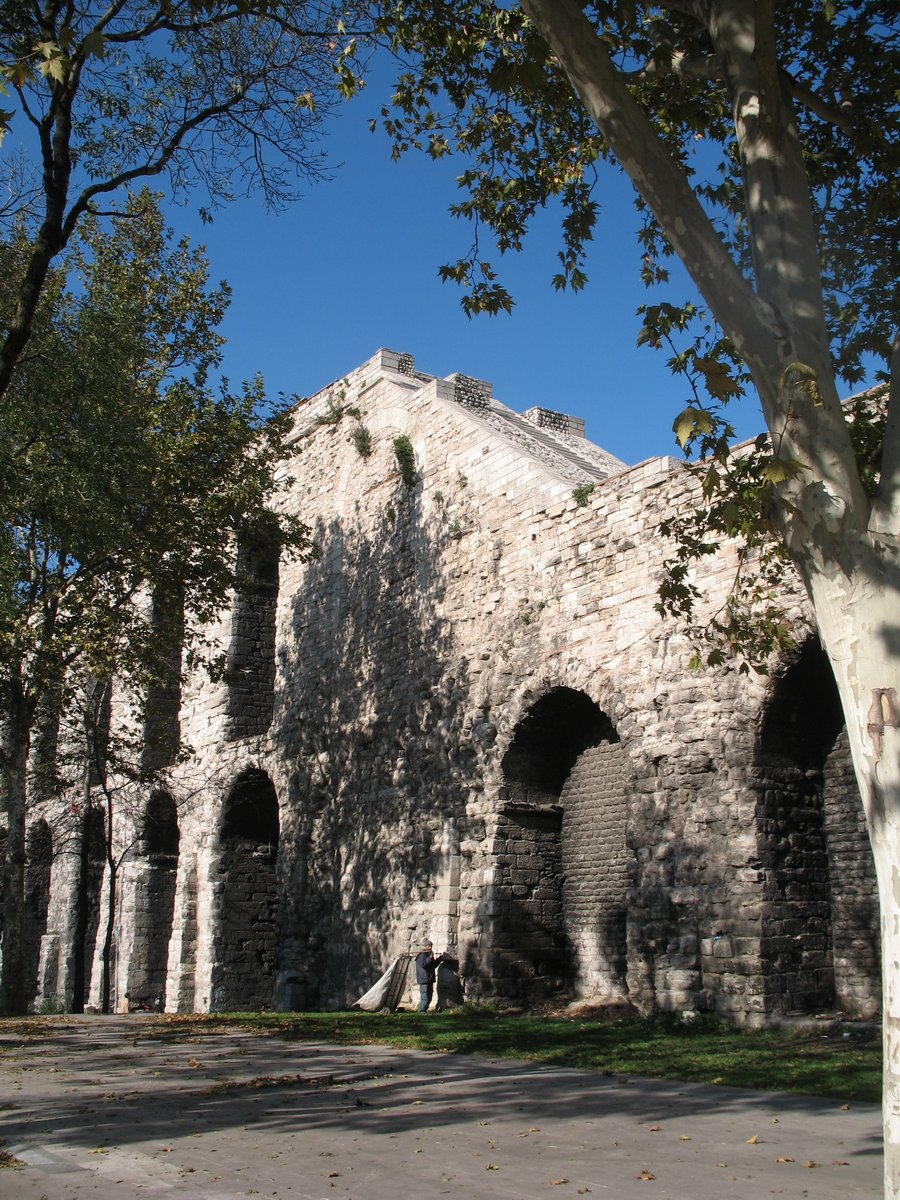
Eastern part of the Bozdoğan Kemeri seen from the south

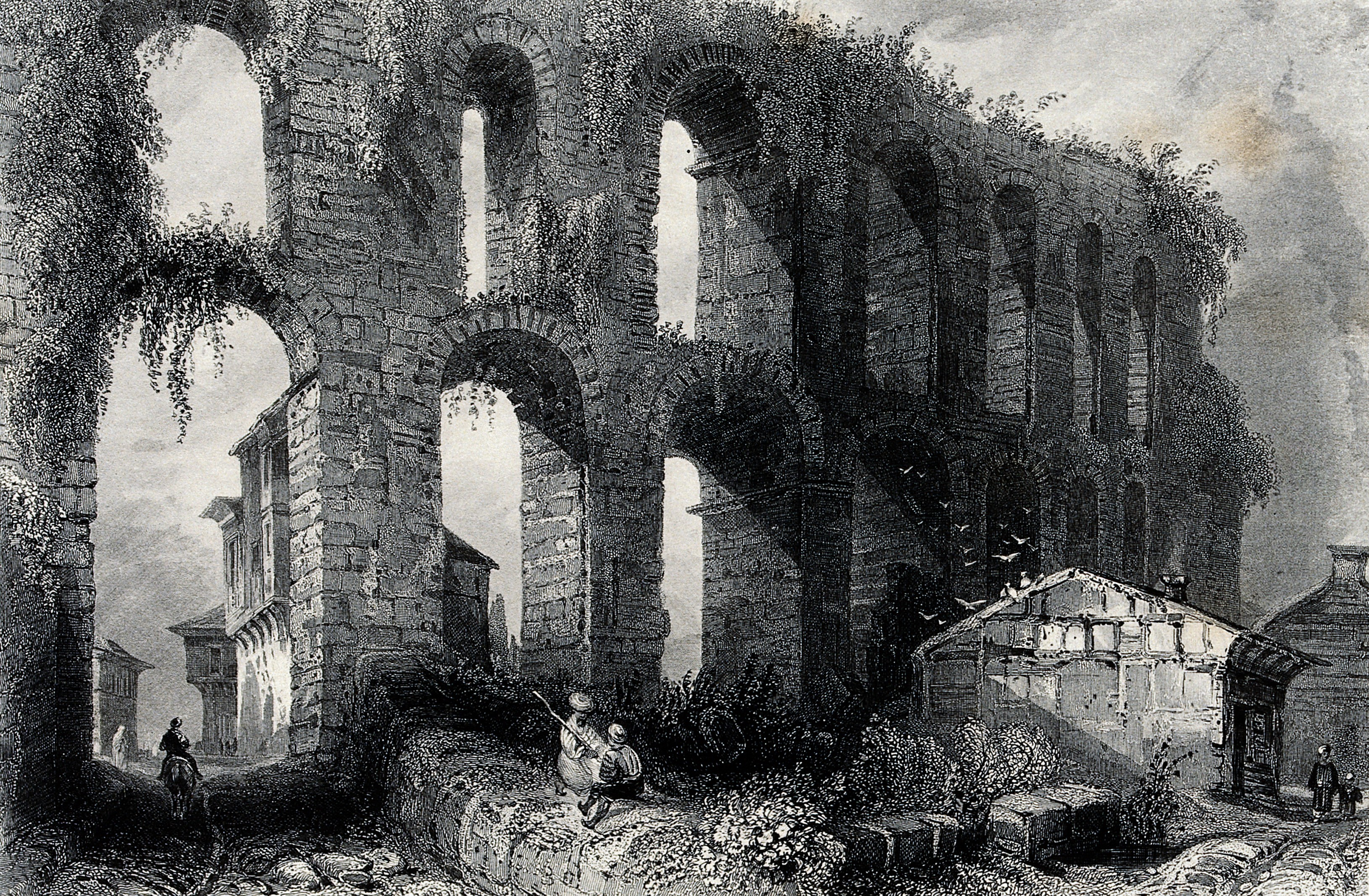
19th century engraving of the Valens Aqueduct by Joseph Clayton Bentley after William Henry Bartlett

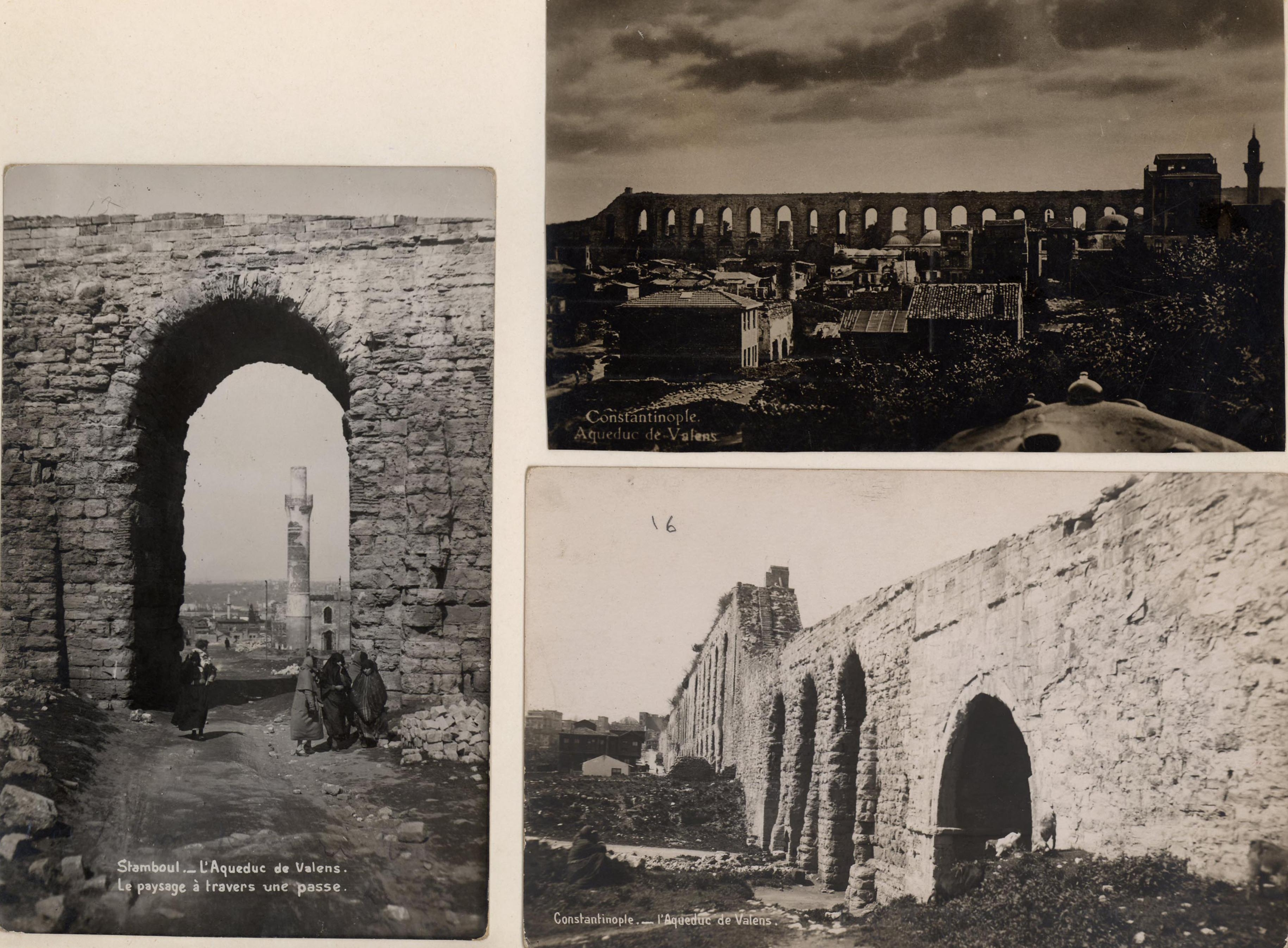
Historical photographs of the Bozdoğan Kemeri

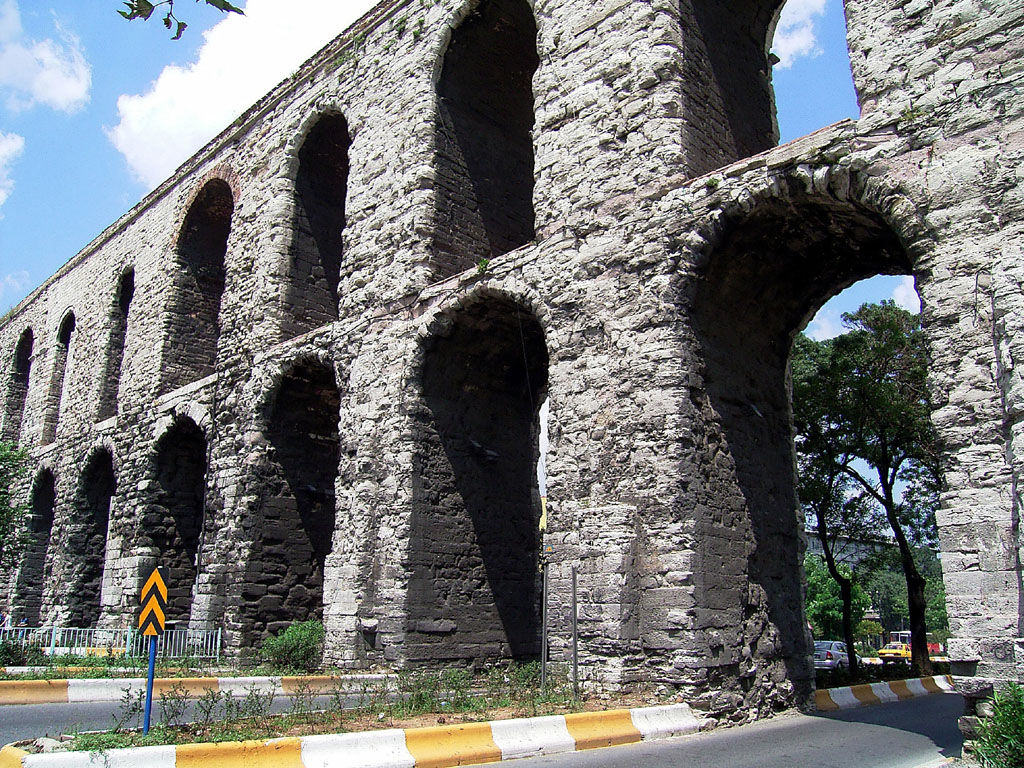
Piers of the Bozdoğan Kemeri seen from the south

== History ==
The construction of a water supply system for the city of Byzantium began under the Emperor Hadrian. Constantine the Great re-founded the city and greatly expanded it which meant that demand for fresh water greatly increased.

The Valens aqueduct, which originally sourced its water from the slopes of the hills between Kağıthane and the Sea of Marmara, was merely one of the terminal points of this new wide system of aqueducts and canals—which eventually reached over 250 kilometres (160 mi) in total length, the longest such system of antiquity—that stretched throughout the hill-country of Thrace and provided the capital with water. Once in the city, the water was stored in three open reservoirs and over a hundred underground cisterns, such as the Basilica Cistern, with a combined capacity of over one million cubic metres.

The water comes from two lines from the north-east and one coming from the north-west, which join together outside the walls, near the Adrianople Gate (Edirne Kapı). Near the east end of the aqueduct there is a distribution plant, and another lies near Hagia Sophia. The water feeds the zone of the imperial palace. The daily discharge in the 1950s amounted to 6,120 cubic metres (216,000 cu ft). During Byzantine times, two roads important for the topography of medieval Constantinople crossed under the eastern section of the aqueduct.

=== Roman period ===
The exact date that construction on the aqueduct began is uncertain, but it was completed in 368 AD during the reign of Valens, whose name it bears. The spectacular Bozdoğan Kemeri section lay along the valley between the third and fourth hills of Constantinople, occupied respectively at that time by the Capitolium and the Church of the Holy Apostles. According to tradition, the aqueduct bridge was built using the stones of the walls of Chalcedon, pulled down as punishment in 366 after the revolt of Procopius. The structure was inaugurated in 373 by the urban prefect Clearchus, who commissioned a Nymphaeum Maius in the Forum of Theodosius, that was supplied with water from the aqueduct. After a severe drought in 382, the Emperor Theodosius I built a new line (the Aquaeductus Theodosiacus), which took water from the north-eastern region known today as the Belgrade Forest.

In the 4th century, Gregory of Nazianzus described the Aqueduct of Valens as an "underground and aerial river" (Patristic Greek: ὁ ὑποχθόνιος καὶ τὸ ἀέριος ποταμός, romanized: ho hypokhthónios kai tò aérios potamós). According to Themistius, the first phase of the aqueduct's construction was 1,000 stadia in length – 185 kilometres (115 miles). This was thought to be an exaggeration until archaeological survey revealed the 227-kilometre (141-mile) course of the channel from Danımandere to Constantinople, with another 41-kilometre (25-mile) line to Pınarca making the total system inaugurated by Valens 268 kilometres (167 miles) long. Likewise, the claim of Hesychius of Miletus in the Patria of Constantinople that the aqueduct extended to Vize (Medieval Greek: Βιζύη, romanized: Bizyē) was correct. The second, 5th-century phase of the Aqueduct of Valens – 451 kilometres (280 mi) long – carried water from springs at Pazarlı, at Ergene, and near Binkılıç. Although the routes of the two phases were partly parallel, eventually merging at the Kumarlidere bridge, the water of the two systems was kept separate.

The aqueduct fed three large open-air cisterns in parts of the city outside the 4th-century Constantinian Walls: the Cistern of Mocius (Turkish: Altımermer Çukurbostanı), the Cistern of Aspar (Sultan Selim Çukurbostanı), and the Cistern of Aetius (Karagümrük Çukurbostanı). These cisterns were enclosed by the longer circuit of the Theodosian Walls built in the 5th century. The Cistern of Mocius was probably the last of these to be completed; its construction is attributed to Anastasius I (r. 491–518) by the Patria of Constantinople, an attribution plausible from the evidence of Roman brick stamps. Together, these three cisterns could hold approximately 607,715 cubic metres (21,461,300 ft^{3}) of water. Another two open-air cisterns inside the Constantinian Walls were both fed by the Aqueduct of Valens: one at Saraçhane and the other on Bab-ı Ali Caddesi. The main reservoir terminus fed by the aqueduct was probably the Cistern of Philoxenos (Turkish: Binbirdirek, lit. 'thousand-and-one columns').

The cutting of the aqueduct by the forces of Theodoric the Amal in 486 may have been the impetus for the construction of the Cistern of Mocius and the Anastasian Wall. This fortification ran between the Black Sea in the north to the Propontis in the south, enclosing the entire peninsula 65 kilometres (40 miles) away from the Theodosian Walls, protecting the length of the aqueduct as far as the springs at Pınarca, as well as the entire length of the earlier Aqueduct of Hadrian.

Under Emperor Theodosius II (r. 402–450), the aqueduct's water was directed exclusively to the Nymphaeum, the Baths of Zeuxippus and the Great Palace of Constantinople. The aqueduct, possibly damaged by an earthquake, was restored under Justinian the Great (r. 527–565), who connected it with the cistern of the "basilica of Illus" (identified today either with the Basilica Cistern (Turkish: Yerebatan Sarnıcı) or with the Binbirdirek Cistern), and was repaired in 576 by Justin II (r. 565–578), who built a separate pipe.

=== Middle Byzantine period ===
The aqueduct was cut by the Avars during the siege of 626; the supply was only reestablished after the great drought of 758 by the Emperor Constantine V (r. 741–775). He had the whole water supply system repaired by a certain Patrikios, who used a large labour force that was taken from Greece and Anatolia.

Other maintenance works were accomplished under the Emperor Basil II (r. 960–1025) in 1019 and later under Romanos III Argyros (r. 1028–1034).

In 1075, the official in charge of the aqueduct's maintenance was Basil Maleses, the protovestes and former judge recorded by the Greek historian Michael Attaleiates as having been captured by Alp Arslan's Seljuks at the Battle of Manzikert. Basil's office, known in Byzantine Greek as: λογοθέτης τω̑ν ὑδάτων, romanized: logothétēs tōn hydátōn, lit. 'logothete of the waters' and attested only from Attaleiates's history, was descended from the official in charge of aqueducts mentioned by Frontinus one millennium earlier in the Roman imperial period.

After the First Crusade's passage through Constantinople, both William of Malmesbury and Odo of Deuil mentioned the working Aqueduct of Valens in their histories. William of Malmesbury claimed that the Danube's water was carried into the city by hidden channels and washed the dirt from Constantinople, while Odo of Deuil stated that "from the outside conduits flow in, bringing the city an abundance of water". At this time, the city was the largest in Christian Europe, its population sustained by the water supply.

=== Late Byzantine period ===
Andronikos I Komnenos was the last Byzantine emperor who maintained the aqueduct. It was not maintained during the Latin Empire nor during the Palaiologan period. By that time the population of the city had shrunk to about 40,000–50,000 inhabitants, so that the water supply was no longer a very important issue. Nevertheless, according to Ruy Gonzáles de Clavijo, a Castilian diplomat who traveled to Constantinople en route to an embassy to Timur in 1403, the aqueduct was still functioning.

=== Ottoman period ===
After the fall of Constantinople (1453) the Ottoman sultan, Mehmed the Conqueror (r. 1444–1446, 1451–1481), repaired the system. The water was then used to supply the imperial palaces of Eski Saray (Old Palace) and Topkapı Sarayı. The system was enhanced by a new connection from the northeast. The great earthquake of 1509 destroyed the arches near the Mosque of Şehzade, which was erected some time later. This gave rise to the popular legend that they were cut in order to allow a better view from the nearby mosque. The repairs to the network continued under Bayezid II (r. 1481–1512), who added a new line.

Around the middle of the 16th century, Suleiman the Magnificent (r. 1520–1566) rebuilt arches (now ogival) 47 up to 51 (counted from the west) near the Şehzade Mosque, and commissioned the imperial architect, Mimar Sinan, to add two more lines, coming from the Forest of Belgrade (Belgrad Ormanı). The increased flow allowed the distribution of water to the Kιrkçeşme ("Forty Fountains") quarter, situated along the aqueduct on the Golden Horn side, and so called after the many fountains built there under Suleyman.

Under Mustafa II (r. 1695–1703), five arches (41–45) were restored, respecting the ancient form. An inscription in situ, dated 1696/97, commemorates the event. His successor Ahmed III repaired again the distribution net.

In 1912, a 50-metre-long (160 ft) part of the aqueduct near the Fatih Mosque was pulled down. In the same period, a new modern Taksim ("distribution plant", lit. 'division') at the east end was erected.

== Bozdoğan Kemeri ==
The Bozdoğan Kemeri bridge of the Aqueduct of Valens had a length of 971 metres (3,186 ft) and a maximum height of about 29 metres (63 metres above sea level) with a constant slope of 1:1000. Arches 1–40 and 46–51 belong to the time of Valens, arches 41–45 to Mustafa II, and those between 52 and 56 to Suleiman I. Arches 18–73 have a double order, the others a single order.

Originally the structure ran perfectly straight, but during the construction of the Fatih Mosque – for unknown reasons – it was bent in that section. The masonry is not regular, and uses a combination of ashlar blocks and bricks. The first row of arches is built with well-squared stone blocks; the upper row is built with four to seven courses of stones alternated with a bed of smaller material (opus caementitium) clamped with iron clamps. The width of the aqueduct bridge varies from 7.75 metres to 8.24 metres. The pillars are 3.70 metres thick, and the arches of the lower order are 4 metres wide. As a result of geophysical surveys performed in 2009, it is now known that pillars' foundations are approximately 5.4–6.0 metres below the present-day surface.

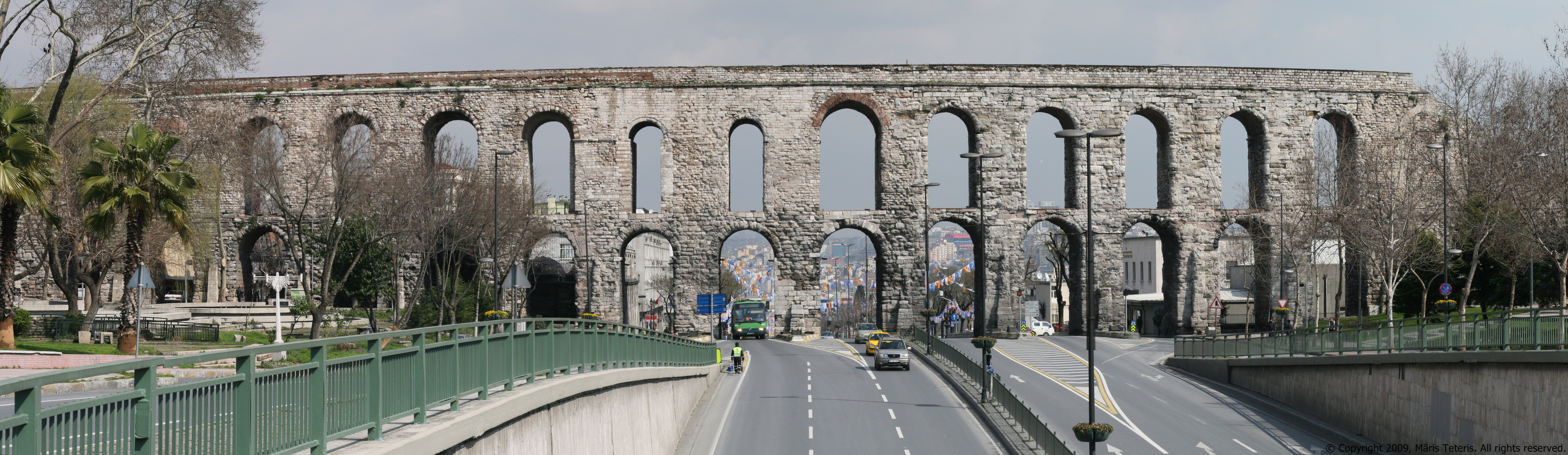
A panoramic view of the Aqueduct of Valens

== See also ==
- Ballıgerme

== Notes ==
a: The Nymphaeum, which was called "abundant water" (δαψιλές ὔδωρ, dapsilés hýdor in Greek), was one of the four Nymphaea existing in the city in the first third of the 4th century. Its basin was still functioning in 1577.
b: Illus was a magister militum, who played an important role under Emperors Leo I and Zeno. Justinian enlarged an already existing cistern built by Constantine, which was placed under the quadriporticus of the Basilica.

== Sources ==
- Janin, Raymond (1964). Constantinople Byzantine (in French) (2 ed.). Paris: Institut Français d'Etudes Byzantines.
- Mamboury, Ernest (1953). The Tourists' Istanbul. Istanbul: Çituri Biraderler Basımevi.
- Eyice, Semavi (1955). Istanbul. Petite Guide a travers les Monuments Byzantins et Turcs (in French). Istanbul: Istanbul Matbaası.
- Gülersoy, Çelik (1976). A Guide to Istanbul. Istanbul: Istanbul Kitaplığı. OCLC 3849706.
- Müller-Wiener, Wolfgang (1977). Bildlexikon zur Topographie Istanbuls: Byzantion, Konstantinupolis, Istanbul bis zum Beginn d. 17 Jh (in German). Tübingen: Wasmuth. ISBN 978-3-8030-1022-3.
- Evans, J.A.S. (1996). The Age of Justinian: The Circumstances of Imperial Power. Routledge.
- Freely, John (2000). Blue Guide Istanbul. W. W. Norton & Company. ISBN 0-393-32014-6.
