= Climate of Budapest =

Budapest has a humid temperate climate (Köppen: Cfa, Trewartha: Doak) with warm to hot summers and chilly winters. The city's inclusion in this climate zone is a relatively new phenomenon; a humid continental (Köppen: Dfa, Trewartha: Dc) classification was applicable until the early 2010s.

Winter (November until February) is the coldest and cloudiest time of year. Snow falls occasionally. The spring months (March, April and May) see variable conditions, with a rapid increase in the average temperature. Budapest's summer, lasting from June until August, is the warmest time of year. Sudden heavy showers can also occur, particularly in June, in the midst of a heatwave. The autumn in Budapest (September until the end of October) is characterized by less rain than in summer and long sunny days.

== Seasons ==
=== Spring ===
Spring is characterized by abundant sunshine and scattered showers. The temperature starts to rise markedly in April, highs usually reach the 25 °C mark at the end of the month, though short cold spells with lows in the 0–5 °C zone and ground frost may strike even in mid-May.

=== Summer ===
In the summer, prolonged heat waves with highs between 32 and 35 °C interchange with short cooler and wet periods following cold fronts from the West with highs between 18 and 25 °C. Humidity is usually low in the summer, but may rise during more unsettled weather. In the residential suburbs nighttime temperatures are usually cool; in the asphalt jungle of Pest, however, temperatures above 25 °C at midnight are not uncommon. Thunderstorms, some of them violent with strong wind gusts and torrential rainfall, are not rare. The highest temperature ever recorded was 41.6 °C on August 6, 2026.

=== Autumn ===
Highs can stay above 20 °C until the end of October. Nights get colder and the first frost arrives usually in the second week of October. Short cool spells vary with the Indian summer that can last for several weeks. November brings abundant rain, sometimes snow and a drastic fall in temperature (a 10 °C fall throughout the month).

=== Winter ===
Winters are variable and unpredictable. Westerly winds bring mild oceanic air with highs between 5–10 °C, almost no frost and scattered rain or snow showers. Depressions moving in from the Mediterranean can bring snowstorms with 20–40 cm falling in a single day, followed by cold air from Russia. Atlantic depressions and south wind can bring unusually warm weather with highs reaching 15 °C even in January. The Siberian High brings some years a sunny but very cold period lasting for a week or two with lows in the −15–20 °C range. Anticyclones with centres above Western Europe produce cold inversion fog with no change in day and nighttime temperatures, they stay around or a bit under 0 °C. The fog can last for weeks. Mediterranean depressions moving above the inversion fog layer can bring a day or two of freezing rain.

== Data ==
Climate data for Pestszentlőrinc, Budapest (WMO number: 12843) 1991-2020; elevation: 139m
Month	Jan	Feb	Mar	Apr	May	Jun	Jul	Aug	Sep	Oct	Nov	Dec	Year
Record high °C (°F)	18.1 (64.6)	20.6 (69.1)	26.1 (79.0)	32.0 (89.6)	34.0 (93.2)	39.5 (103.1)	40.7 (105.3)	40.0 (104.0)	37.6 (99.7)	30.8 (87.4)	23.4 (74.1)	19.3 (66.7)	40.7 (105.3)
Mean maximum °C (°F)	11.0 (51.8)	13.5 (56.3)	19.4 (66.9)	24.8 (76.6)	28.9 (84.0)	32.8 (91.0)	34.8 (94.6)	34.7 (94.5)	29.3 (84.7)	23.5 (74.3)	16.5 (61.7)	11.2 (52.2)	35.8 (96.4)
Mean daily maximum °C (°F)	3.0 (37.4)	5.8 (42.4)	11.3 (52.3)	17.9 (64.2)	22.6 (72.7)	26.2 (79.2)	28.1 (82.6)	28.0 (82.4)	22.5 (72.5)	16.4 (61.5)	9.4 (48.9)	3.5 (38.3)	16.2 (61.2)
Daily mean °C (°F)	0.0 (32.0)	2.0 (35.6)	6.6 (43.9)	12.4 (54.3)	16.9 (62.4)	20.7 (69.3)	22.5 (72.5)	22.3 (72.1)	16.9 (62.4)	11.3 (52.3)	5.9 (42.6)	0.8 (33.4)	11.5 (52.7)
Mean daily minimum °C (°F)	−2.5 (27.5)	−1.3 (29.7)	2.3 (36.1)	7.1 (44.8)	11.6 (52.9)	15.2 (59.4)	16.7 (62.1)	16.6 (61.9)	12.2 (54.0)	7.2 (45.0)	3.1 (37.6)	−1.4 (29.5)	7.2 (45.0)
Mean minimum °C (°F)	−9.8 (14.4)	−7.6 (18.3)	−3.4 (25.9)	1.5 (34.7)	6.1 (43.0)	10.3 (50.5)	12.4 (54.3)	12.1 (53.8)	7.2 (45.0)	1.5 (34.7)	−3.8 (25.2)	−7.4 (18.7)	−12.1 (10.2)
Record low °C (°F)	−27.1 (−16.8)	−25.0 (−13.0)	−15.5 (4.1)	−7.2 (19.0)	−3.3 (26.1)	0.5 (32.9)	4.0 (39.2)	5.0 (41.0)	−3.1 (26.4)	−9.5 (14.9)	−16.4 (2.5)	−22.0 (−7.6)	−27.1 (−16.8)
Average precipitation mm (inches)	31.0 (1.22)	31.3 (1.23)	31.5 (1.24)	34.6 (1.36)	64.8 (2.55)	65.0 (2.56)	74.0 (2.91)	58.7 (2.31)	51.3 (2.02)	44.0 (1.73)	46.8 (1.84)	38.5 (1.52)	571.5 (22.49)
Average precipitation days (≥ 1.0 mm)	6.1	5.6	5.9	5.7	8.4	6.6	7.6	5.3	5.5	6.2	7.0	7.1	77
Average relative humidity (%)	84	77	66	59.2	63.4	63.9	62	62.9	69.2	76.8	83	84.7	71.0
Average dew point °C (°F)	−4.0 (24.8)	−2.2 (28.0)	0.4 (32.7)	3.7 (38.7)	8.8 (47.8)	11.9 (53.4)	12.8 (55.0)	12.8 (55.0)	10.3 (50.5)	6.3 (43.3)	2.1 (35.8)	−1.7 (28.9)	5.1 (41.2)
Mean monthly sunshine hours	55.4	83.8	137.3	182.1	230.3	248.1	274.2	254.6	197.3	156.4	67.4	47.5	1,934.4
Source 1: NOAA (Dew point and sun 1961-1990)
Source 2:

Climate data for Budapest (WMO station number:12840), (1991–2020 normals, extremes 1870–present)
Month	Jan	Feb	Mar	Apr	May	Jun	Jul	Aug	Sep	Oct	Nov	Dec	Year
Record high °C (°F)	18.1 (64.6)	20.6 (69.1)	26.1 (79.0)	32.0 (89.6)	34.0 (93.2)	39.5 (103.1)	40.7 (105.3)	40.0 (104.0)	37.6 (99.7)	30.8 (87.4)	23.4 (74.1)	19.3 (66.7)	40.7 (105.3)
Mean daily maximum °C (°F)	4.7 (40.5)	7.1 (44.8)	12.3 (54.1)	18.8 (65.8)	23.1 (73.6)	26.8 (80.2)	28.8 (83.8)	28.9 (84.0)	23.1 (73.6)	17.2 (63.0)	10.6 (51.1)	5.1 (41.2)	17.2 (63.0)
Daily mean °C (°F)	1.3 (34.3)	3.1 (37.6)	7.5 (45.5)	13.3 (55.9)	17.6 (63.7)	21.5 (70.7)	23.3 (73.9)	22.9 (73.2)	17.8 (64.0)	12.3 (54.1)	7.2 (45.0)	2.1 (35.8)	12.5 (54.5)
Mean daily minimum °C (°F)	−1.2 (29.8)	0.1 (32.2)	3.9 (39.0)	9.1 (48.4)	12.8 (55.0)	16.3 (61.3)	18.0 (64.4)	17.7 (63.9)	13.3 (55.9)	8.7 (47.7)	4.3 (39.7)	−0.2 (31.6)	8.6 (47.4)
Record low °C (°F)	−27.1 (−16.8)	−25.0 (−13.0)	−15.5 (4.1)	−7.2 (19.0)	−3.3 (26.1)	0.5 (32.9)	4.0 (39.2)	5.0 (41.0)	−3.1 (26.4)	−9.5 (14.9)	−16.4 (2.5)	−22.0 (−7.6)	−27.1 (−16.8)
Average precipitation mm (inches)	33 (1.3)	30.2 (1.19)	31.2 (1.23)	32.5 (1.28)	57.3 (2.26)	60.0 (2.36)	53.7 (2.11)	54.2 (2.13)	46.1 (1.81)	44.1 (1.74)	46.2 (1.82)	37.7 (1.48)	526.2 (20.71)
Average precipitation days (≥ 1.0 mm)	6	6	5.7	5.7	8	6.6	6.4	5.6	5.6	6.7	7.1	6.8	76.2
Average relative humidity (%)	74.3	68.6	59.6	53.8	57.3	58	56.1	56.7	63.3	69.5	74.5	76.5	64.0
Average dew point °C (°F)	−3.9 (25.0)	−2.3 (27.9)	0.0 (32.0)	3.4 (38.1)	8.3 (46.9)	11.4 (52.5)	12.4 (54.3)	12.4 (54.3)	10.2 (50.4)	6.2 (43.2)	1.9 (35.4)	−1.8 (28.8)	4.9 (40.7)
Mean monthly sunshine hours	53.8	83.4	133.4	179.5	233.8	250.6	279.4	253.8	195.7	150.7	65.1	49.2	1,928.4
Average ultraviolet index	2	3	3	5	5	6	6	6	4	3	2	2	4
Source: NCEI(dew point and sun 1961-1990) Weather Atlas (UV)

Climate data for Budapest (1901-2010, extremes 1870-present)
Month	Jan	Feb	Mar	Apr	May	Jun	Jul	Aug	Sep	Oct	Nov	Dec	Year
Record high °C (°F)	18.1 (64.6)	20.6 (69.1)	26.1 (79.0)	32.0 (89.6)	34.0 (93.2)	39.5 (103.1)	40.7 (105.3)	40.0 (104.0)	37.6 (99.7)	30.8 (87.4)	23.4 (74.1)	19.3 (66.7)	40.7 (105.3)
Mean daily maximum °C (°F)	1.2 (34.2)	4.5 (40.1)	10.2 (50.4)	16.3 (61.3)	21.4 (70.5)	24.4 (75.9)	26.5 (79.7)	26.0 (78.8)	22.1 (71.8)	16.1 (61.0)	8.1 (46.6)	3.1 (37.6)	15.0 (59.0)
Daily mean °C (°F)	−1.6 (29.1)	1.1 (34.0)	5.6 (42.1)	11.1 (52.0)	15.9 (60.6)	19.0 (66.2)	22.3 (72.1)	20.2 (68.4)	16.4 (61.5)	11.0 (51.8)	4.8 (40.6)	0.4 (32.7)	10.4 (50.7)
Mean daily minimum °C (°F)	−4.0 (24.8)	−1.7 (28.9)	1.7 (35.1)	6.3 (43.3)	10.8 (51.4)	13.9 (57.0)	15.4 (59.7)	14.9 (58.8)	11.5 (52.7)	6.7 (44.1)	2.1 (35.8)	−1.8 (28.8)	6.3 (43.3)
Record low °C (°F)	−27.1 (−16.8)	−25.0 (−13.0)	−15.5 (4.1)	−7.2 (19.0)	−3.3 (26.1)	0.5 (32.9)	4.0 (39.2)	5.0 (41.0)	−3.1 (26.4)	−9.5 (14.9)	−16.4 (2.5)	−22.0 (−7.6)	−27.1 (−16.8)
Average precipitation mm (inches)	38 (1.5)	37 (1.5)	37 (1.5)	47 (1.9)	64 (2.5)	70 (2.8)	50 (2.0)	50 (2.0)	43 (1.7)	47 (1.9)	60 (2.4)	49 (1.9)	592 (23.6)
Mean monthly sunshine hours	55	84	137	182	230	248	274	255	197	156	67	48	1,933
Source: www.met.hu
