= Elbasan (disambiguation) =

Elbasan is a city in central Albania.

Elbasan may also refer to:

- Elbasan County, an administrative county surrounding Vlorë
- Elbasan District, a former administrative district surrounding Vlorë
- Sanjak of Elbasan, an administrative division in the Ottoman Empire
- Elbasan Gospel Manuscript
- Elbasan script
- Elbasan, Çatalca, a neighborhood in Istanbul
