= Aba (mythology) =

Thracian naiad nymph in Greek mythology

In Greek mythology, Aba (Ancient Greek: Ἄβα, lit. 'wheel, shout') was a Thracian naiad from the town of Ergisce in Ciconia. She became the mother of a son Ergiscus by Poseidon, after whom Çatalca (Ergisce) took its name. Aba is presumed to be a daughter of the river Hébros (Ἕβρος).

== Etymology ==
The source is uncertain, but it is likely related to aúo (αὔω, 'to shout, to call'). It is also speculated that it denotes a large Mediterranean sea-cow. Additionally, it is also coincidentally the Aiolic variation of the Doric word hébe (ἥβη, 'youth').

== Notes ==
- Suida, Suda Encyclopedia translated by David Whitehead. Online version at the Topos Text Project.
