= İnceğiz Cave Monastery =

Greek Orthodox monastery in Çatalca, Istanbul, Turkey

Cave monastery of İnceğiz
- İnceğiz Mağara Manastırı (Turkish)
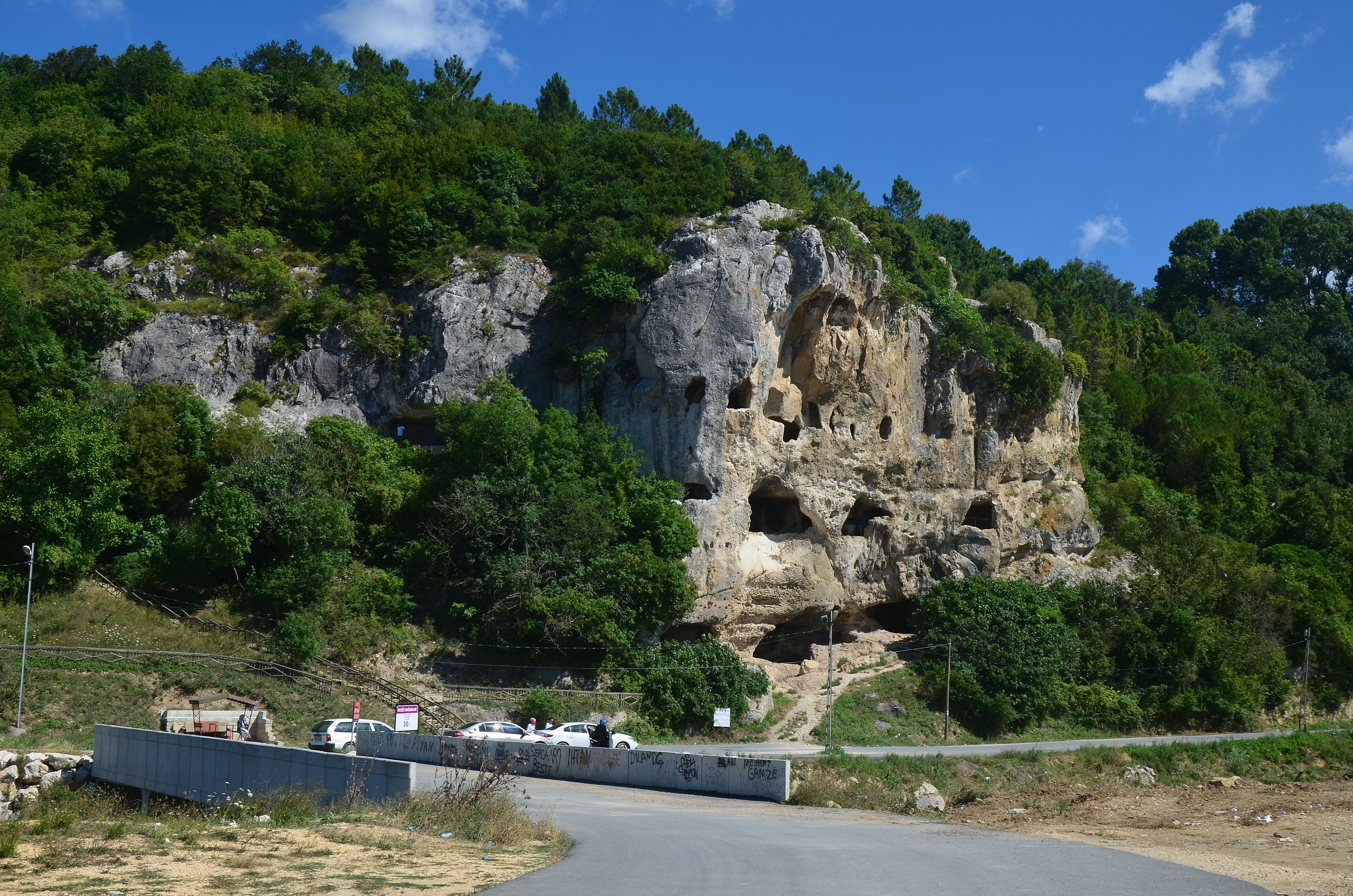

- Location of the cliff dwellings of İnceğiz in Istanbul Province.
- 41°10′54″N 28°24′15″E
- Type: Cliff dwellings
- Location: İnceğiz village, Çatalca, Istanbul Province, Turkey
- Region: Marmara Region

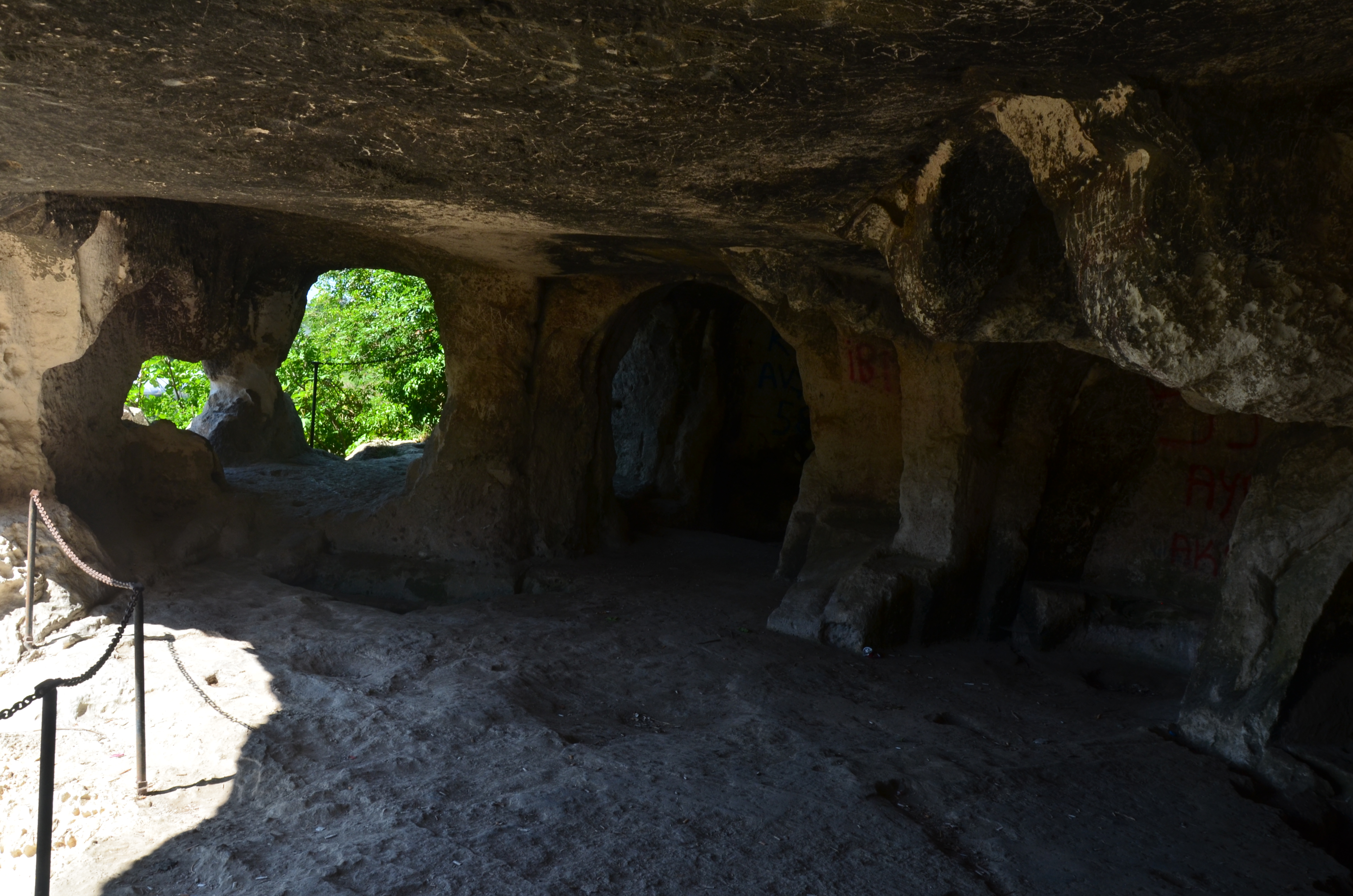
A view of the interior of the cave monastery.

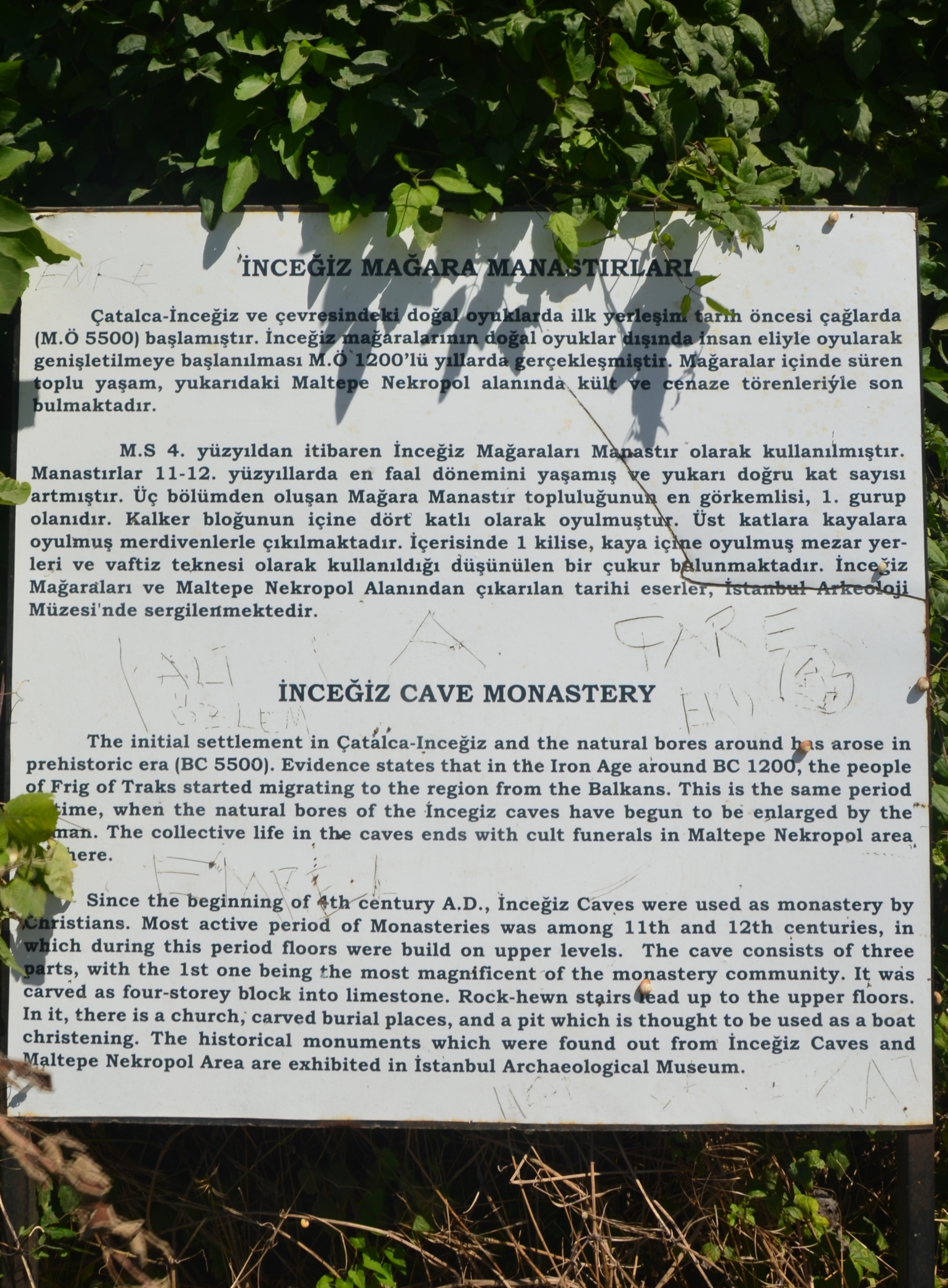
Multilingual inscription for the Cave Monastery of İnceğiz.

The Cave Monastery of İnceğiz (Turkish: İnceğiz Mağara Manastırı) is a cave monastery formed by carving a rocky cliff located in İnceğiz village of Çatalca district in Istanbul Province, northwestern Turkey.

İnceğiz village is located about 9 km (5.6 mi) northwest of Çatalca. The cave monastery is situated at Karasu Valley overlooking Karasu Creek. It is a four-story apartment building of rock-cut architecture. The structure was cut out in limestone formation, which has a suitable lithography for easy forming. The site in the cliff is accessible by a wooden staircase on the trail. The openings of the cliff dwelling are barred by chains.

Initially, the four stories were interconnected. However, due to erosion and earthquakes, some parts of the structure collapsed, and so some of the connections are broken. The first floor contains three rooms. The staircase inside the structure leading from the first floor to the upper floors has broken down while only few steps below the second floor are intact. The second floor is accessible from outside. On the second floor, there is a church measuring 4.50 m × 7 m (14.8 ft × 23.0 ft) with a large crucifix relief on the wall. The dome of the cross-formed room is 2.60 m (8 ft 6 in) in diameter. The third floor contains three rooms including two large ones. On the fourth floor, there is a residence room of size 5 m × 5 m (16 ft × 16 ft) and a chapel.

The cave monastery has been known since the 1950s. It is assumed that it was heavily used by Christians for a while. It is likely that the place was inhabited from the 4th century until the end of the 12th century, and was used as a Byzantine monastery. However, archaeological excavations carried out between 1992 and 1995 revealed that the area was settled even much earlier.
