= Karamandere =

- Neighbourhood
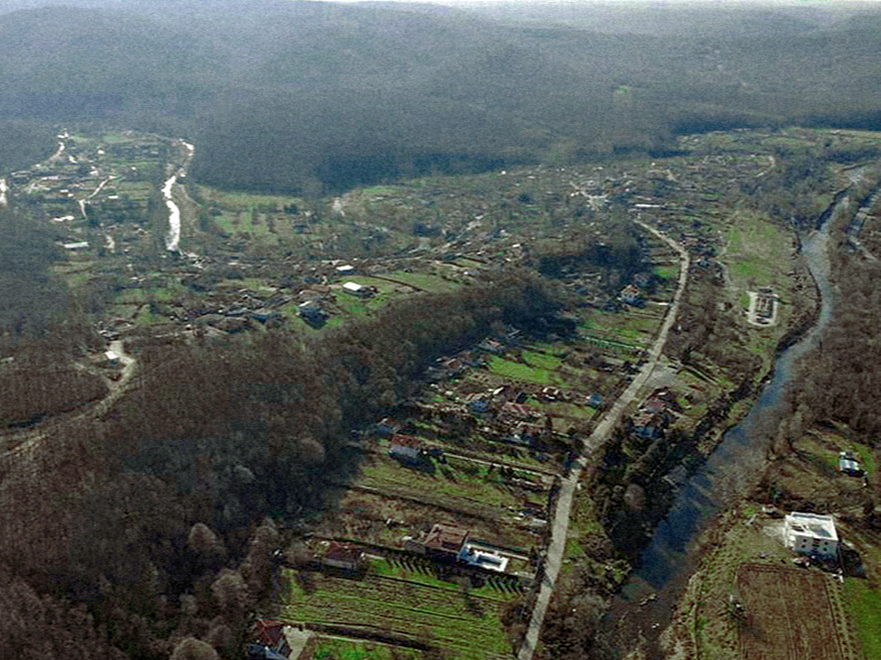

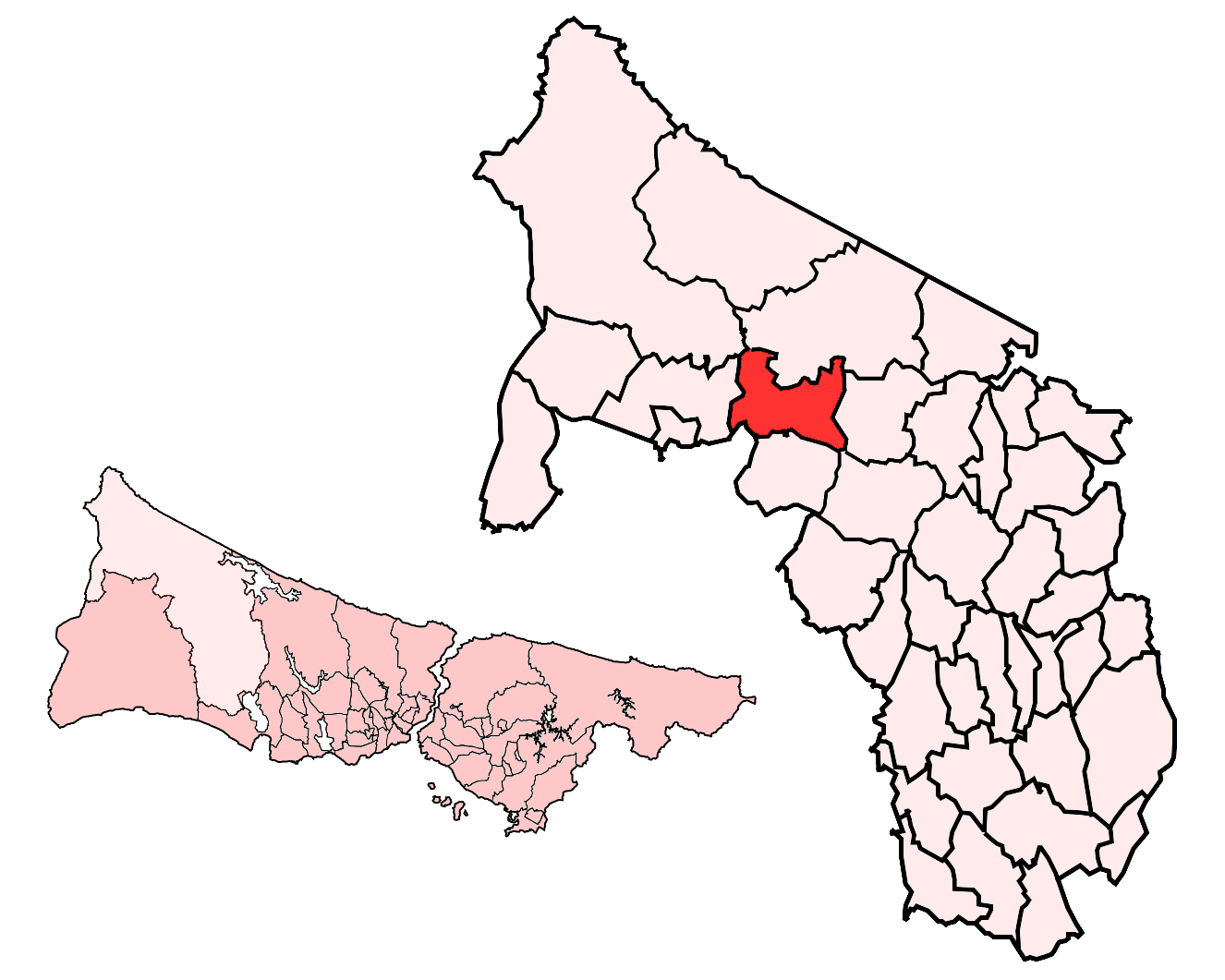

- Location within Turkey Location within Istanbul
- Coordinates: 41°22′27″N 28°18′32″E
- Country: Turkey
- Province: Istanbul
- District: Çatalca
- Area: 29 km^{2} (11 sq mi)
- Elevation: 44 m (144 ft)
- Population (2022): 604
  - Density: 21/km^{2} (54/sq mi)
- Time zone: UTC+3 (TRT)
- Postal code: 34540

Karamandere is a neighbourhood in the municipality and district of Çatalca, Istanbul Province, Turkey. Its population is 604 (2022). It is in the northwest in Çatalca of Istanbul, founded in 1879 by communities immigrating from the Balkan Peninsula.

There is the Black Sea in the northeast, Çilingoz Nature Park in the northwest, D 020 in the south, the state forest in the southeast, Danamandıra Nature Park in the southwest and Durugöl in the east. In the geography there are terraces, gravel, alluvium, stone chips, marble and gneiss, garden agriculture is done. Ferah Hill, Harman Hill and Bostantarla Hill are important peaks. Karamandere Bridge-Karamandere Square and 34-82 highways are important roads. Karamandere Creek, Binkılıç Creek, Mandıra Creek, Yaylacık Creek are important streams and these streams flow into Durugöl. Roman aqueducts and Anastasian Wall are historical buildings around. On important waterways and there are many water sources. Projects related to existing water resources and natural energy resources are planned. There are water distribution organizations, tourism organizations and tourism works. Used for outdoor sports and film industry.

Discussions were held on the problem of old village settlements belonging to the 140 year old Treasury and the issue was presented to the Parliament. With the law passed by the Parliament in 2012, the village legal entity was abolished in 2014 and became a neighborhood.
