= Ergiscus =

Greek mythological figure

In Greek mythology, Ergiscus (Ancient Greek: Ἐργίσκος, romanized: Ergískos) is the son of Poseidon and the naiad nymph Aba. The city of Ergisce (Çatalca) was named after him.
