= Elbasan, Çatalca =

Neighborhood in Istanbul Province, Turkey

Coordinates: 41°08′21″N 28°24′54″E

Elbasan is a neighborhood (formerly a village) in Çatalca District, Istanbul Province, Turkey.

Elbasan is a hillside village located about 9 kilometers from the town of Çatalca and about 62 kilometers from the center of Istanbul. Its population is 676 (2025). Its land area is 16 square kilometers, 93% of which is agricultural. Its climate is classified as humid temperate, typical of the Black Sea coast. Its altitude is 232 meters above sea level. It is bordered on the north by the İnceğiz neighborhood, on the east by the Kaleiçi and Çakıl neighborhoods, on the south by the Ovayenice neighborhood, and on the west by Silivri District.

== Name ==
The name Elbasan means literally "one who presses a hand" (Turkish: el + bas- + -an). The name comes from the area's Elbasan Caves, which feature figures of hands.

The village is also known as Küçük Atina ("Little Athens") because of the large number of Greek-speaking Muslims who were settled there in the 1923 Population Exchange.

== History ==
In 19th-century Ottoman records, Elbasan is listed as kâffe-i ahali zimmeti reaya ("all people dhimmi reaya," in other words, all non-Muslim). In 1840, the village had 25 households, with an estimated population of 125, all non-Muslim.

During the 1923 Population Exchange, 719 Greek-speaking Muslims from Salonika were settled in Elbasan. (As of 2016, the local dialect of Greek could still be heard in the village.)

== Local sites ==
The Elbasan Caves are located near the village.

Northwest of the village is the Karamurat Archeological Site, with ceramic shards and cut stones thought to belong to a Byzantine settlement.

Along a stream southeast of Elbasan is a Greek Orthodox ayazma (holy spring; still standing as of 2024). According to local legend, the ghost of an old woman named Babu haunts the surroundings of the ayazma.

In the square by the village mosque is a fountain with a pool.
