= Yalıköy, Istanbul =

Yalıköy
- Neighbourhood
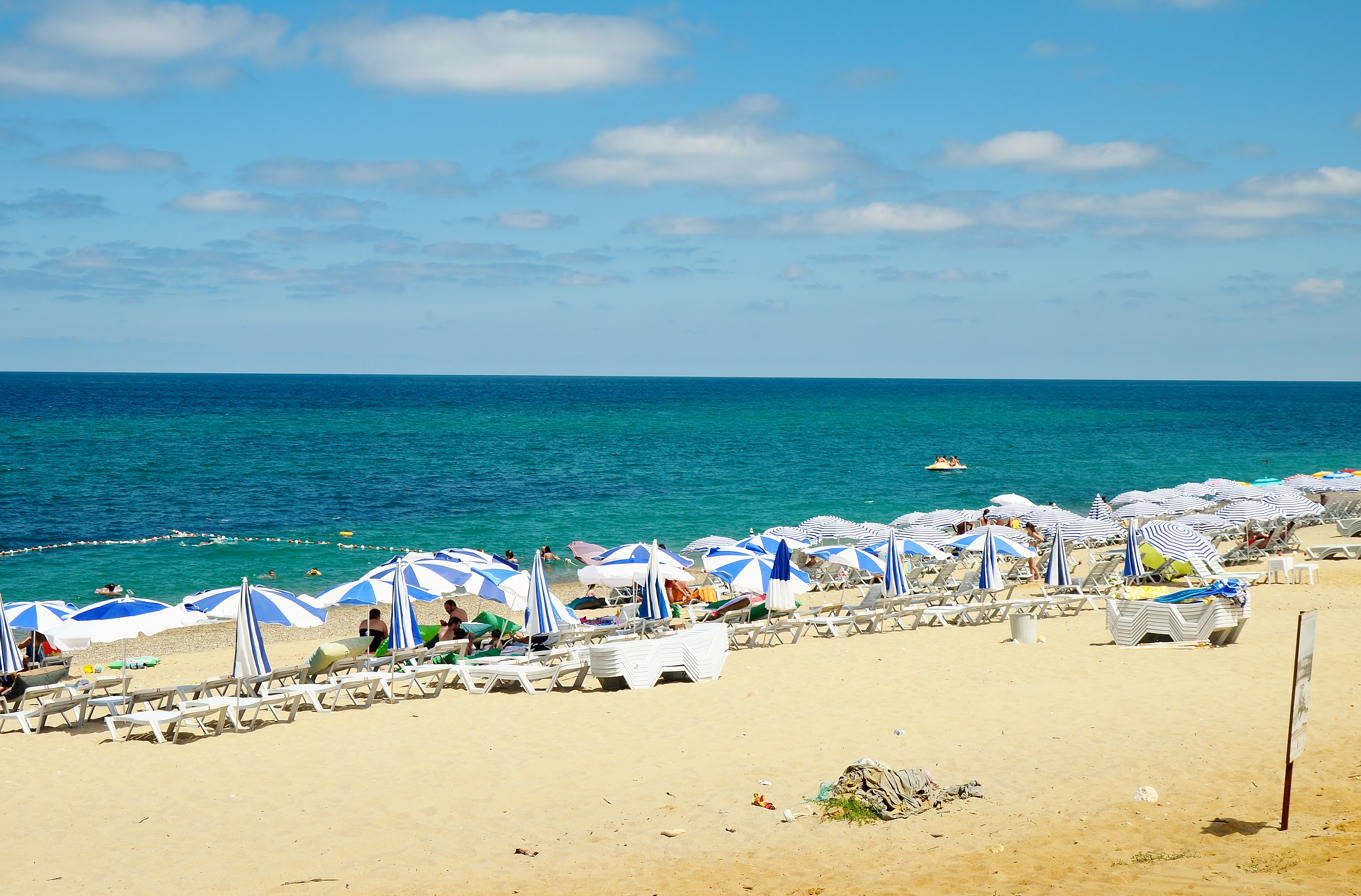
- The beach of Yalıköy.

- Location within Turkey Location within Istanbul
- Coordinates: 41°28′38″N 28°17′40″E
- Country: Turkey
- Province: Istanbul
- District: Çatalca

Government
  - Muhtar: Fehmi Kaçar
- Population (2022): 1,484
- Time zone: UTC+3 (TRT)
- Postal code: 34560
- Area code: 0212

Yalıköy, formerly Podima, is a neighbourhood in the municipality and district of Çatalca, Istanbul Province, Turkey. Its population is 1,484 (2022). Located at the Black Sea coast, it is a seaside resort with a sand beach. Current mukhtar is Fehmi Kaçar.

Yalıköy was historically a Greek town named Potima. During the population exchange between Greece and Turkey in 1923 that followed the Greco-Turkish War (1919–22), around 60 Turkish families from Greece were settled in the homes of exchanged Greeks.

Yalıköy is a coastal town surrounded on three sides by woods of the Strandzha mountain massif. Its sandy beach attracts tourists. The main economy of the village is forestry and fishing. A local production facility of Şişecam mines silicon as raw material for the glass industry. Another local facility operated by the State Hydraulic Works (DSİ) use Yalıköy sand in water purification.

The Çilingoz Nature Park, which offers camping and outdoor recreation activities, is about 10 km (6.2 mi) west of Yalıköy.

Yalıköy is served from Yenibosna in Istanbul by private owned public buses, and from Çatalca by city bus line #404.
