= Hisarbeyli, Çatalca =

Village in Istanbul Province, Turkey

Coordinates: 41°22′07″N 28°28′27″E

Hisarbeyli is a neighborhood (formerly a village) in Çatalca District, Istanbul Province, Turkey. Its population is 368 (2025). Its surface area is 9.1 square kilometers, 77.8% forest and 18% agricultural.

It is bordered on the north by the bed of Lake Durusu, on the east by Lake Durusu and the Celepköy neighborhood, on the south by the Örencik neighborhood, and on the west by the Başak and Çiftlikköy neighborhoods.

== Name ==
In the 19th century, the village was also known as Pınarhisarı.
