= Çilingoz Nature Park =

Nature park in Çatalca, Istanbul, Turkey

- Çilingoz Tabiat Parkı
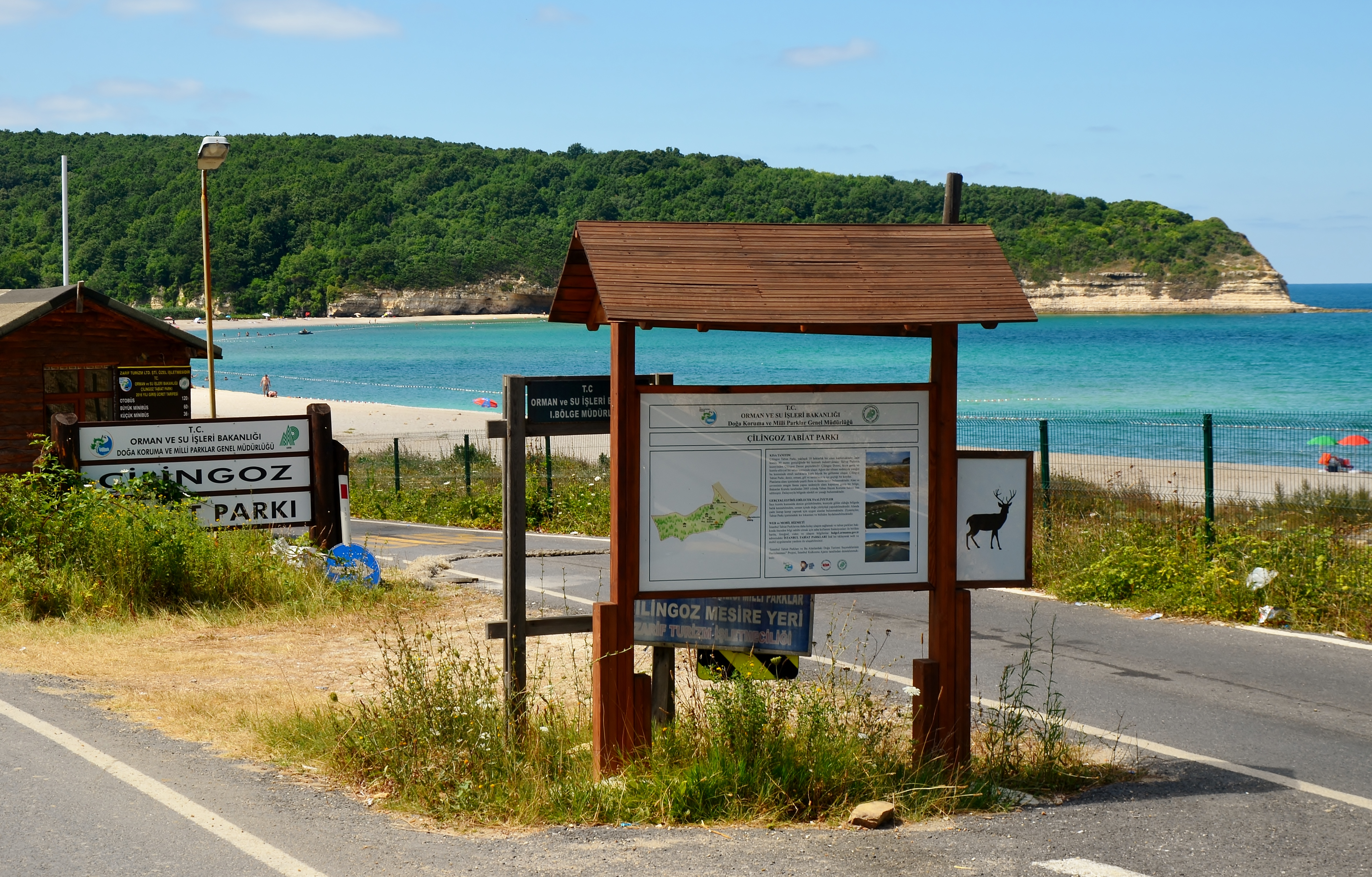
- East entrance to Çilingoz Nature Park.

- Location within Istanbul
- Location: Binkılıç, Çatalca, Istanbul Province, Turkey
- Coordinates: 41°26′39″N 28°12′15″E
- Area: 17.75 ha (43.9 acres)
- Established: 2011

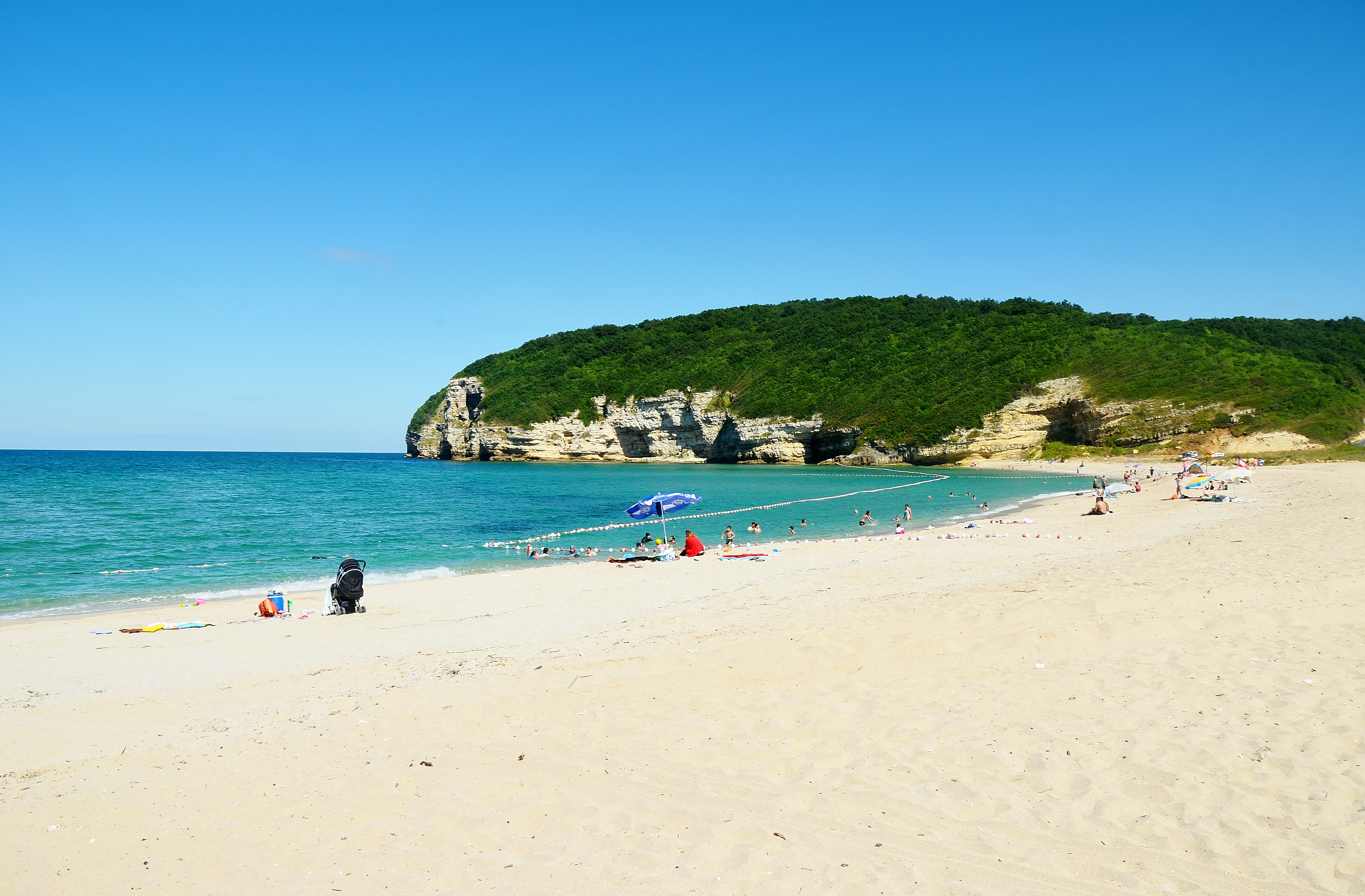
Beach of the nature park.

Çilingoz Nature Park (Turkish: Çilingoz Tabiat Parkı) is a nature park located in Çatalca district of Istanbul Province, Turkey.

Situated at Binkılıç town of Çatalca, northwest of Istanbul on the Black Sea coast, it covers an area of 17.75 ha (43.9 acres). It was established in 2011. The region incorporating the nature park was declared a Wildlife Protection Area for its rich flora and fauna in 2005. Therefore, hunting is continuously forbidden in the region.

The nature park is on a bay featuring the combination of beach, forest, lake and reedy. The park has a 1,200 m (3,900 ft)-long and 80 m (260 ft)-wide beach with fine sand at its north. The Çilingoz Creek flows towards north into the Black Sea creating a sandy-alluvial mouth, which is narrow. There, it forms a large lake surrounded by reedy.

The nature park offers outdoor recreational activities such as camping, angling, hiking and picnicing for visitors. A restaurant and a snack bar serve the visitors. 60 tents are available for rent. Camping season continues until mid September. There is a RV park for recreational vehicles. The 30 wooden bungalows in the park area are for the use of personnel of the Forestry Administration, and can not be rented by visitors. Nearest comfortable lodging opportunity is available in Yalıköy.

== Ecosystem ==
Flora

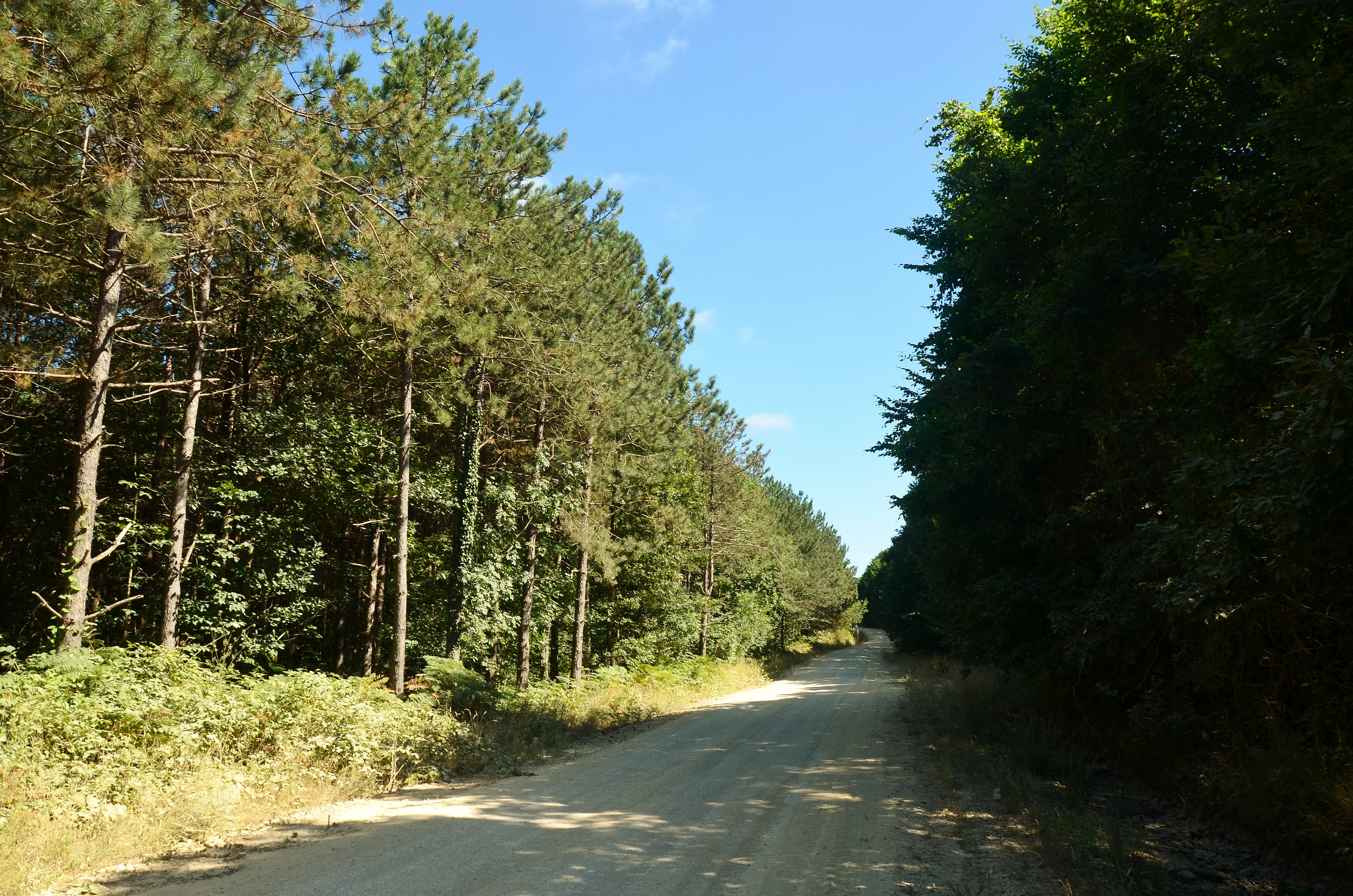
Trees in the nature park.

The nature park is habitat of diverse vegetation. Plants of the wood area are mainly Oriental beech (Fagus orientalis), Oriental alder (Alnus orientalis), European hornbeam (Carpinus betulus) and Turkey oak (Quercus cerris). Shrubs present are common rhododendron (Rhododendron ponticum), butcher's-broom (Ruscus aculeatus), myrtle, (Myrtus communis), laurel (Laurus nobilis), heather (Erica arborea), strawberry tree (Arbutus unedo), blackberry (Rubus), pampas grass (Cortaderia selloana). Observed plants in sandy areas are species such as field eryngo (Eryngium campestre), alkanet (Alkanna tinctoria) and golden-flowered Onosma (Onosma taurica).

Fauna

The nature park has a population of diverse bird species. Some of them are quail, cormorant, Eurasian woodcock, hawk, eagle-owl, woodpecker, common blackbird, stork, magpie, European goldfinch and passer. Mammals of the park are deer, roe deer, fox, European pine marten, wolf, jackal, squirrel, porcupine, hare, mole and tortoise. Fish species found in the waters of coastal area are red mullet, jack mackerel, grey mullet, bonito and thornback ray. Fish species inhabited in the sweet waters are trout, carp, European chub and eel.

== Access and admission ==
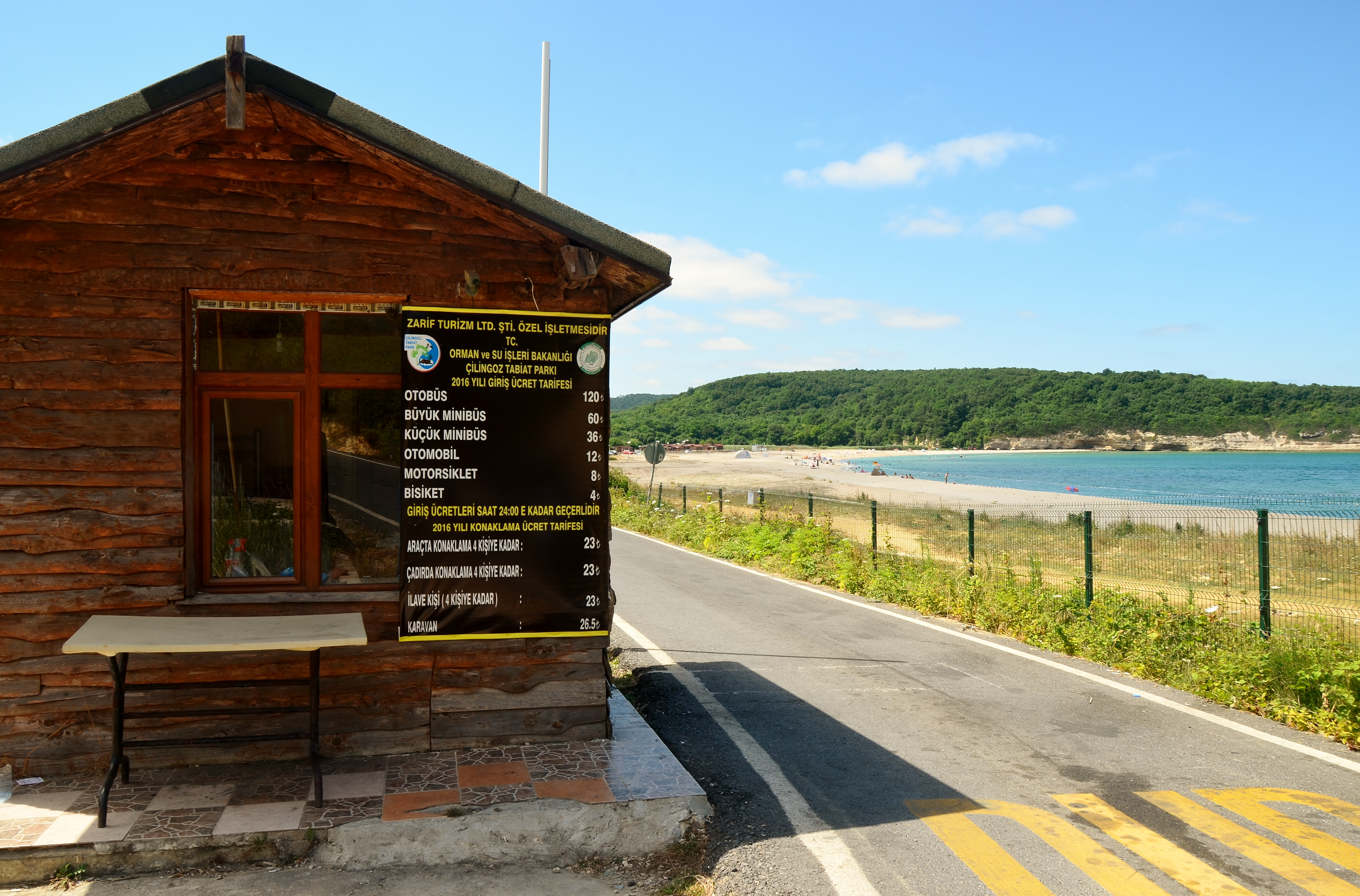
Admission fee list at east entrance.

The nature park can be reached from two directions. When coming from south, Çatalca or Saray on the state road D.020, it is at a distance of 17 km (11 mi) on forest road from Binkılıç. The other route is in the east-west direction, coming from the Lake Terkos and passing through the towns Ormanlı, Karacaköy and Yalıköy. The distance from Yalıköy is 10 km (6.2 mi). Binkılıç and Yalıköy are served by city bus line from Istanbul. A taxi ride is needed to reach the nature park from Binkılıç. There are dolmuş service from Yalıköy.

Admission to the nature park and to the beach is charged for visitors and vehicles. Camping is charged for tents on the overnight basis.
