= Dağyenice, Çatalca =

Village in Çatalca district, Istanbul Turkey

Dağyenice is a neighborhood (formerly a village) in the Çatalca District of Istanbul, Turkey. Its population is 732 (2019).

== Location ==
It is bordered on northeast by the Yazlık neighborhood, on the southeast by the Çanakça neighborhood, on the south by the Kestanelik and Oklalı neighborhoods, and the west by the Kalfa neighborhood, and on the northwest by the Kalfa and Örencik neighborhoods.

== Name ==
The name Dağyenice is said to come from the Turkish phrase dağdan inince ("when one comes down from the mountain").

== Mosque ==
The minaret of the Dağyenice Village Mosque is a registered historical monument.
