= Çatalca =

- District and municipality
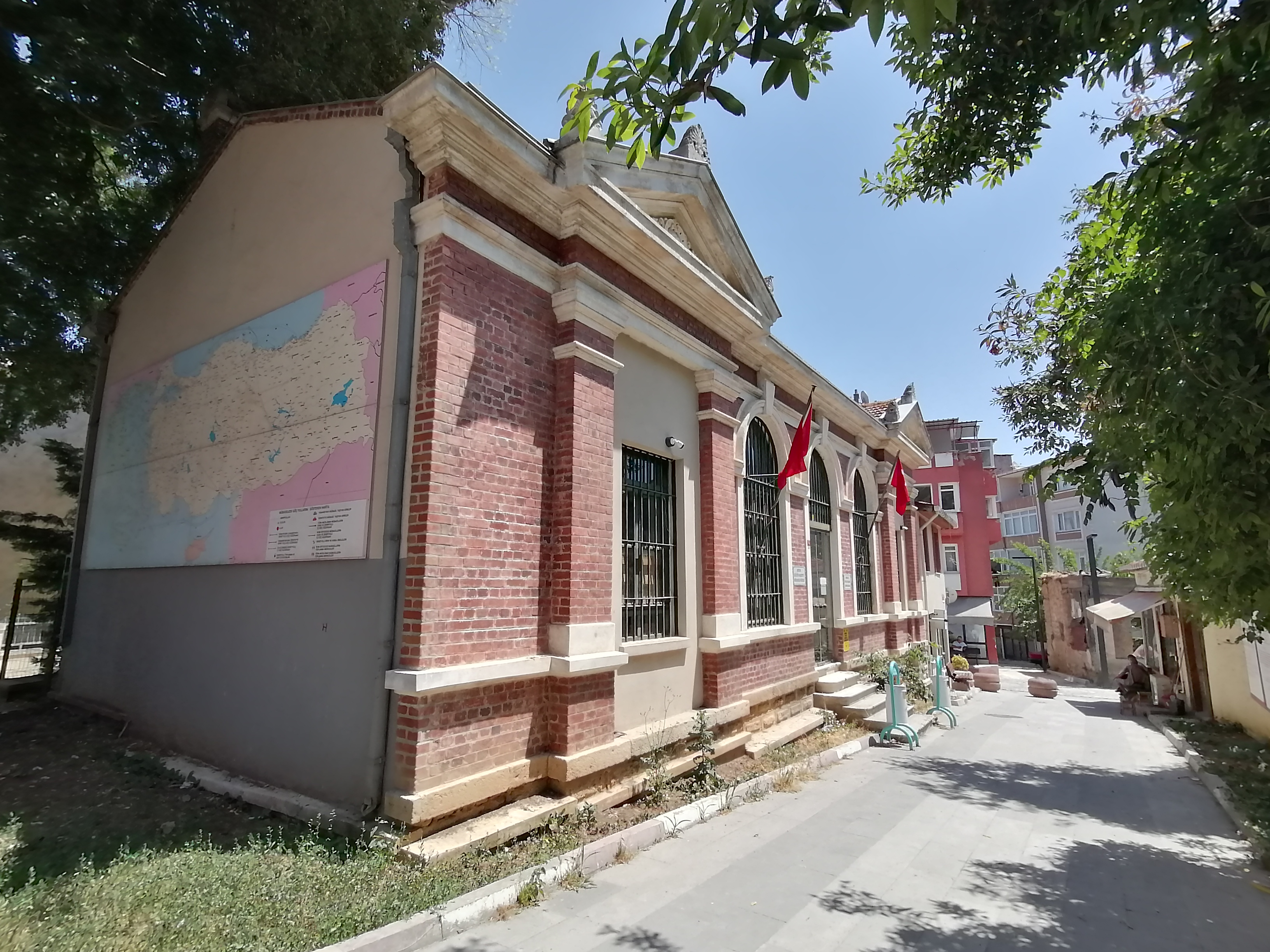
- Çatalca Exchange Museum Side Facade

- Logo

- Map showing Çatalca District in Istanbul Province

- Location within Turkey Location within Istanbul
- Coordinates: 41°08′30″N 28°27′47″E
- Country: Turkey
- Province: Istanbul

Government
  - Mayor: Erhan Güzel (CHP)
- Area: 1,142 km^{2} (441 sq mi)
- Population (2022): 77,468
  - Density: 67.84/km^{2} (175.7/sq mi)
- Time zone: UTC+3 (TRT)
- Postal code: 34540
- Area code: 0212
- Website: www.catalca.bel.tr

Çatalca (Turkish pronunciation: [tʃaˈtaɫdʒa]) is a municipality and district of Istanbul Province, Turkey. Its area is 1142 km^{2}, making it the largest district in Istanbul Province by area. Its population is 77,468 (2022). It is in East Thrace, on the ridge between the Marmara and the Black Sea. Most people living in Çatalca are farmers or owners of vacation homes. Many families from Istanbul come to Çatalca for weekend hiking or picnics.

== History ==
=== Antiquity ===
Modern Çatalca partly lies on the site of Ergisce or Ergiske (Ancient Greek: Ἐργίσκη, romanized: Ergískē), a Greek city in Thrace, located in the region of the Propontis. According to ancient texts, it was named after Ergiscus (Ἐργίσκος), a son of Poseidon through the naiad (nymph) Aba (Ἄβα), presumed in Greek mythology to be a daughter of the river Hebros. Under Roman rule, the city was named Metrae or Metre (Ancient Greek: Μέτραι, romanized: Métrai) and was important enough in the late Roman province of Europa to become a suffragan of its capital Heraclea's metropolitan archbishop, yet was to fade.

=== Modern period ===
Bulgarian bayonet charge at the "Battle of Çatalca"

Çatalca was settled throughout the Ottoman period and according to the Ottoman Official Statistics of 1910 the majority of the area were Greeks. The Crimean War caused a mass exodus of Crimean Tatars towards Ottoman lands. A few Crimean Tatars settled in Çatalca. In the First Balkan War the Bulgarian army had driven the Turkish forces back from the border, but the Turkish forces retreated to the prepared positions at Çatalca where on 16–17 November 1912 they defeated the Bulgarians at the "First Battle of Çatalca". The Çatalca fortifications formed a line across the peninsula, the "Chataldja line", which became the armistice line of 3 December 1912, after Bulgaria decided not to attack Adrianople at that time. Upon expiration of the armistice, on 3 February [O.S. 21 January] 1913, hostilities recommenced and the Second Battle of Çatalca began. It was a series of thrusts and counter-thrusts by both the Ottomans and the Bulgarians and lasted until 3 April 1913. There were a large number of journalists who reported on the military actions at Çatalca, whose accounts provide rich details about this event. According to the Ottoman population statistics of 1914, the kaza of Çatalca had a total population of 30,165, consisting of 16,984 Greeks, 13,034 Muslims, 53 Jews, 44 Armenians, 40 Bulgarians and 10 Roma people. Before 1930, Çatalca also covered present districts of Arnavutköy, Beylikdüzü, Büyükçekmece, western parts of Başakşehir, rural parts of Eyüp and Sarıyer. In 1930 county (bucak) of Kilyos was part of district of Sarıyer, used to be part of Beyoğlu. At same time, villages of Odayeri, Ağaçlı, İhsaniye and Kısırmandıra (Işıklar after 1987) were passed to Kemerburgaz county (formerly part of Beyoğlu district) of Sarıyer. In 1963, villages as Arnavutköy, Bolluca, Hacımaşlı, Haraççı and İmrahor of Boyalık (its center was Hadımköy) county part of district of Gaziosmanpaşa, formerly part of Eyüp. In 1972 Tayakadın village of Boyalık county and Yeniköy one of it were passed to Gaziosmapaşa. In 1987 county of Büyükçekmece was separated and become district. Finally in 2009 remainder of Boyalık county was passed to Arnavutköy, was part of Gaziosmanpaşa and Muratbey village was passed to Büyükçekmece.

== Population ==
Historical population
Year	Pop.	±% p.a.
2007	89,158	—
2012	63,467	−6.57%
2017	69,057	+1.70%
2022	77,468	+2.33%
Source: TÜIK (2007–2022)

== Geography ==
Çatalca has 135 kilometers of coastline. Its neighbors include Tekirdağ Province to the west, Silivri to the southwest, Büyükçekmece to the south, and Arnavutköy to the east.

Fresh water for Istanbul is provided from by lakes Durusu and Çatalca. Yalıköy is a seaside resort of Çatalca. The Çilingoz Nature Park west of Yalıköy offers camping and outdoor recreation activities.

== Composition ==
There are 39 neighbourhoods in Çatalca District:

- Akalan
- Atatürk
- Aydınlar
- Bahşayiş
- Başak
- Belgrat
- Çakıl
- Çanakça
- Celepköy
- Çiftlikköy
- Dağyenice
- Elbasan
- Fatih
- Ferhatpaşa
- Gökçeali
- Gümüşpınar
- Hallaçlı
- Hisarbeyli
- İhsaniye
- İnceğiz
- İzzettin
- Kabakça
- Kaleiçi
- Kalfa
- Karacaköy Merkez
- Karamandere
- Kestanelik
- Kızılcaali
- Muratbey Merkez
- Nakkaş
- Oklalı
- Örcünlü
- Örencik
- Ormanlı
- Ovayenice
- Subaşı
- Yalıköy
- Yaylacık
- Yazlık

== Media ==
At Çatalca, there is a mediumwave broadcasting station with a 226 metres tall mast. It works on 702 kHz with 600 kW.

== Cooperation and parthership ==
Çatalca cooperates with:

- Alanya, Turkey

== Gallery ==
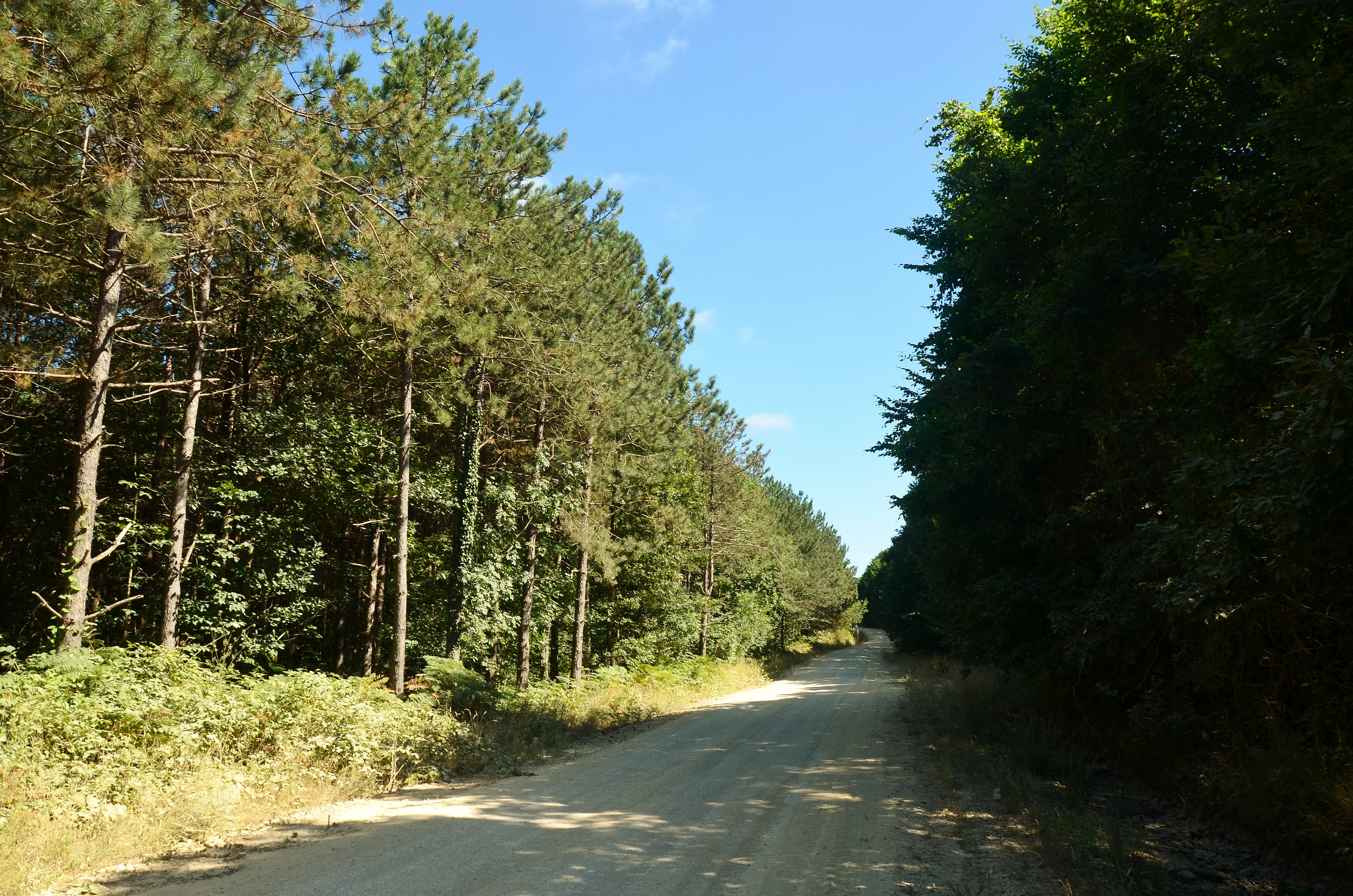
Trees in Çilingoz Nature Park in Çatalca, Istanbul Province.

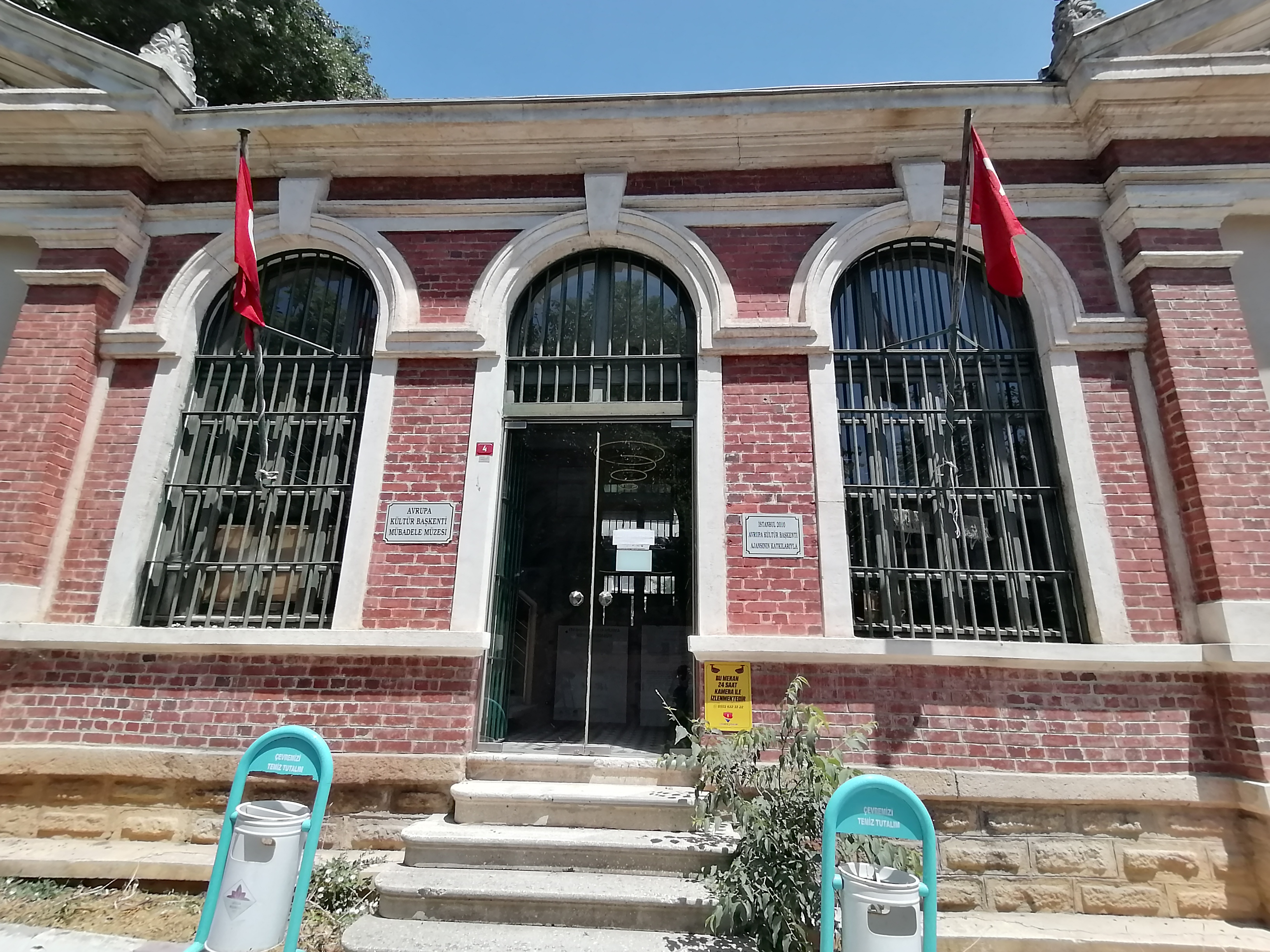
Çatalca Exchange Museum Front Facade

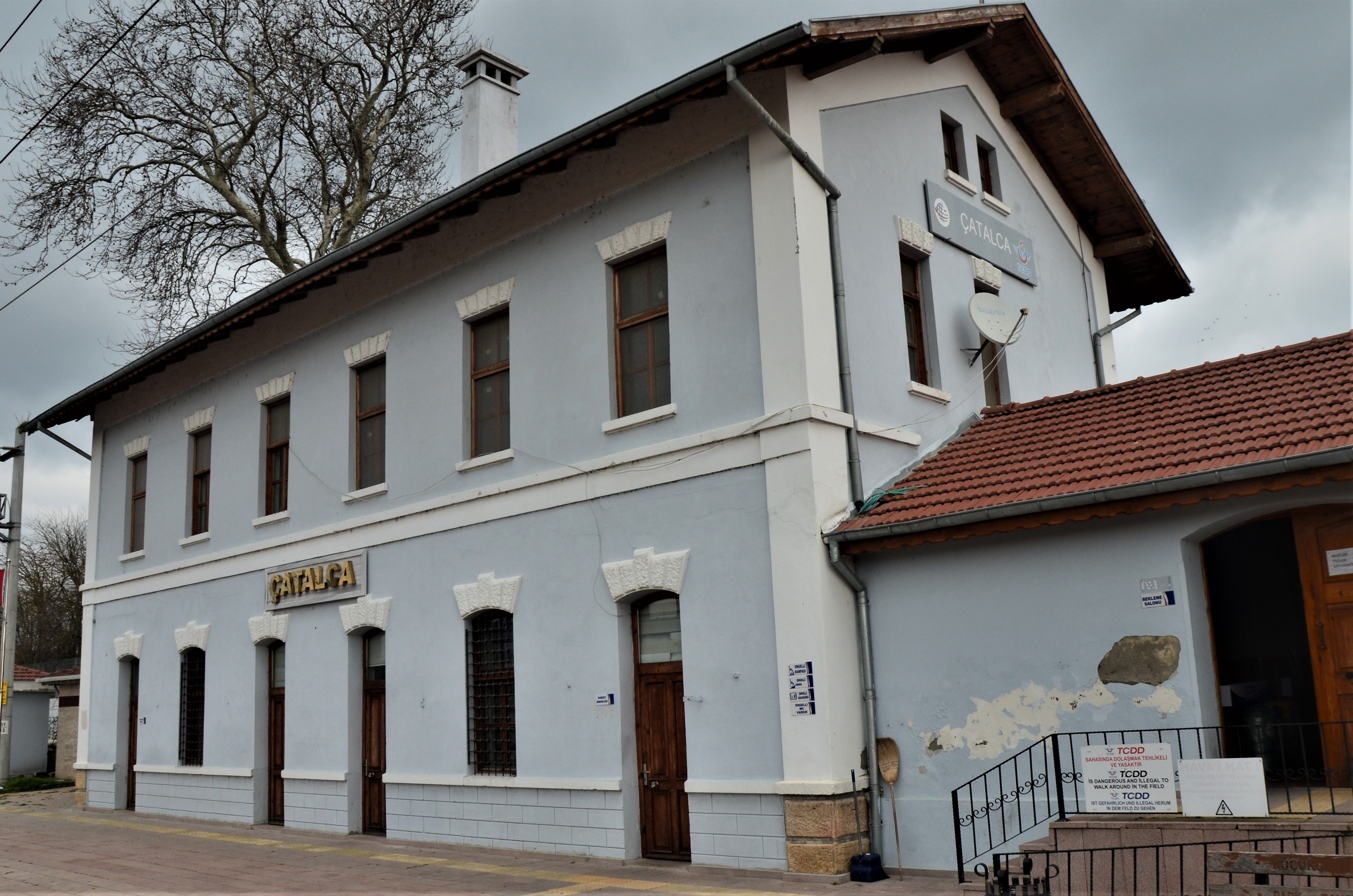
Çatalca Railway Station

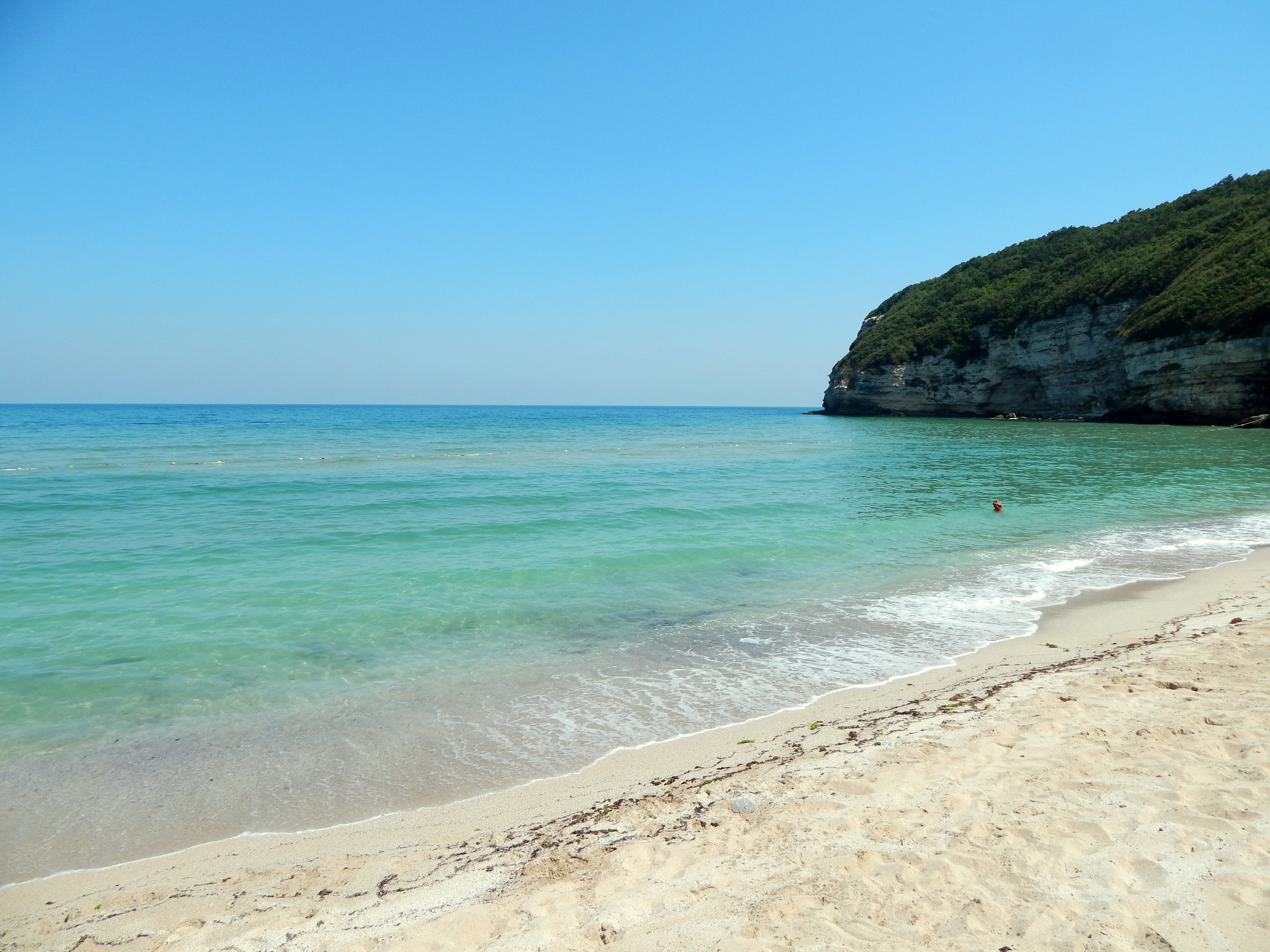
Beach near Yalıköy Köyü

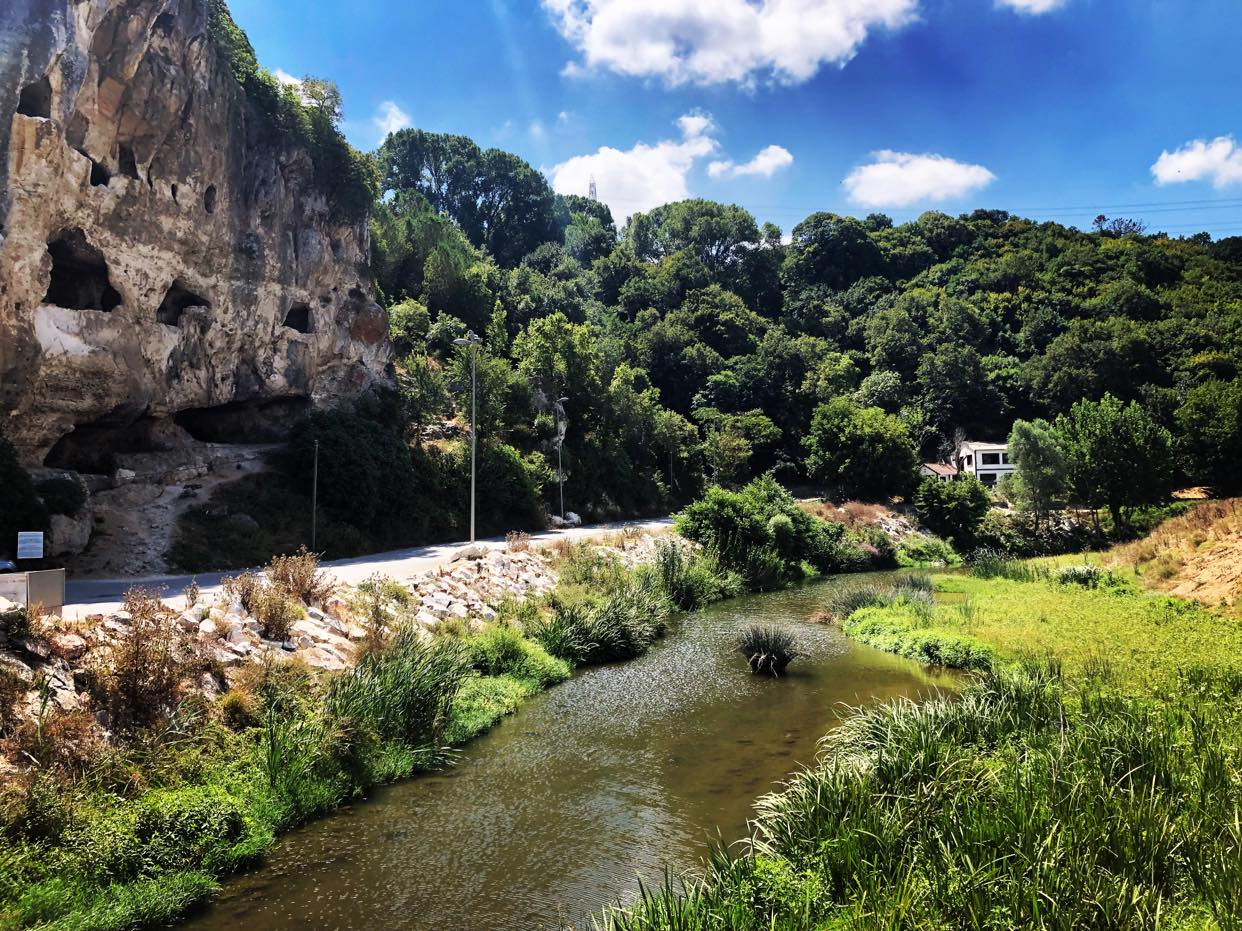
İnceğiz Cave Monastery, Çatalca.
