= Humid temperate climate =

Climate sub-type

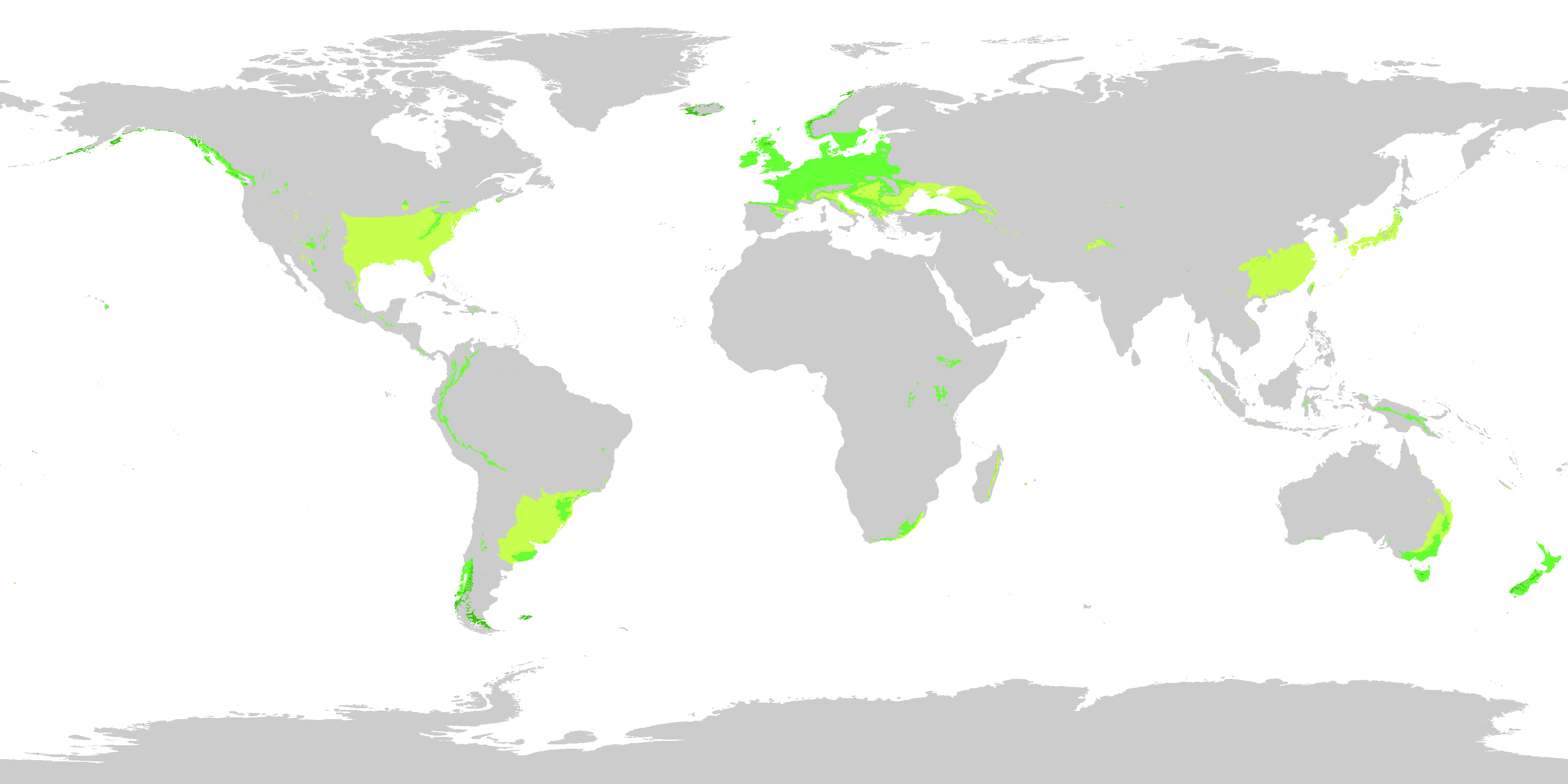
Distribution of the humid temperate climates around the world as of 1991-2020, using a threshold of −3 °C (27 °F) for the coldest month. Cfa Cfb Cfc

The humid temperate climate is a temperate climate sub-type mainly located at mid latitudes. It is characterized by humidity and rain throughout the year from oceanic influence. Although the term humid temperate climate is not used in the Köppen climate classification, this climate type may fall under the Cf classification, which indicates a temperate climate without a dry season.

== Sub-types ==
The Cf climate in Köppen classification has 3 subtypes, classified by temperature. The letter C indicates that the average monthly temperature for the coldest month is above −3 °C (27 °F) and below 18 °C (64 °F).

=== Humid subtropical climate (Cfa) ===
The humid subtropical climate, like other subtropical climates, is characterized by a hot summer, in which the average daily temperature in the warmest month is above 22 °C (72 °F).

=== Oceanic climate (Cfb) ===
The oceanic climate, also known as a marine climate, is characterized by warm summers in which the average daily temperature in the warmest month is below 22 °C (72 °F). In addition, at least 4 months have a mean monthly temperature above 10 °C (50 °F). It is found on continental western coasts.
The typical vegetation in oceanic climates is humid temperate forest.

==== Subtropical highland climate (Cfb, Cwb, Cwc) ====
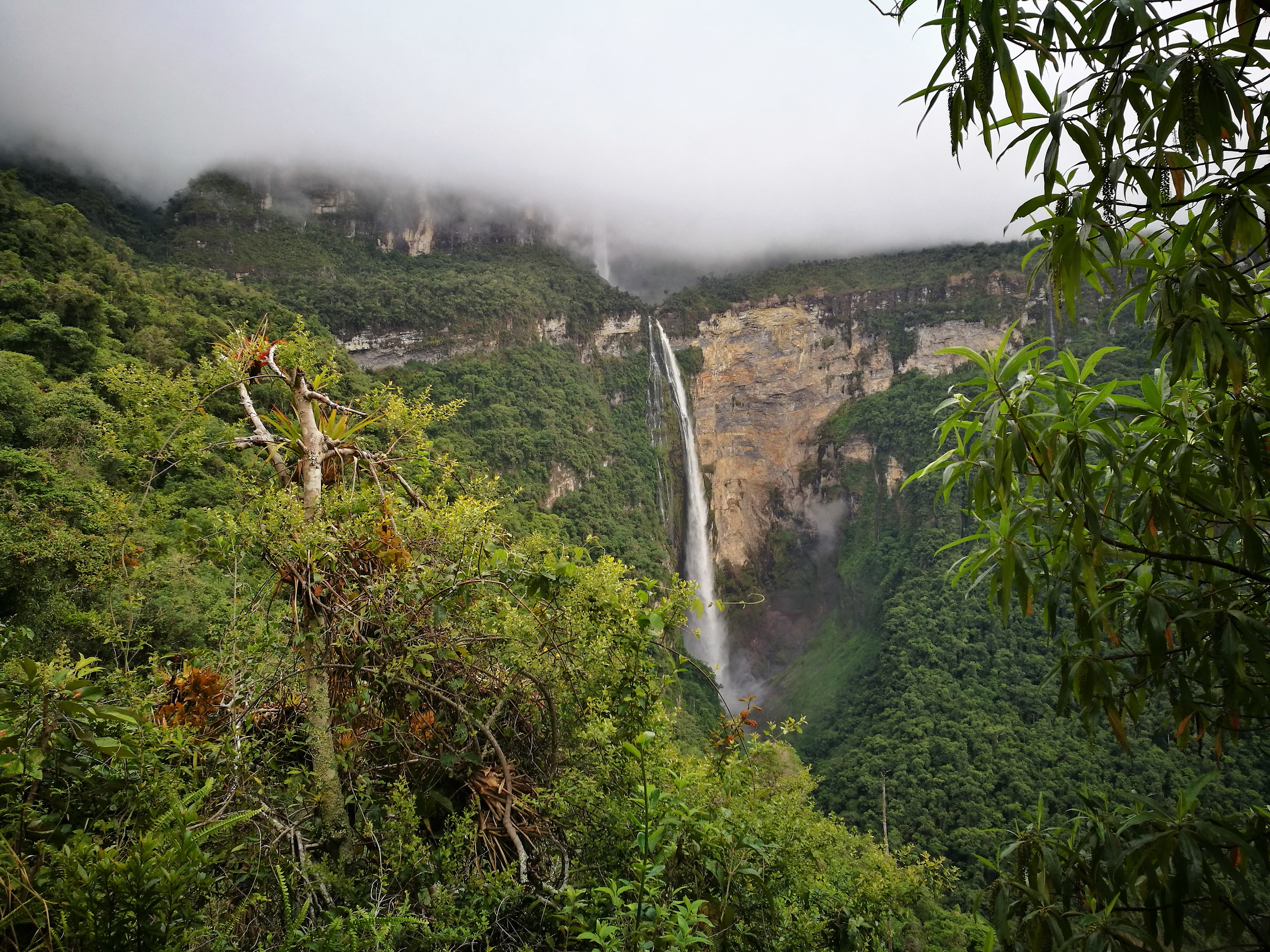
Catarata Gocta (Peru) with subtropical highland climate (Cfb).

The subtropical highland climate is the low-latitude variation of the oceanic climate. This relatively consistent temperature and rainfall is caused by the location of this climate at up to 2500 m altitude. It is mainly found in the highlands of Andes, Central America and New Guinea.

=== Subpolar oceanic climate (Cfc) ===
The subpolar oceanic climate is located in high latitudes, at the border between the oceanic climate and polar climate. This climate has cool and short summers, with 1 to 3 months having a mean monthly temperature above 10 °C (50 °F). The vegetation of subpolar forests.

== See also ==
- Temperate climate
- Humid subtropical climate
- Oceanic climate
- Köppen climate classification
- Temperate zone
