= Dudullu station =

Metro station in Istanbul, Turkey

Dudullu (M5) Dudullu (M8)
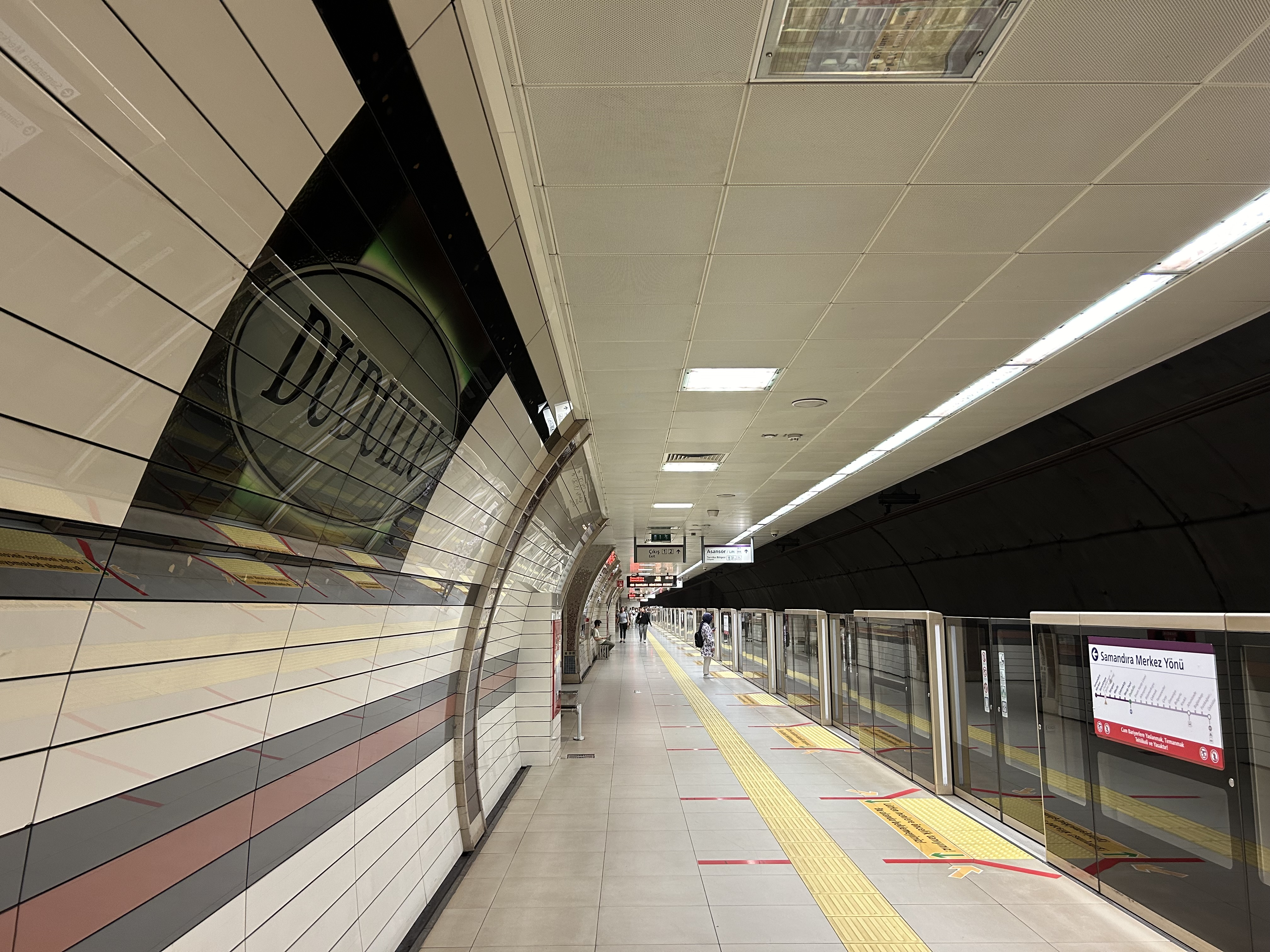
- M5 platform featuring half-height protective gates

General information
- Location: Yukarı Dudullu Neighborhood, Alemdağ Street, 34775; Ümraniye, Istanbul; Turkey
- Coordinates: 41°0′55″N 29°9′48″E
- System: Istanbul Metro rapid transit station
- Owner: Istanbul Metropolitan Municipality
- Operator: Metro Istanbul
- Lines: M5; M8
- Platforms: 2 island platforms (1 for each line)
- Tracks: 4

Construction
- Structure type: Underground
- Parking: 81 spaces
- Cycle facilities: Yes
- Accessible: Yes

History
- Opened: M5: 21 October 2018 (7 years ago); M8: 6 January 2023 (3 years ago)
- Electrified: 1,500 V DC Overhead line

Services
Preceding station	Istanbul Metro	Following station
İmam Hatip Lisesi towards Üsküdar	M5 Line	Necip Fazıl towards Sultanbeyli
MODOKO–KEYAP towards Bostancı	M8 Line	Huzur towards Parseller
Location

Dudullu is an underground station on the M5 and M8 lines of the Istanbul Metro in Ümraniye. The station is located under Alemdağ Street in the Yukarı Dudullu neighborhood of Ümraniye. Connection to IETT city buses is available at street level.

Both M5 and M8 lines operate as fully automatic unattended train operation (UTO). Both stations consist of an island platform with two tracks. Since the M5 and M8 are ATO lines, protective gates on each side of the platform open only when a train is in the station on M5, and full height doors are used for M8.

The platform of the M8 line is under the platform of the M5 line.

The M5 portion of the station was opened on 21 October 2018, with the M8 portion opening on 6 January 2023.

== Station layout ==
The station has 2 exits. There are 3 elevators and 18 escalators.

Platform level	Westbound	← toward Üsküdar (İmam Hatip Lisesi)
Platform level	Island platform, doors will open on the left
Platform level	Eastbound	toward Sultanbeyli (Necip Fazıl) →

Platform level	Southbound	← toward Bostancı (MODOKO–KEYAP)
Platform level	Island platform, doors will open on the left
Platform level	Northbound	toward Parseller (Huzur) →

== Operation information ==
=== M5 ===
The M5 line operates between 06:00 and 00:00 with a train frequency of 4 minutes and 40 seconds during peak hours and 7 minutes at all other times. The line also operates night metro services between 00:00 and 06:00 on Saturdays and Sundays, with trains running every 30 minutes. This provides 66 hours of uninterrupted service between Friday and Sunday. During these hours, fares are charged at double the price. During this time, only Entrance 1 is open at this station.

=== M8 ===
The M8 line operates between 06:00 and 23:00 and train frequency is 8 minutes and 40 seconds. The line has no night service.

== Gallery ==
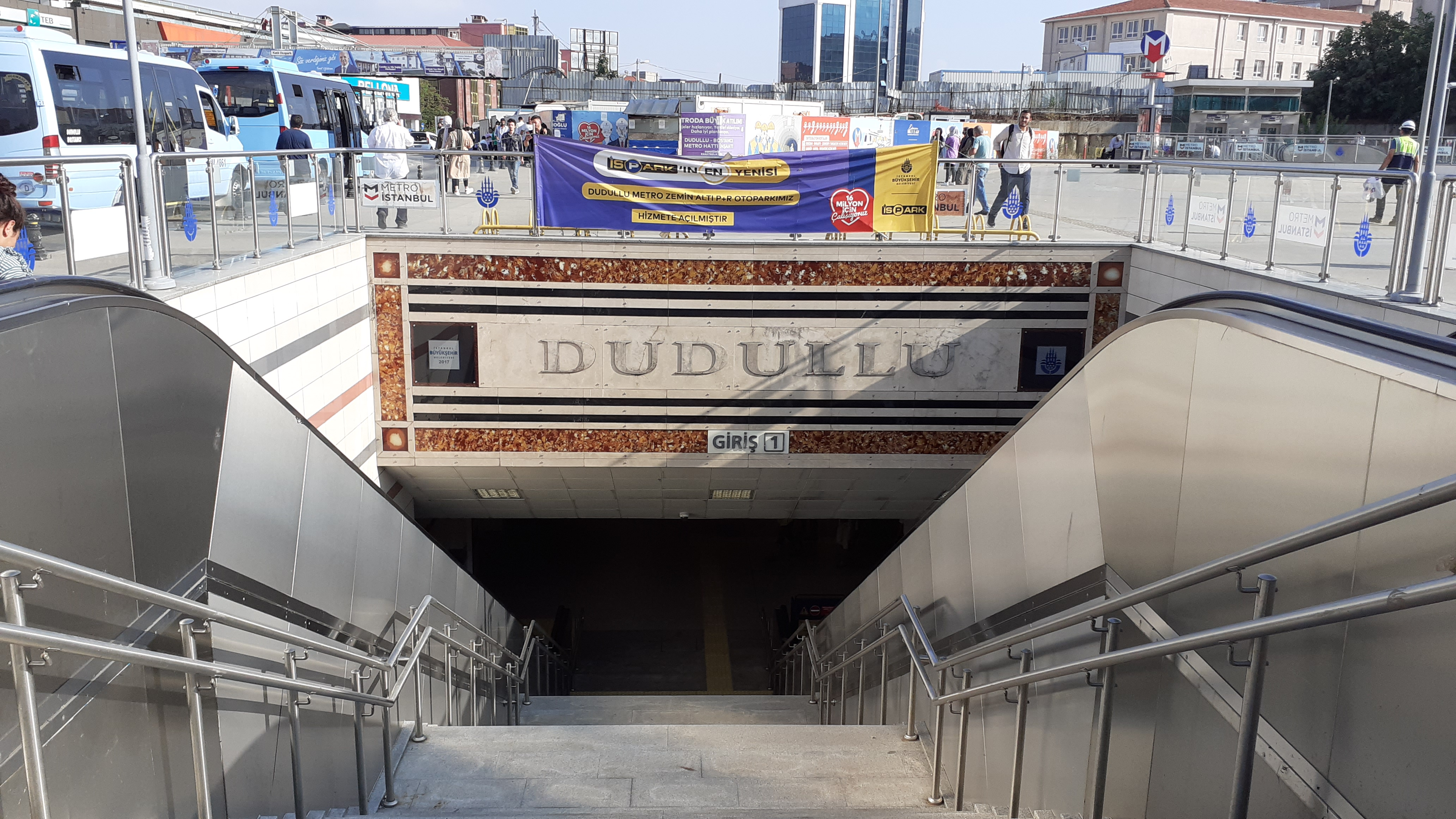
Entrance 1

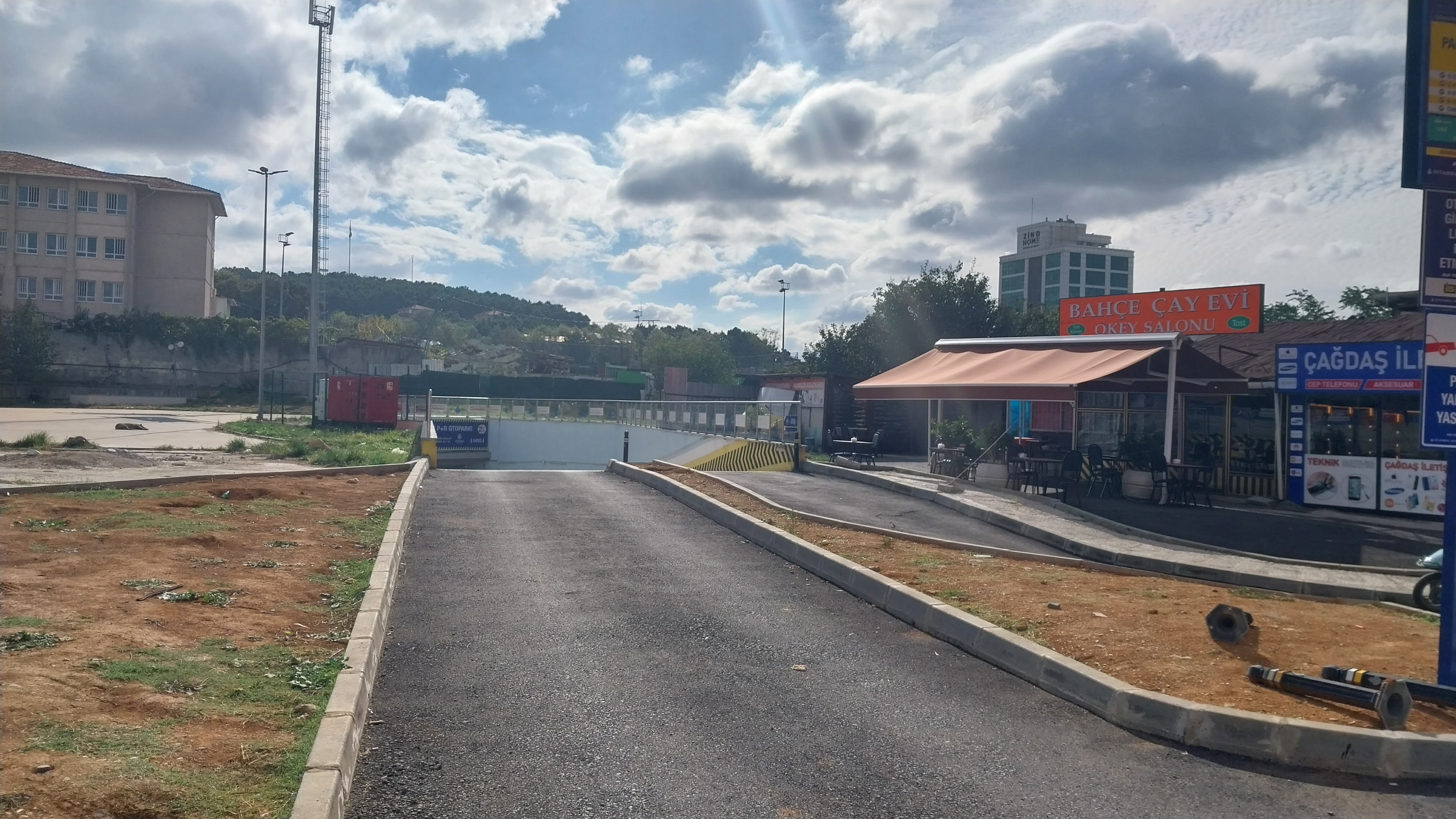
Parking

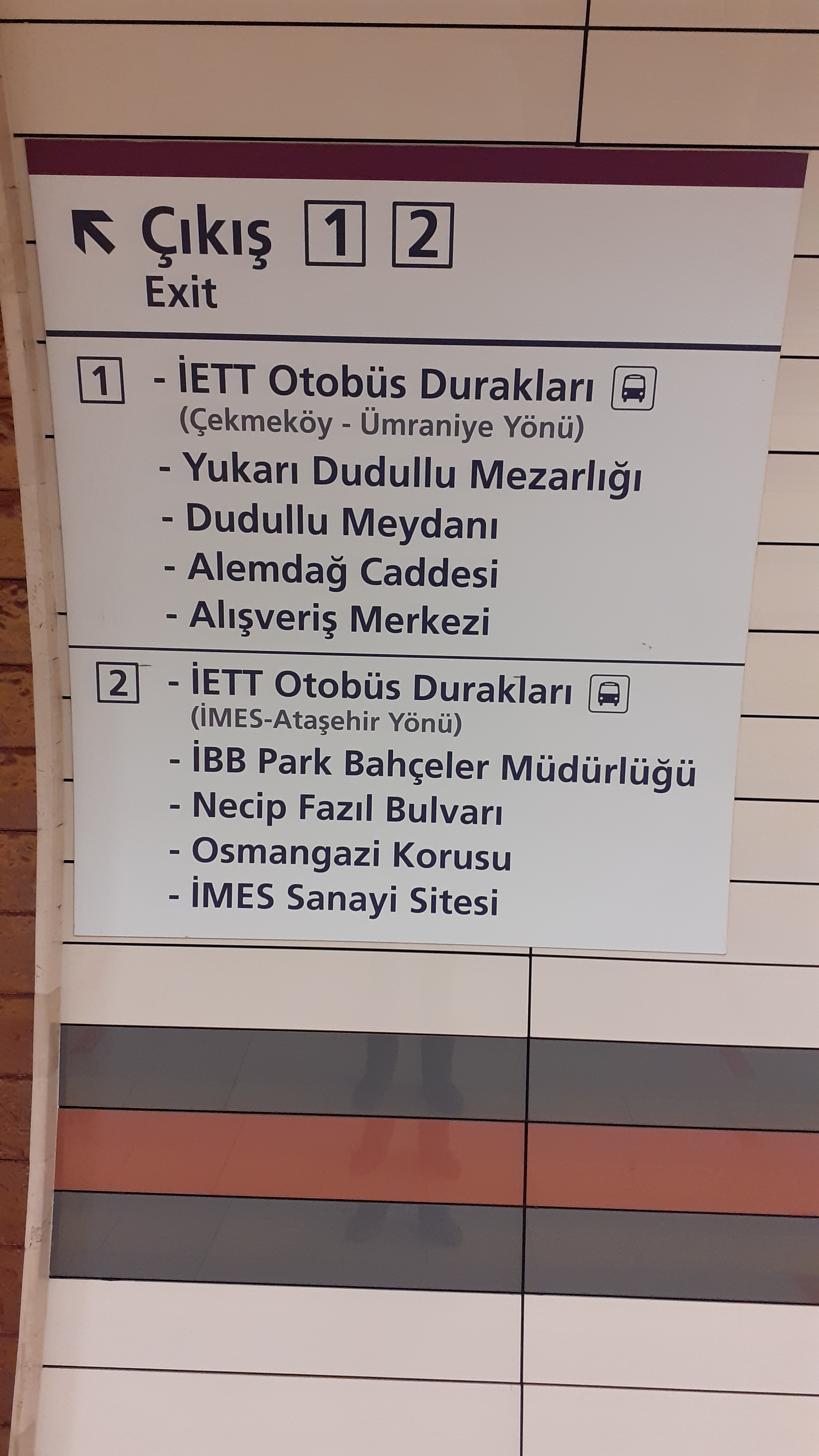
Exit list in 2018

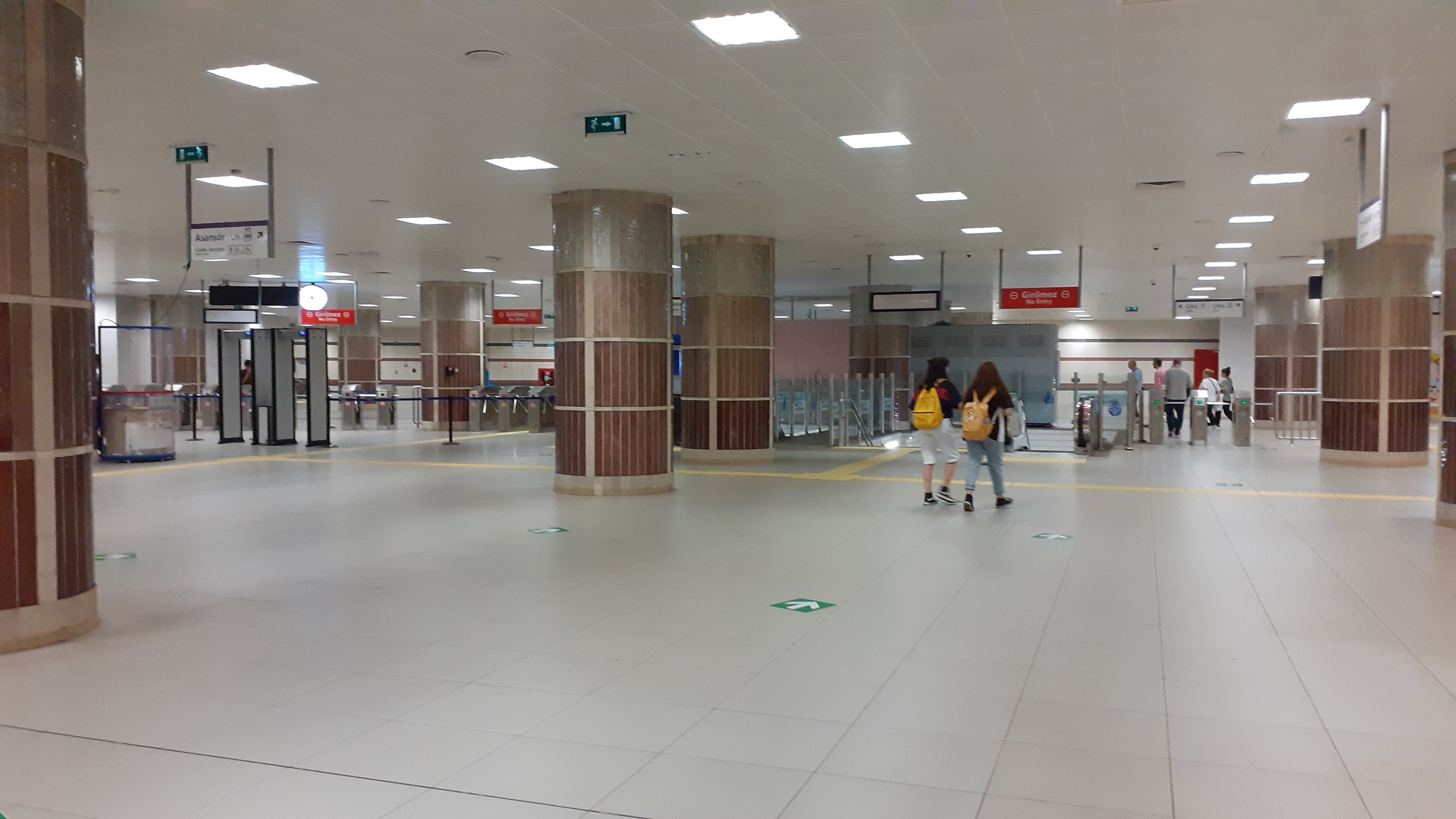
M5 ticket hall

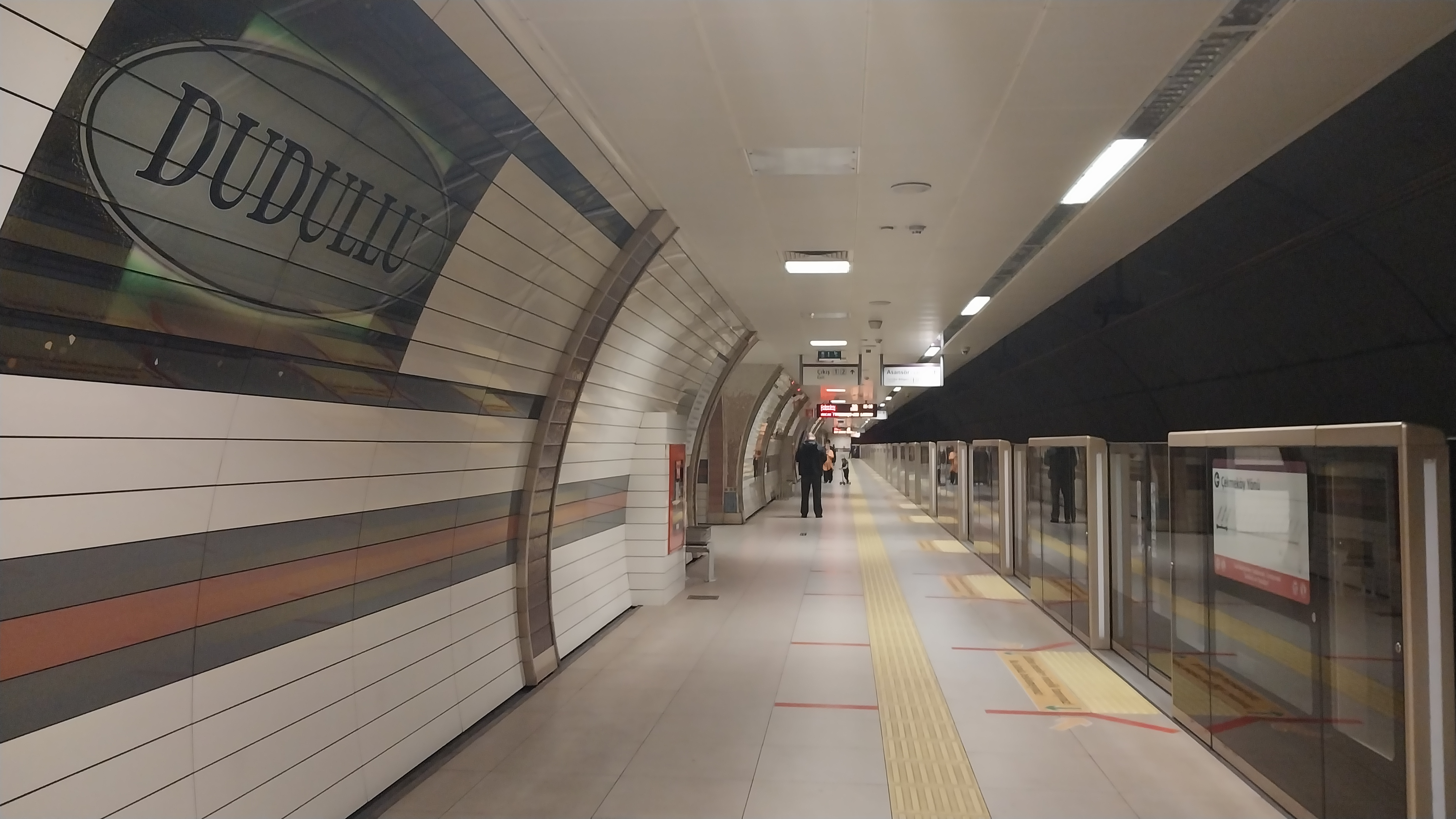
M5 platform

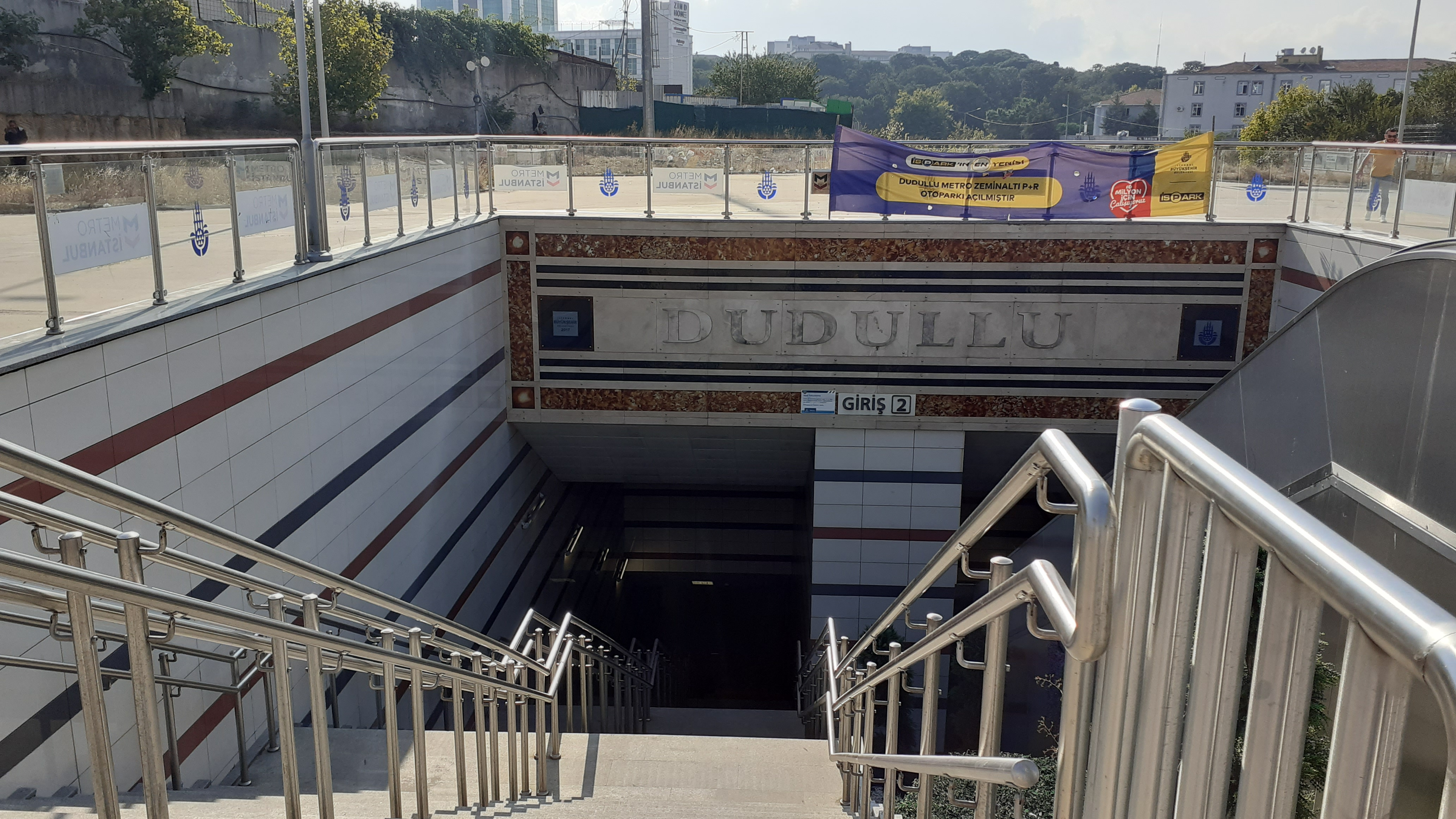
Entrance 2

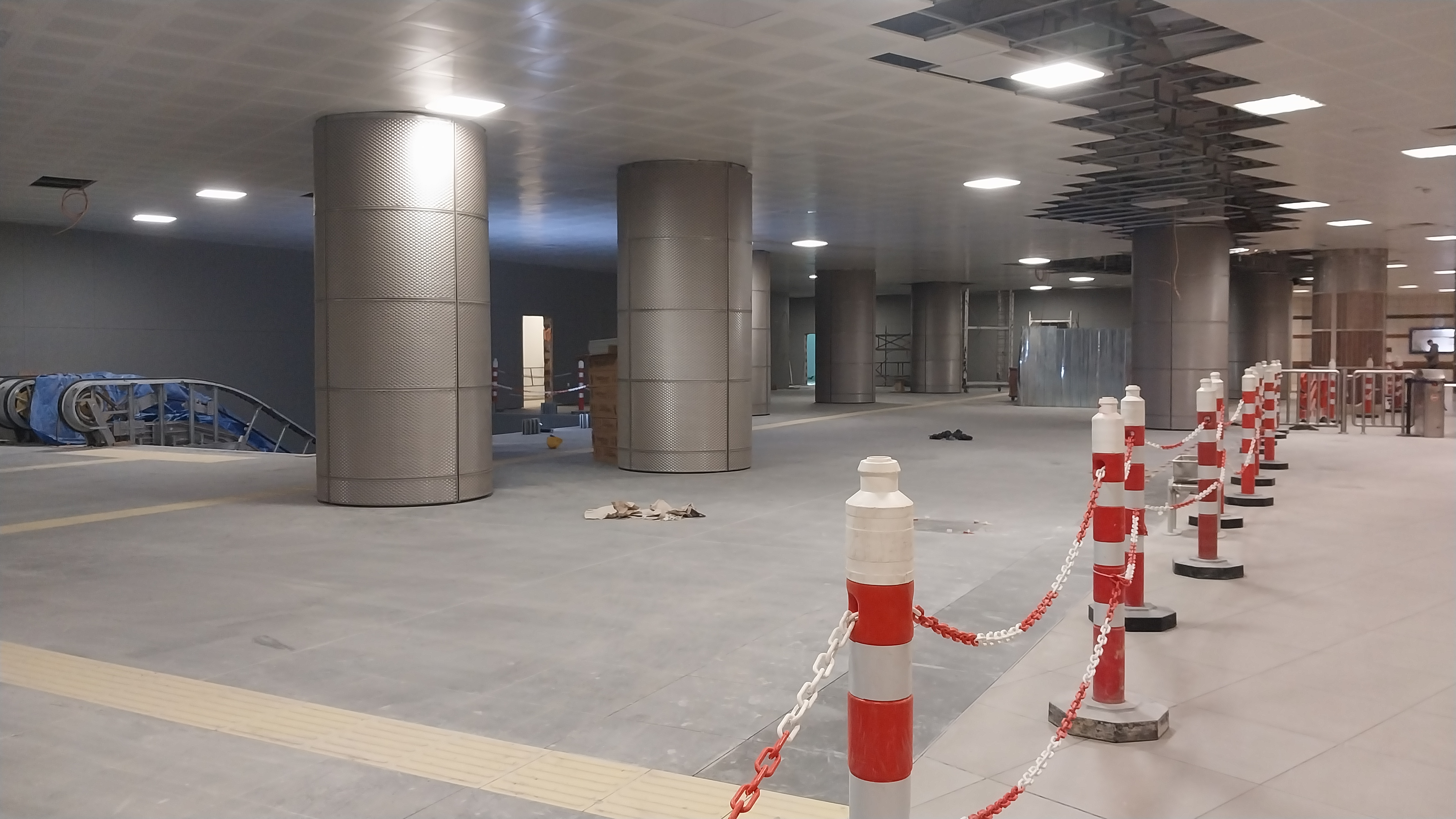
M8 ticket hall construction (December 2022)

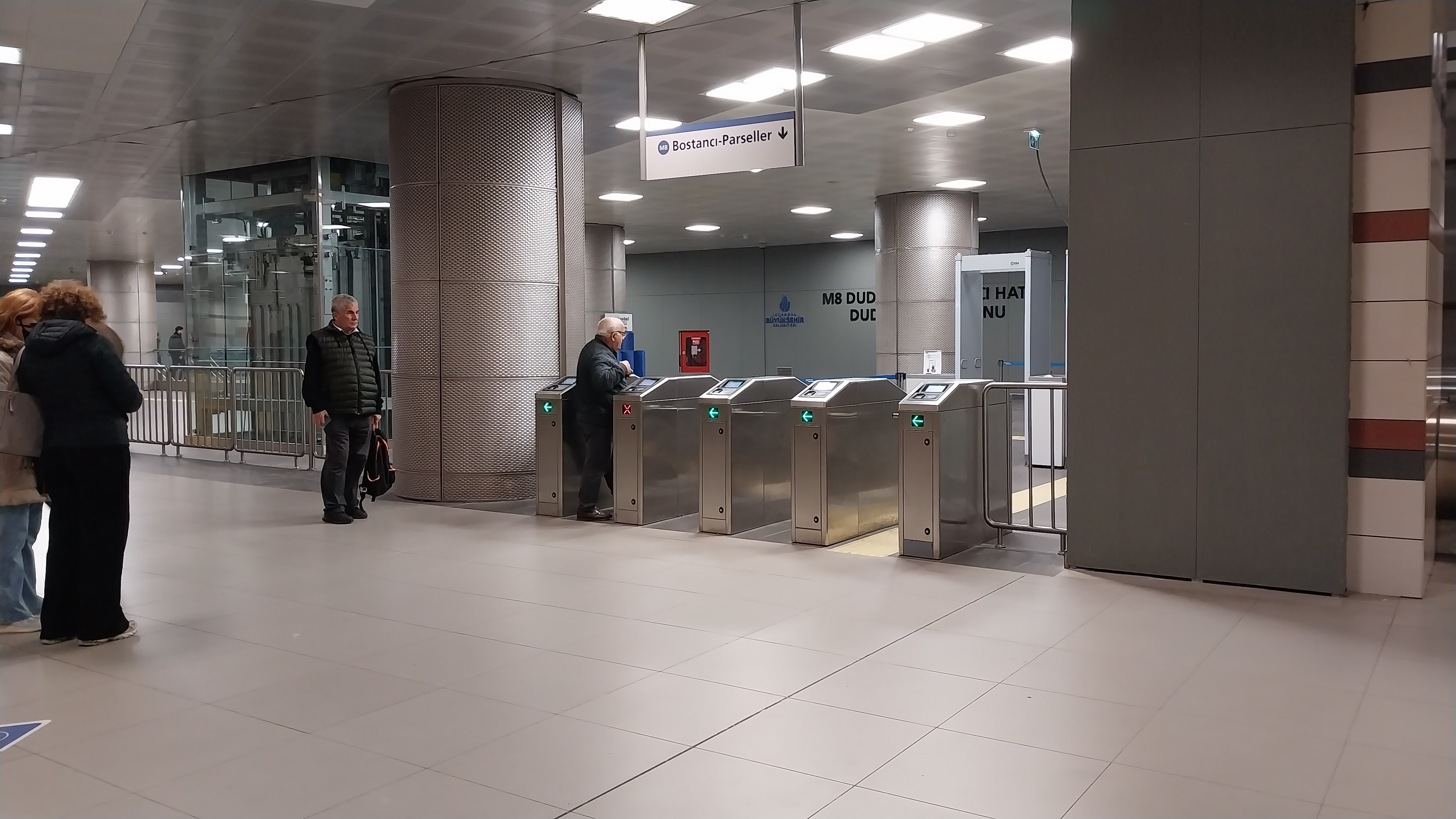
M8 ticket hall

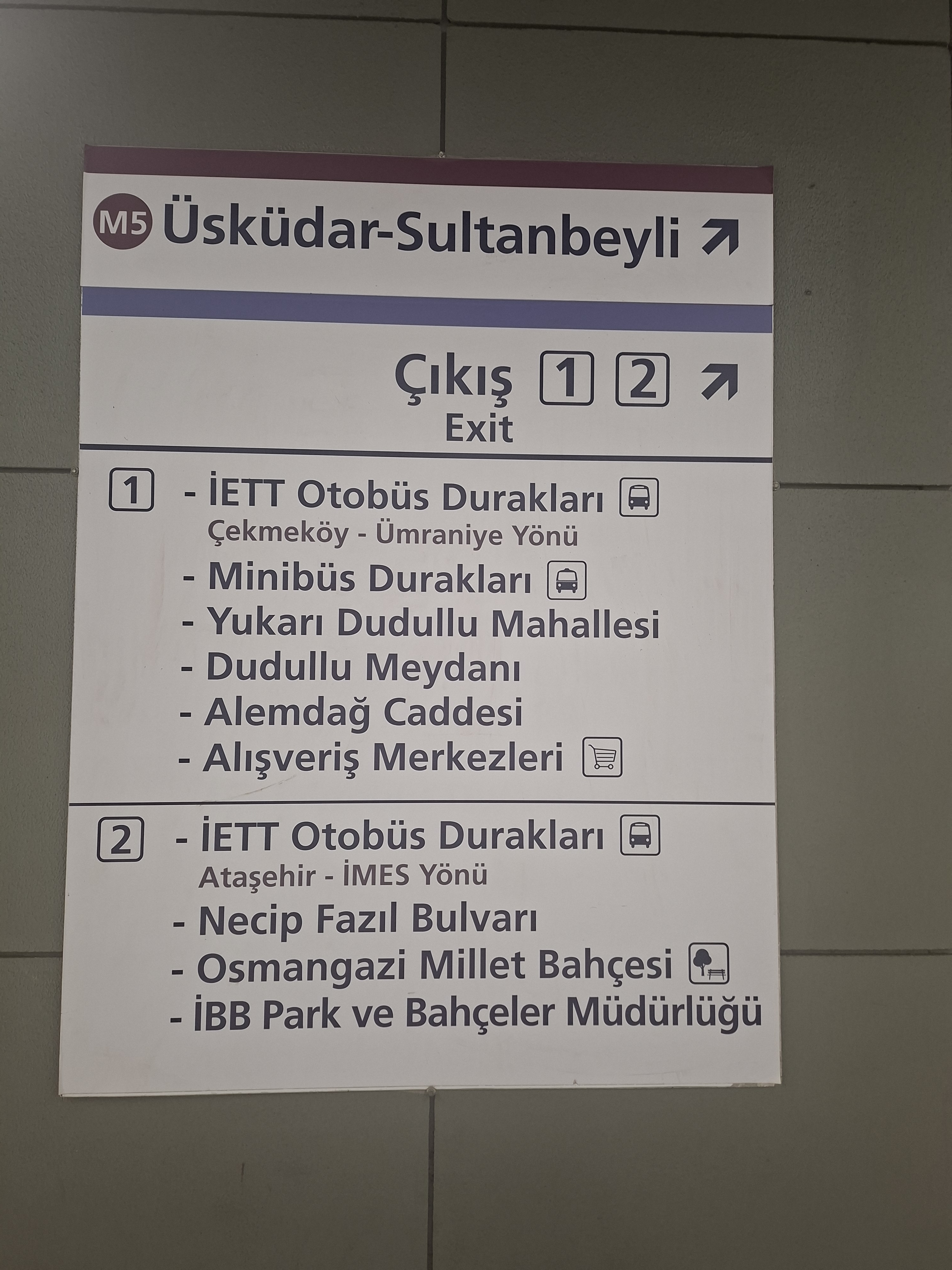
Exit list and interchange sign

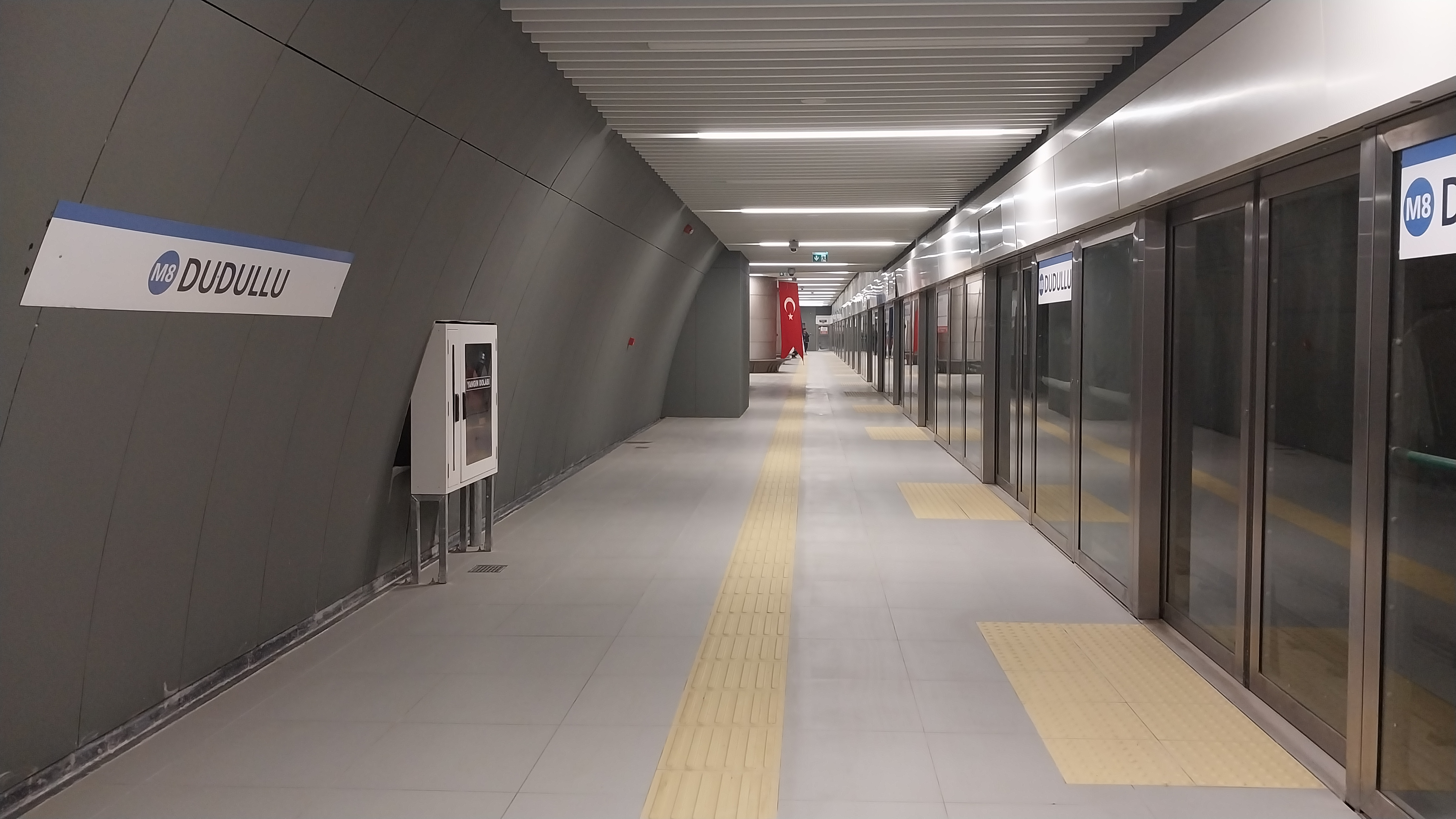
M8 platform featuring full-height doors

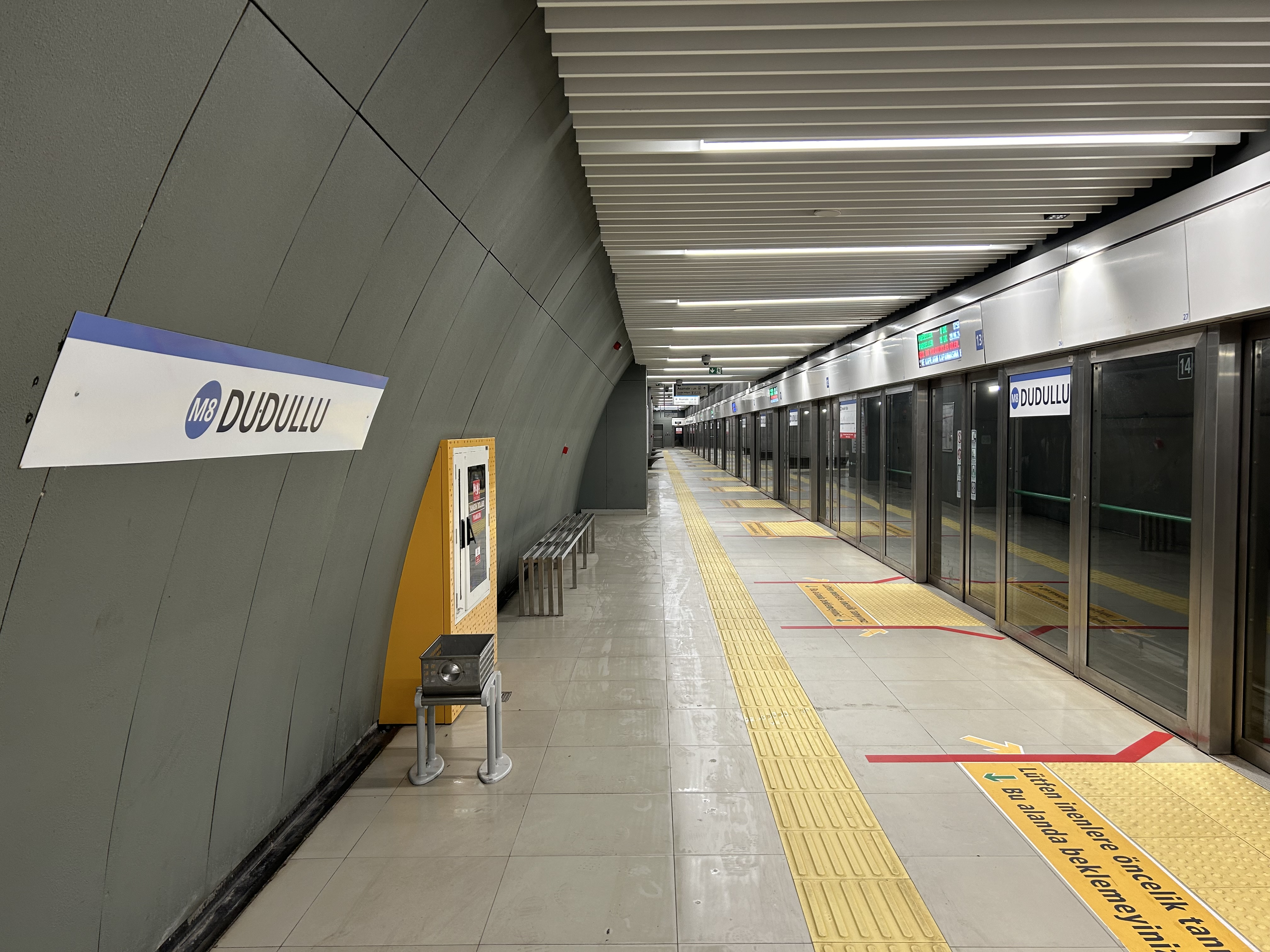
M8 platform alternate view
