= MODOKO–KEYAP =

Station of the Istanbul Metro

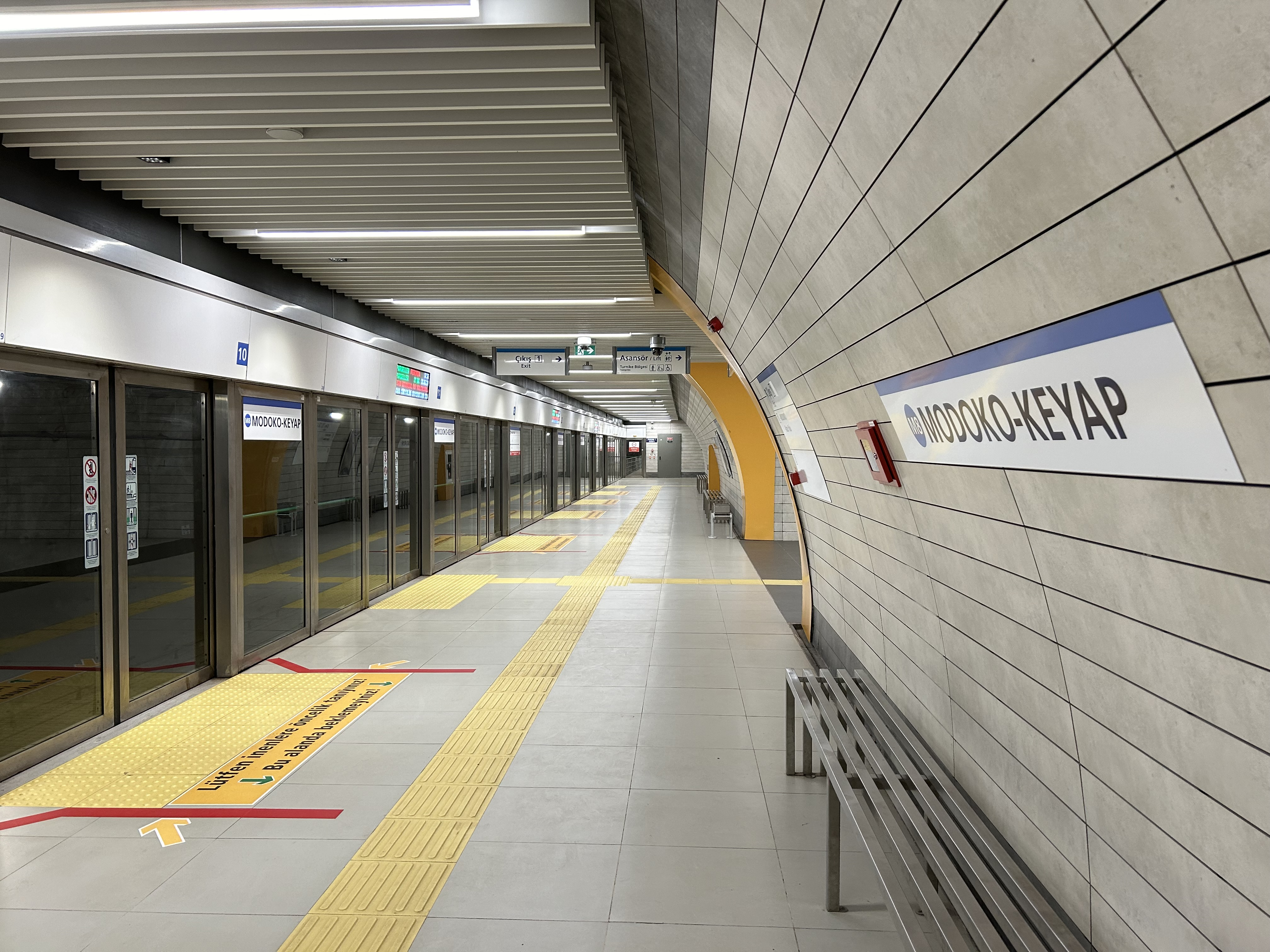
- Platform

General information
- Location: Esenşehir Neighborhood, Necip Fazıl Boulevard / Nato Yolu Street, 34775; Ümraniye, Istanbul; Turkey
- Coordinates: 41°0′27″N 29°9′43″E
- System: Istanbul Metro rapid transit station
- Owner: Istanbul Metropolitan Municipality
- Operator: Istanbul Metro
- Line: M8
- Platforms: 1 Island platform
- Tracks: 2
- Connections: İETT Bus: 11P, 14A, 14AK, 14CE, 14ES, 14S, 14T, 14TM, 14YE, 14ÇK, 14ŞB, 15SD, 19D, 19E, 19EK, 19ES, 19S, 19SB, 19V, 20D, 131T, 131YS, 320, UM74; Istanbul Minibus: Üsküdar - Alemdağ, Bostancı - Dudullu, Bostancı - Kayşıdağı - Dudullu, Bostancı - Tavukçu Yolu - Dudullu, Bostancı - Ferhatpaşa - Dudullu

Construction
- Structure type: Underground
- Parking: No
- Cycle facilities: Yes
- Accessible: Yes

History
- Opened: 6 January 2023 (3 years ago)
- Electrified: 1,500 V DC Overhead line

Services
Preceding station	Istanbul Metro	Following station
İMES towards Bostancı	M8 Line	Dudullu towards Parseller
Location

MODOKO–KEYAP is an underground station on the M8 line of the Istanbul Metro. It is located under the intersection of Necip Fazıl Boulevard and Nato Yolu Street in the Esenşehir neighborhood of Ümraniye. It was opened on 6 January 2023.

== Station layout ==
Platform level	Southbound	← toward Bostancı (İMES)
Platform level	Island platform, doors will open on the left
Platform level	Northbound	toward Parseller (Dudullu) →

== Operation information ==
The line operates between 06:00 and 23:00 and train frequency is 8 minutes and 40 seconds. The line has no night service.

== Gallery ==
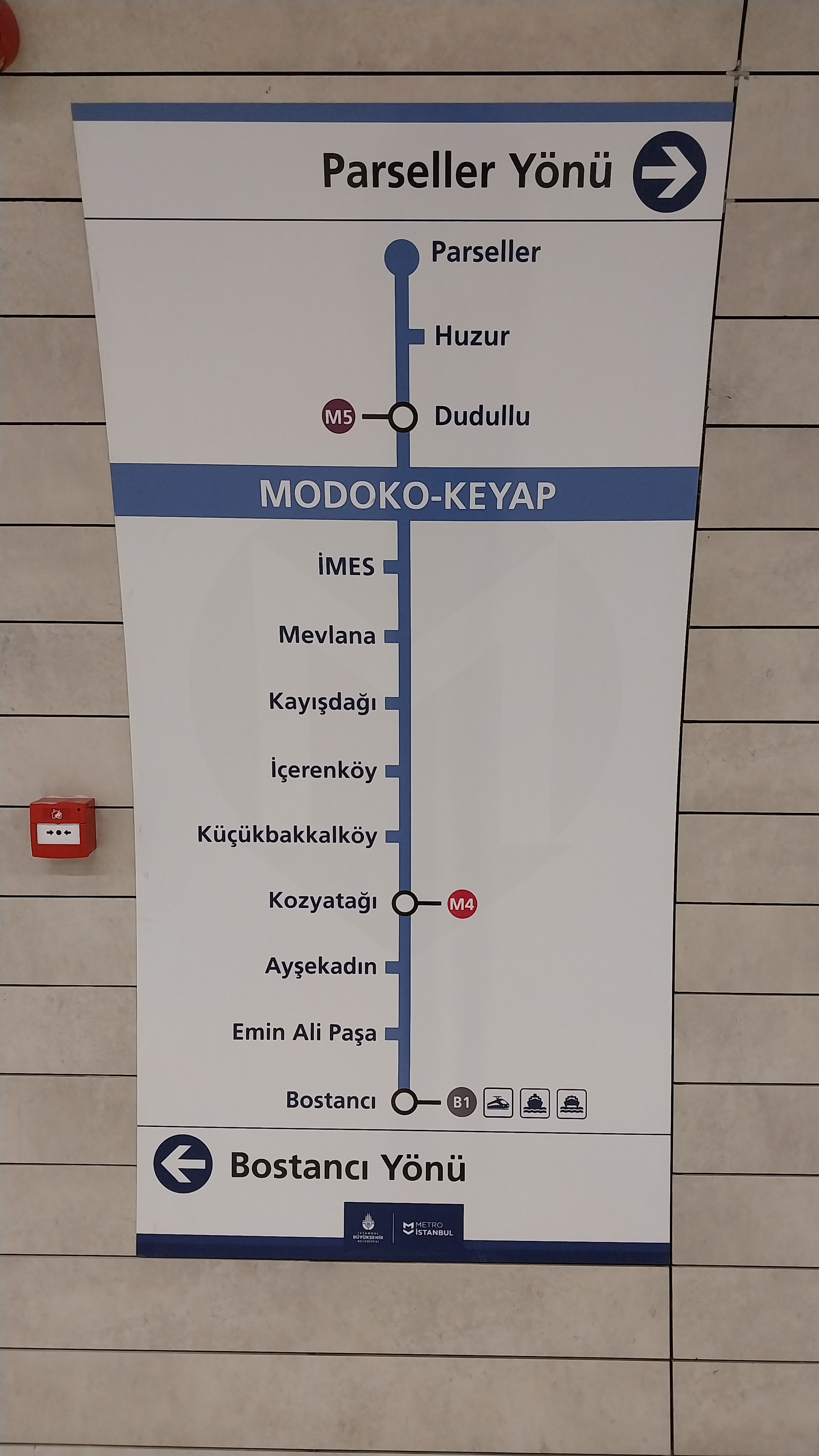
Route diagram

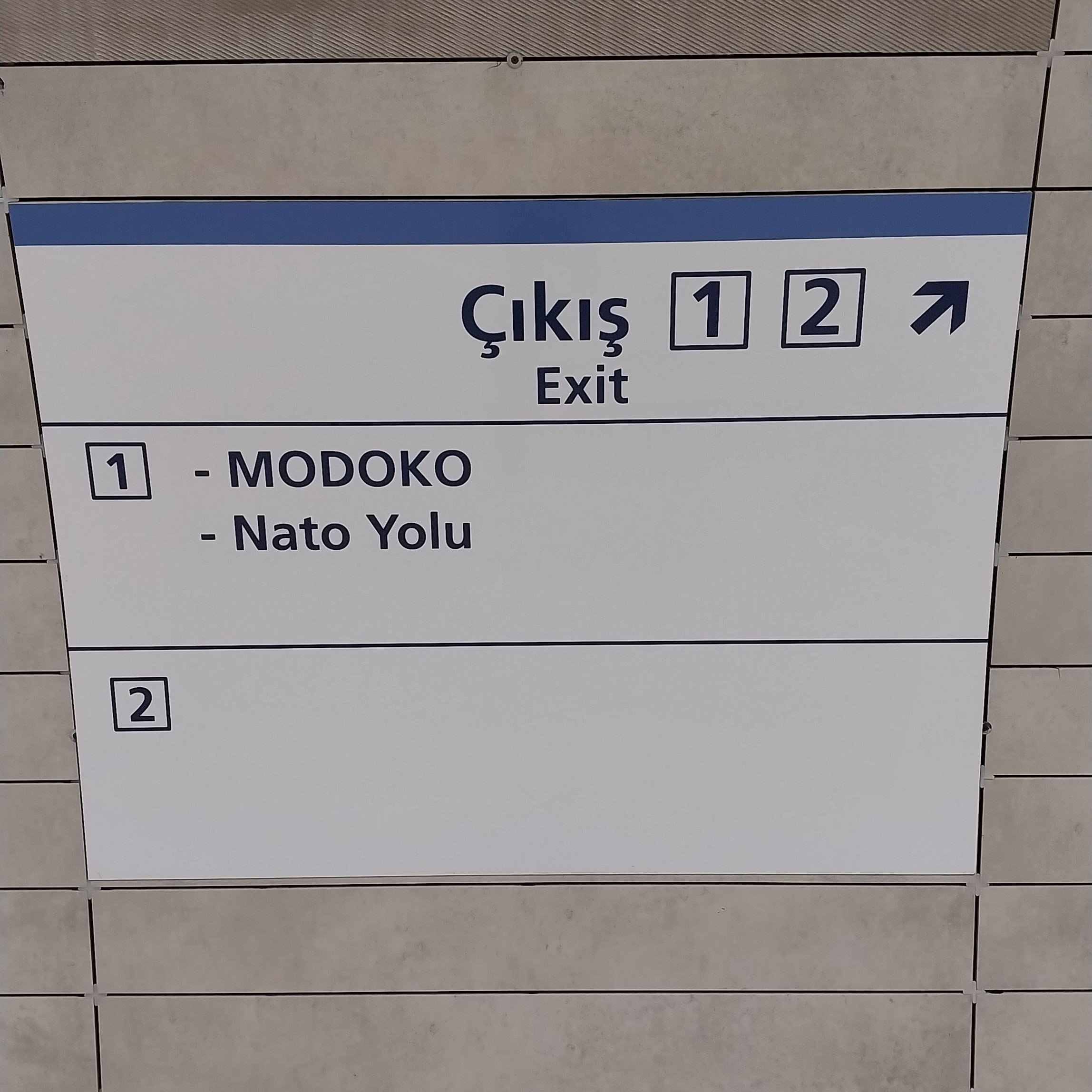
Exit list

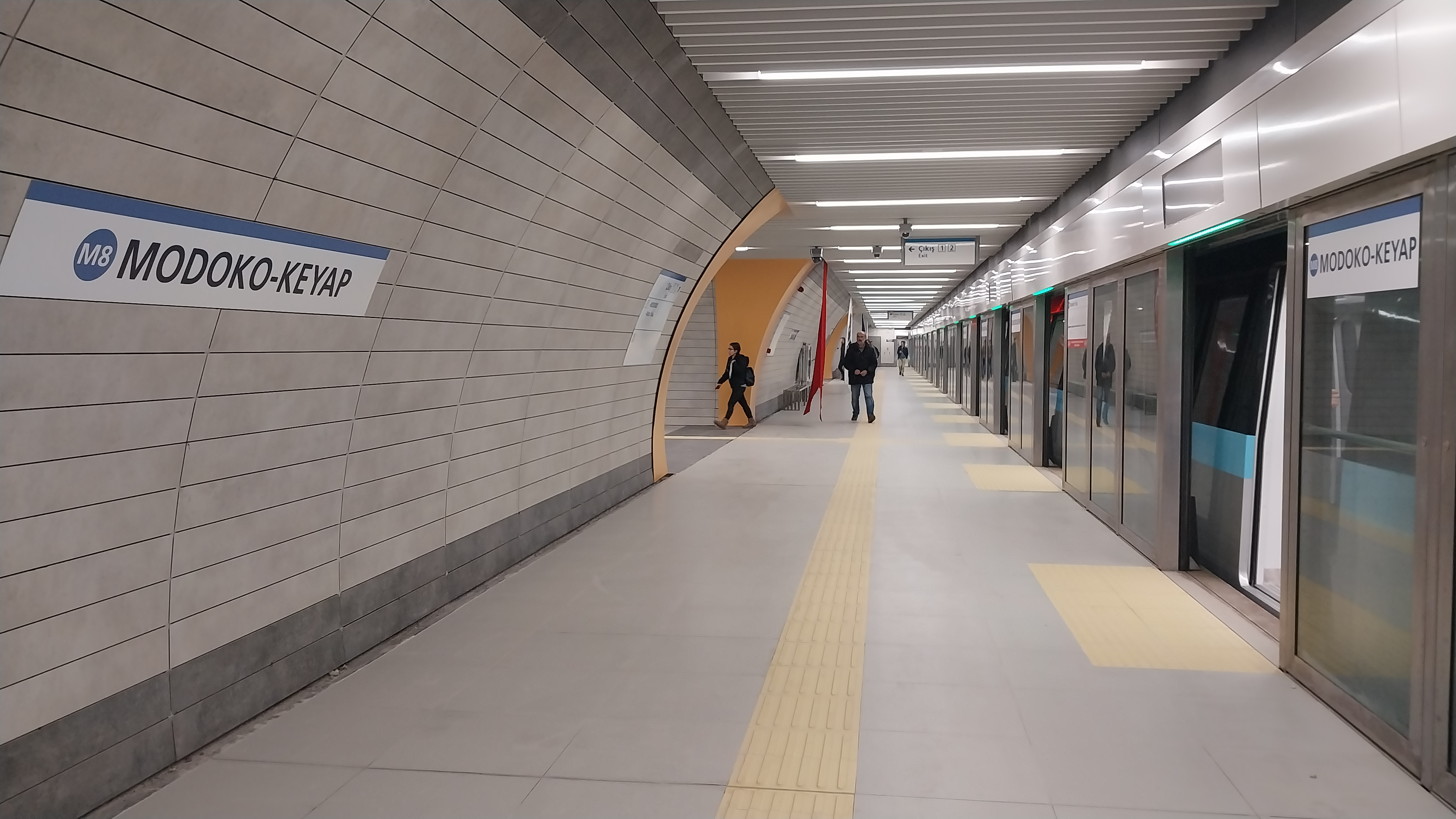
Platform
