= İMES station =

Station of the Istanbul Metro

İMES
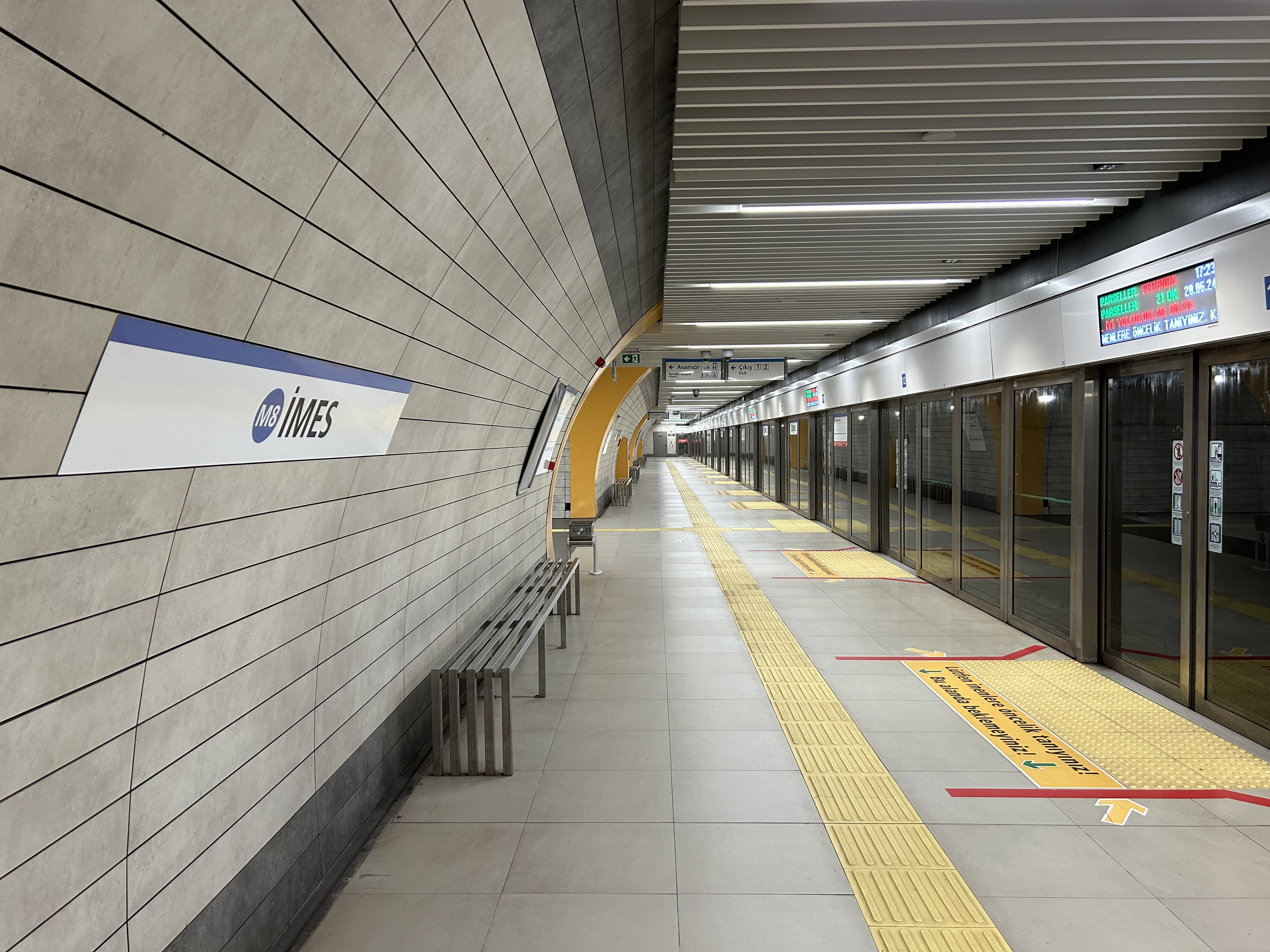
- Platform

General information
- Location: Esenşehir Neighborhood, Necip Fazıl Boulevard, İMES East Gate, 34775; Ümraniye, Istanbul; Turkey
- Coordinates: 41°0′1″N 29°9′22″E
- System: Istanbul Metro rapid transit station
- Owner: Istanbul Metropolitan Municipality
- Operator: Istanbul Metro
- Line: M8
- Platforms: 1 Island platform
- Tracks: 2
- Connections: İETT Bus: 14A, 14AK, 14CE, 14S, 14T, 14TM, 14ÇK, 14ŞB, 19D, 19E, 19EK, 19ES, 19S, 19SB, 19V, 320; Istanbul Minibus: Bostancı - Kayışdağı - Dudullu, Bostancı - Tavukçu Yolu - Dudullu

Construction
- Structure type: Underground
- Parking: No
- Cycle facilities: Yes
- Accessible: Yes

History
- Opened: 6 January 2023 (3 years ago)
- Electrified: 1,500 V DC Overhead line

Services
Preceding station	Istanbul Metro	Following station
Mevlana towards Bostancı	M8 Line	MODOKO–KEYAP towards Parseller
Location

İMES is an underground station on the M8 line of the Istanbul Metro. It is located under Necip Fazıl Boulevard at the İMES East Gate in the Esenşehir neighborhood of Ümraniye. It was opened on 6 January 2023.

== Station layout ==
Platform level	Southbound	← toward Bostancı (Mevlana)
Platform level	Island platform, doors will open on the left
Platform level	Northbound	toward Parseller (MODOKO–KEYAP) →

== Operation information ==
The line operates between 06:00 and 23:00 and train frequency is 8 minutes and 40 seconds. The line has no night service.

== Gallery ==
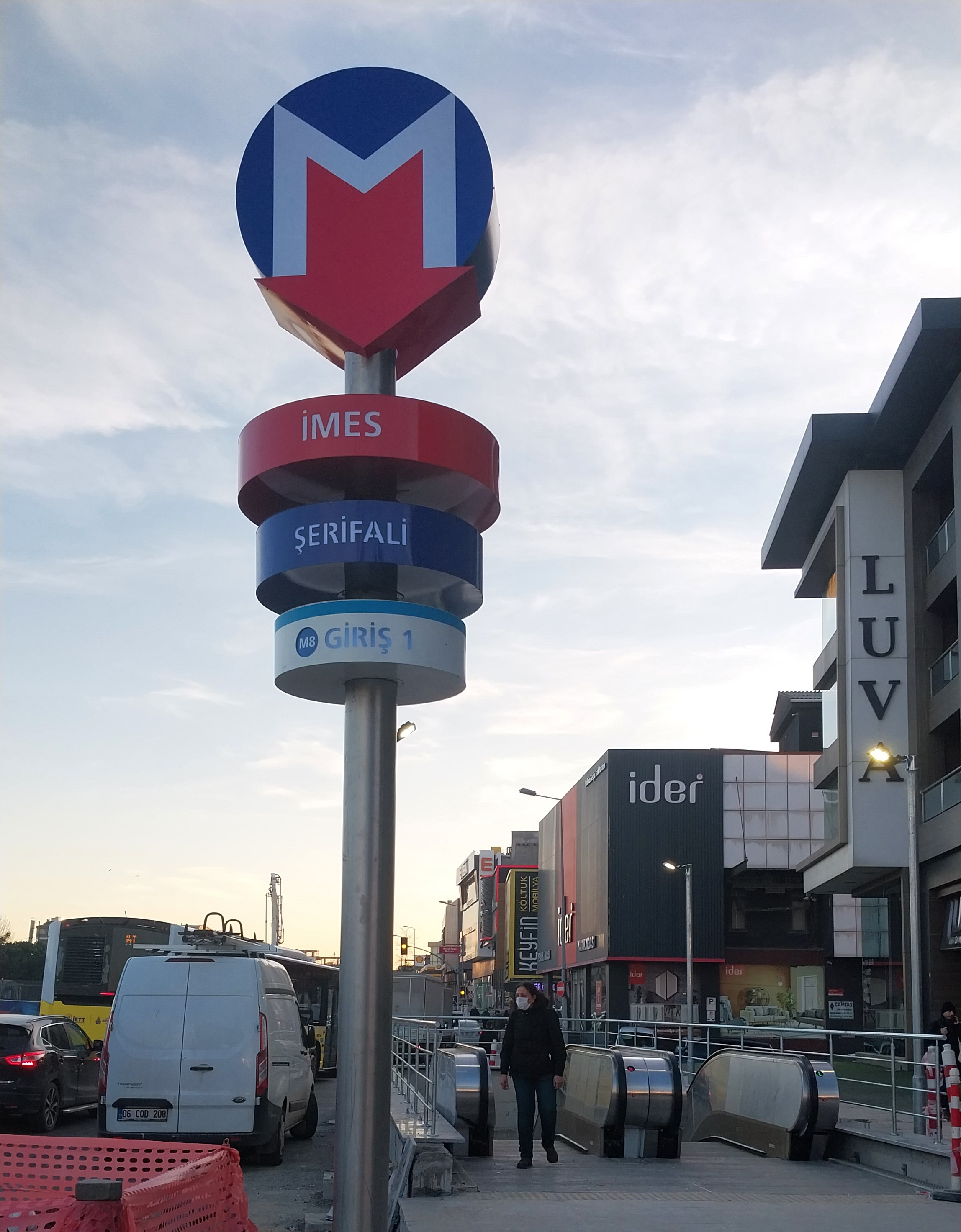
Totem pole

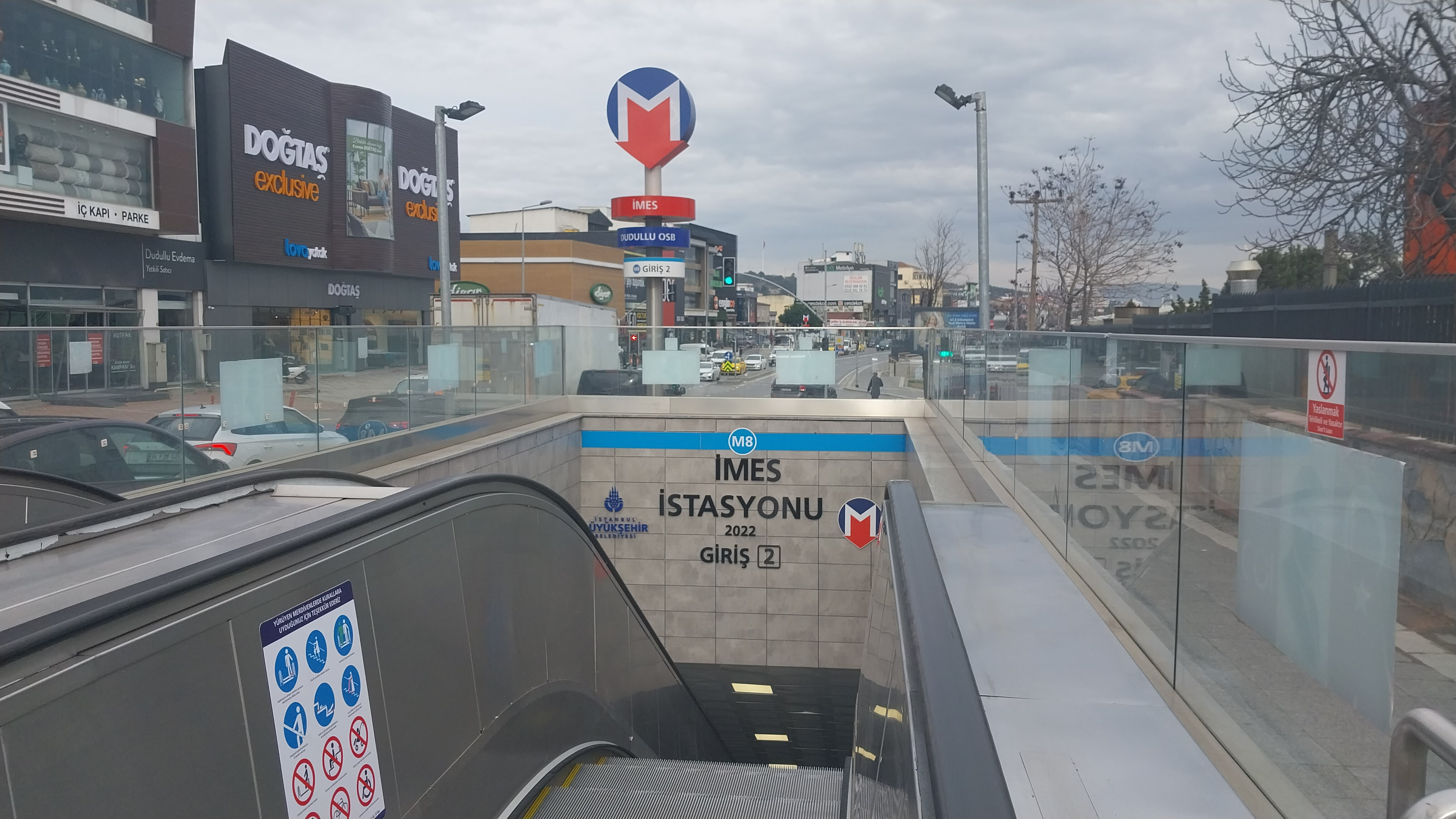
Entrance 2

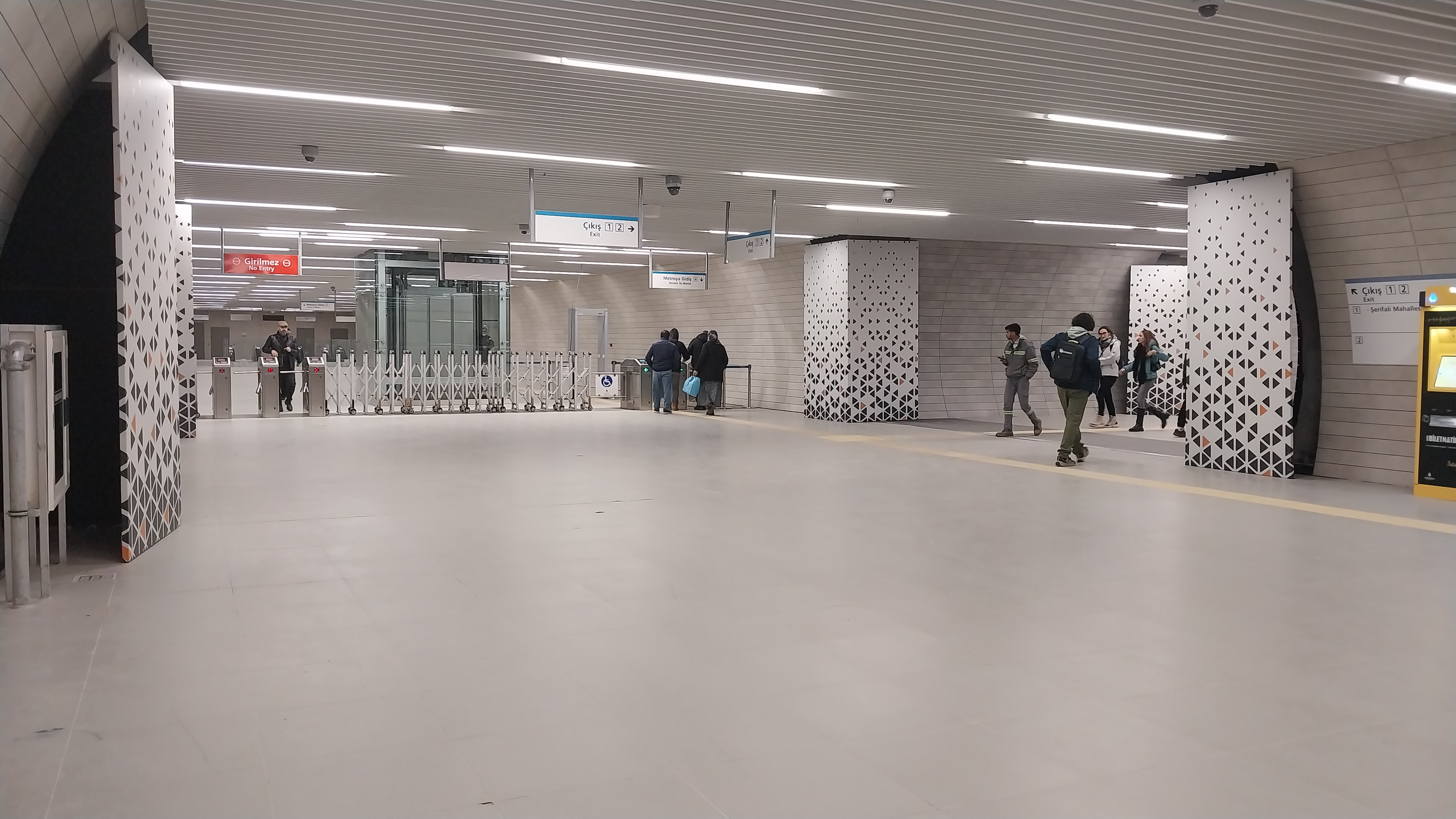
Ticket hall

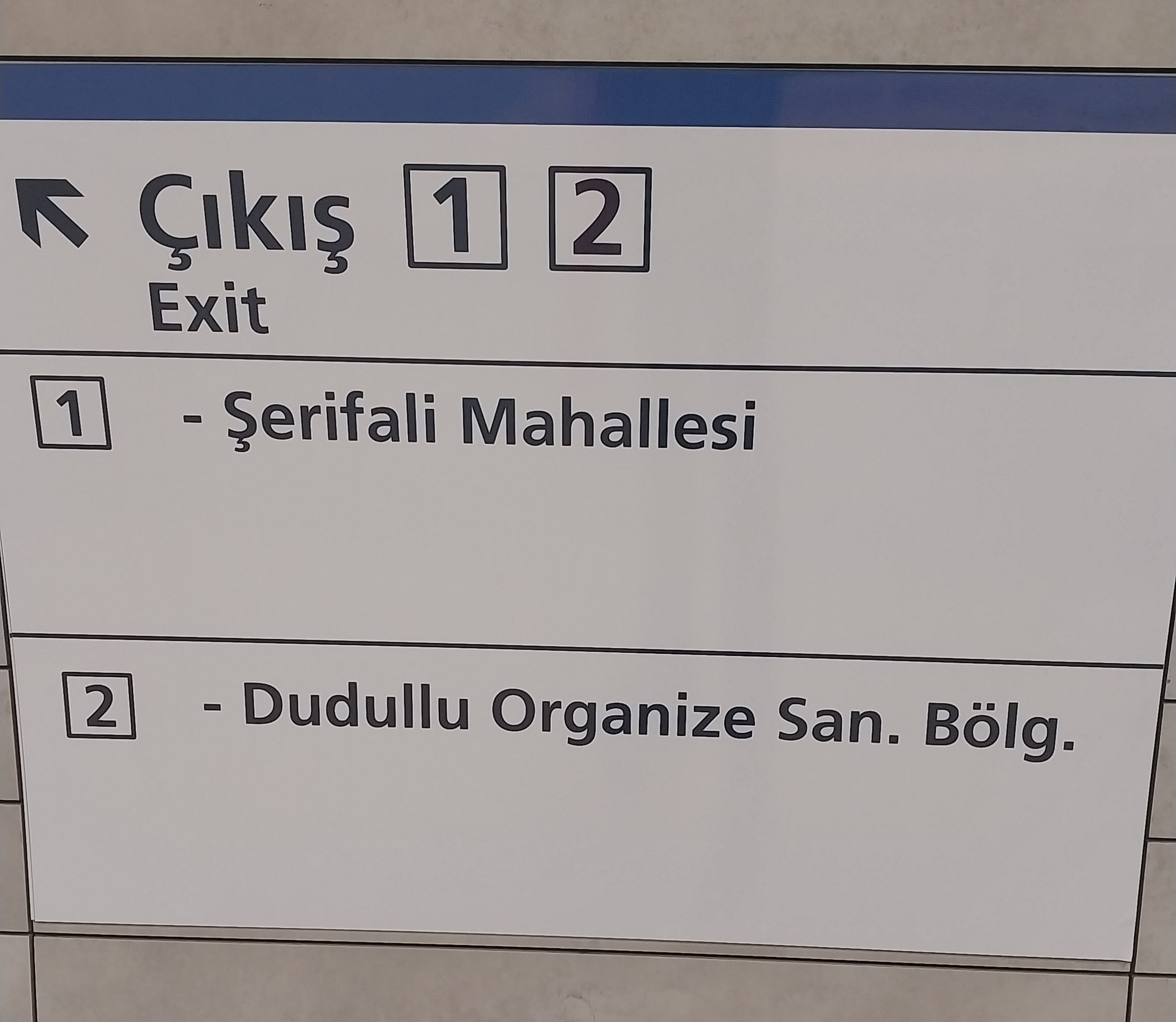
Exit list

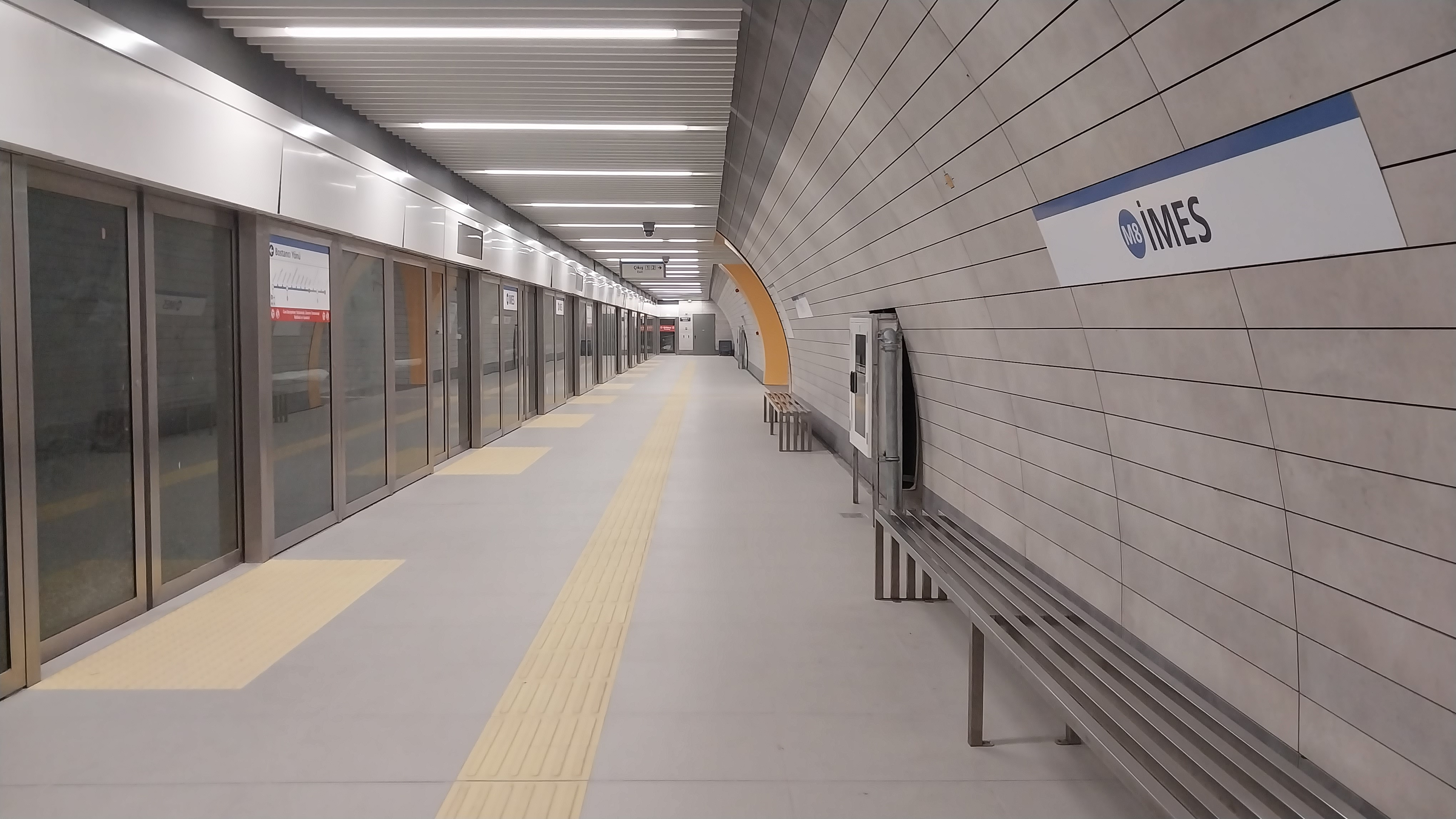
Platform
