= M8 (Istanbul Metro) =

M8 Bostancı–Parseller
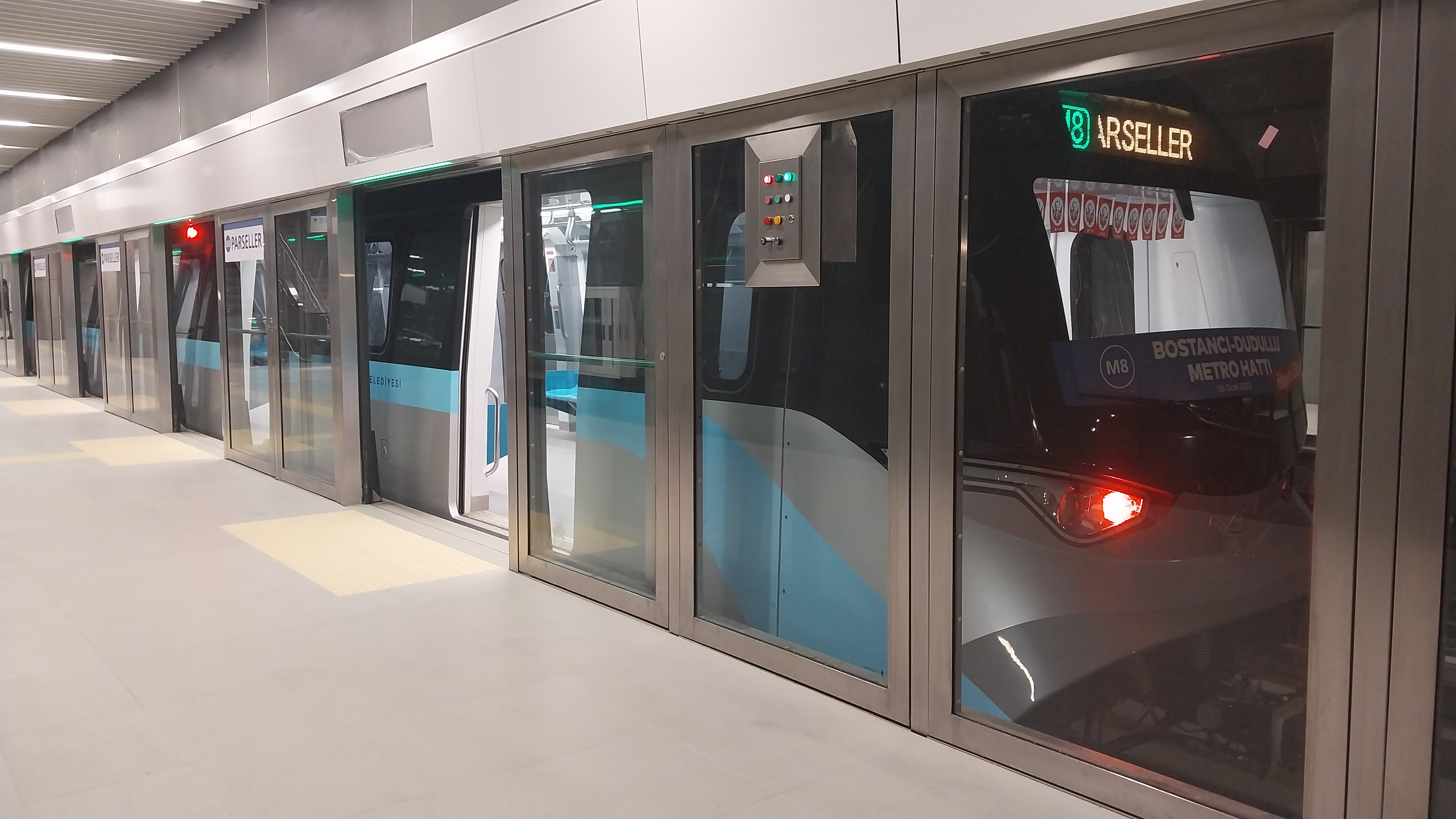

Overview
- Status: Operational
- Owner: Istanbul Metropolitan Municipality
- Line number: M8
- Locale: Istanbul, Turkey
- Termini: Bostancı; Parseller
- Stations: 13
- Website: M8

Service
- Type: Rapid transit
- System: Istanbul Metro
- Services: 1
- Operator: Metro Istanbul A.Ş.
- Depot: Parseller
- Rolling stock: 10 Hyundai Rotem; 4 carriages per trainset

History
- Opened: 6 January 2023 (3 years ago)

Technical
- Line length: 14.27 km (8.87 mi)
- Number of tracks: 2
- Track gauge: 1,435 mm (4 ft 8 1/2 in) standard gauge
- Electrification: 1,500 V DC Overhead line
- Operating speed: 80 km/h (50 mph)

Line M8, officially referred to as the M8 Bostancı-Parseller line, is a rapid transit line of the Istanbul Metro. The line connects Bostancı railway station, on the southern coast of the Anatolian side, to Parseller, in the district of Ümraniye. At Bostancı, connections are available with intercity trains to destinations in Anatolia, as well as the Marmaray service across the Bosphorus.

The line is 14.27 kilometres (8.87 mi) long with 13 stations. It opened for service on 6 January 2023.

It is a fully automatic driverless metro line; all stations have platform screen doors and are completely underground.

== Stations ==
M8 route diagram

No	Station	District	Transfer	Type	Notes
1	Bostancı	Maltepe	・ (Bostancı railway station)・ (Bostancı Pier); İETT Bus: 2, 4, 10B, 16, 16D, 17, 17L, 19FB, 222, 252, E-9,	Underground	Bostancı Ferry Terminal・Bostancı Lunapark
2	Emin Ali Paşa	Kadıköy	İETT Bus: 2, 17, 17L, 252	Underground	Şemsettin Günaltay Avenue
3	Ayşekadın	Kadıköy	İETT Bus: 2, 17, 17L, 252	Underground	Şemsettin Günaltay Avenue
4	Kozyatağı	Ataşehir	İETT Bus: 14KS, 14T, 15KB, 16A, 16B, 16C, 16F, 16FK, 16KH, 16S, 16U, 16Y, 16Z, 17K, 17P, 19, 19B, 19FK, 19H, 19Z, 21B, 21C, 21G, 21K, 21U, 129L, 129T, 130, 130A, 130Ş, 251, 252, 319, 500T, E-10	Underground	Kozyatağı Shopping Mall
5	Küçükbakkalköy	Ataşehir	İETT Bus: 10, 10A, 11T, 13AB, 14A, 14AK, 14CE, 14ÇK, 14S, 19ES, 19FS, 19SB, 19K, 19S, 19T, 19V, 19Y, 319, 320A, 320Y, KM46	Underground	Acıbadem University Kerem Aydınlar Campus
6	İçerenköy	Ataşehir	İETT Bus: 10A, 11T, 13AB, 14A, 14AK, 14CE, 14S, 14T, 14ÇK, 14KS, 18UK, 19, 19D, 19ES, 19FS, 19K, 19S, 19SB, 19T, 19V, 19Y, 319, 320A, 320Y, 133F, KM46	Underground	Ataşehir Sebze ve Meyve Hali・İETT Anatolian Garage
7	Kayışdağı	Ataşehir	İETT Bus: 14A, 14AK, 14S, 14T, 19EK, 19ES, 19SB, 19T, 19Y, 320A, 320Y	Underground	Brandium AVM・Erenköy Gümrük Müdürlüğü
8	Mevlana	Ataşehir	(Planned); İETT Bus: 14A, 14AK, 14CE, 14S, 14T, 14TM, 14ÇK, 14ŞB, 19D, 19E, 19EK, 19ES, 19S, 19SB, 19V, 320, E-3	Underground	İskan Konutları・Yeniçamlıca Mahallesi
9	İMES	Ümraniye	(Planned); İETT Bus: 14A, 14AK, 14CE, 14S, 14T, 14TM, 14ÇK, 14ŞB, 19D, 19E, 19EK, 19ES, 19S, 19SB, 19V, 320	Underground	İMES・Dudullu Organize Sanayi Sitesi・Tavukçuyolu Avenue
10	MODOKO–KEYAP	Ümraniye	İETT Bus: 11P, 14A, 14AK, 14CE, 14ES, 14S, 14T, 14TM, 14YE, 14ÇK, 14ŞB, 15SD, 19D, 19E, 19EK, 19ES, 19S, 19SB, 19V, 20D, 131T, 131YS, 320, UM74	Underground	Modoko・KEYAP・Osmangazi Korusu・NATO Yolu Avenue
11	Dudullu	Ümraniye	İETT Bus: 11V, 11ÇB, 11ÜS, 14, 14TM, 15SD, 19D, 131, 131A, 131B, 131C, 131H, 131TD, 131Ü, 522, 522B	Underground	MetroCorner AVM・Alemdağ Avenue
12	Huzur	Ümraniye	İETT Bus: 9, 14B, 14BK	Underground	Doğa Park・Ümit Park・Adem Yavuz Sağlık Ocağı・Karadeniz Avenue
13	Parseller	Ümraniye	İETT Bus: 14BK	Underground	Depot・Kesikkaya Avenue・Karadeniz Avenue
