= Huzur station =

Station of the Istanbul Metro

Huzur
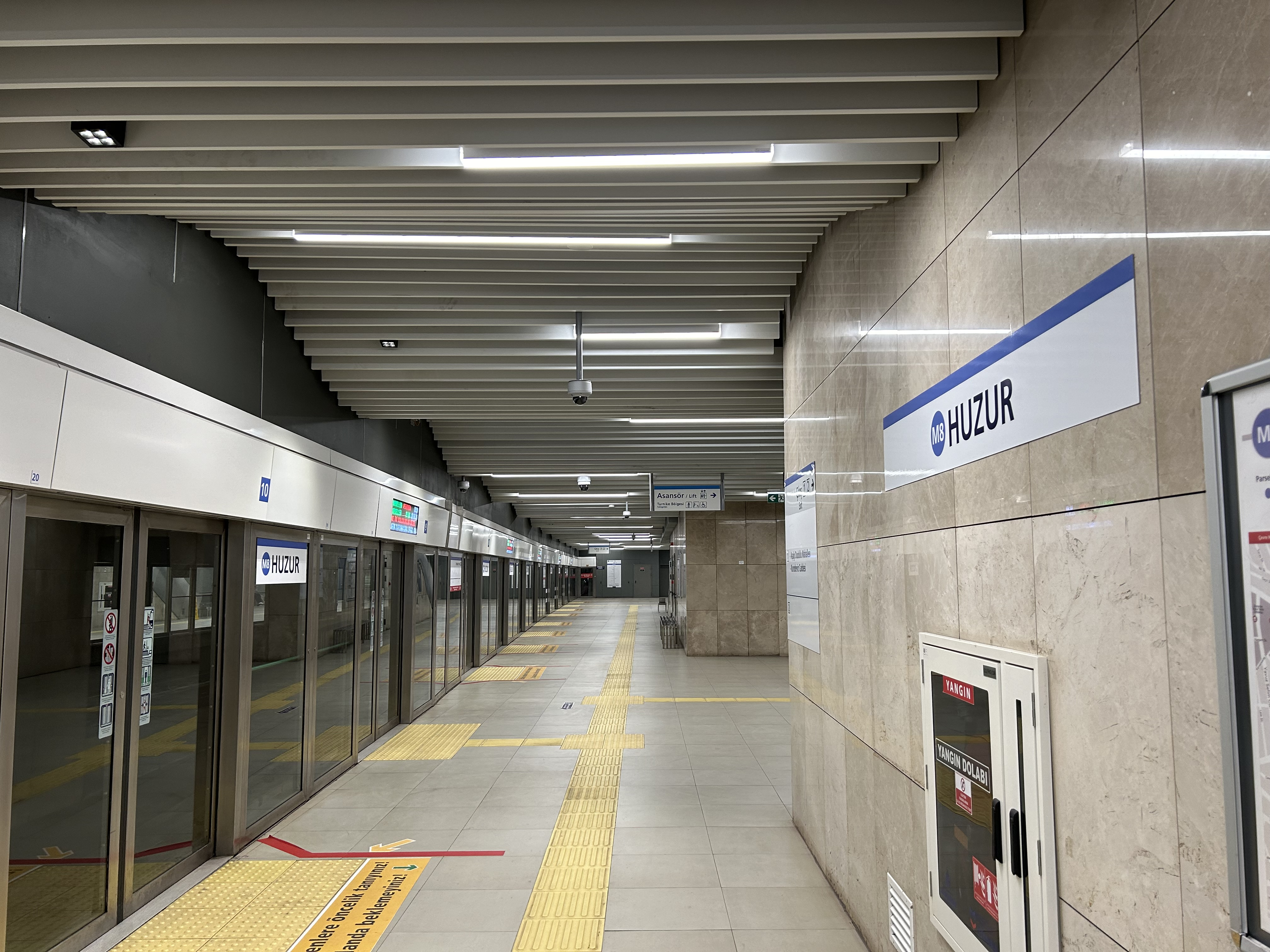
- Platform

General information
- Location: Adem Yavuz Neighborhood, Eski Üsküdar Yolu Street, 34773; Ümraniye, Istanbul; Turkey
- Coordinates: 41°1′22″N 29°9′35″E
- System: Istanbul Metro rapid transit station
- Owner: Istanbul Metropolitan Municipality
- Operator: Istanbul Metro
- Line: M8
- Platforms: 2 Side platforms
- Tracks: 2
- Connections: İETT Bus: 9, 14B, 14BK; Istanbul Minibus: Ümraniye Devlet Hastanesi - Çekmeköy

Construction
- Structure type: Underground
- Parking: No
- Cycle facilities: Yes
- Accessible: Yes

History
- Opened: 6 January 2023 (3 years ago)
- Electrified: 1,500 V DC Overhead line

Services
Preceding station	Istanbul Metro	Following station
Dudullu towards Bostancı	M8 Line	Parseller Terminus
Location

Huzur is an underground station on the M8 line of the Istanbul Metro. It is located under Eski Üsküdar Yolu Street in the Adem Yavuz neighborhood of Ümraniye. It was opened on 6 January 2023.

== Station layout ==
Side platform, doors will open on the right
Southbound	← toward Bostancı (Dudullu)
Northbound	toward Parseller (terminus) →
Side platform, doors will open on the right

== Operation information ==
The line operates between 06:00 and 23:00 and train frequency is 8 minutes and 40 seconds.

== Gallery ==
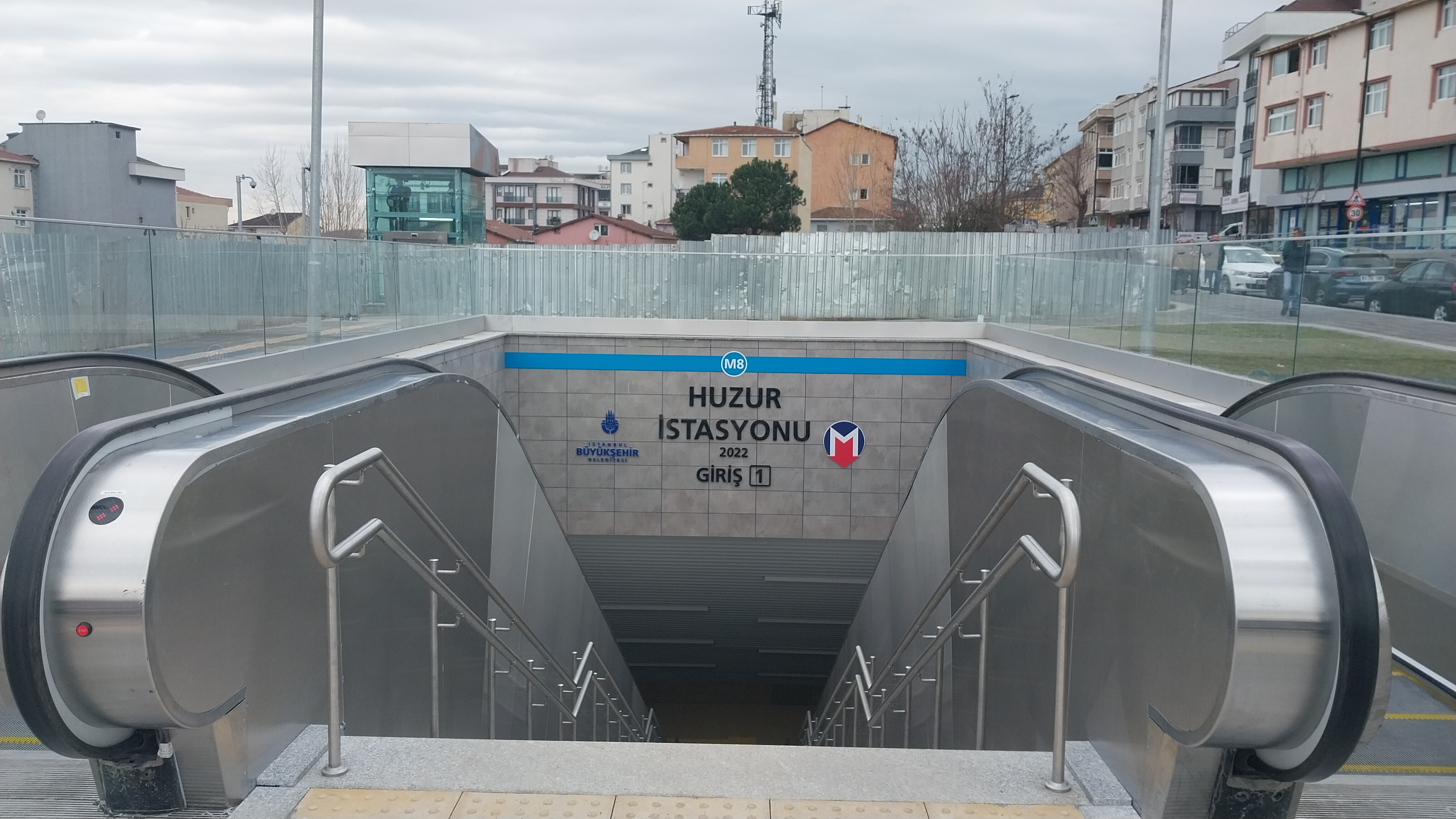
Entrance 1

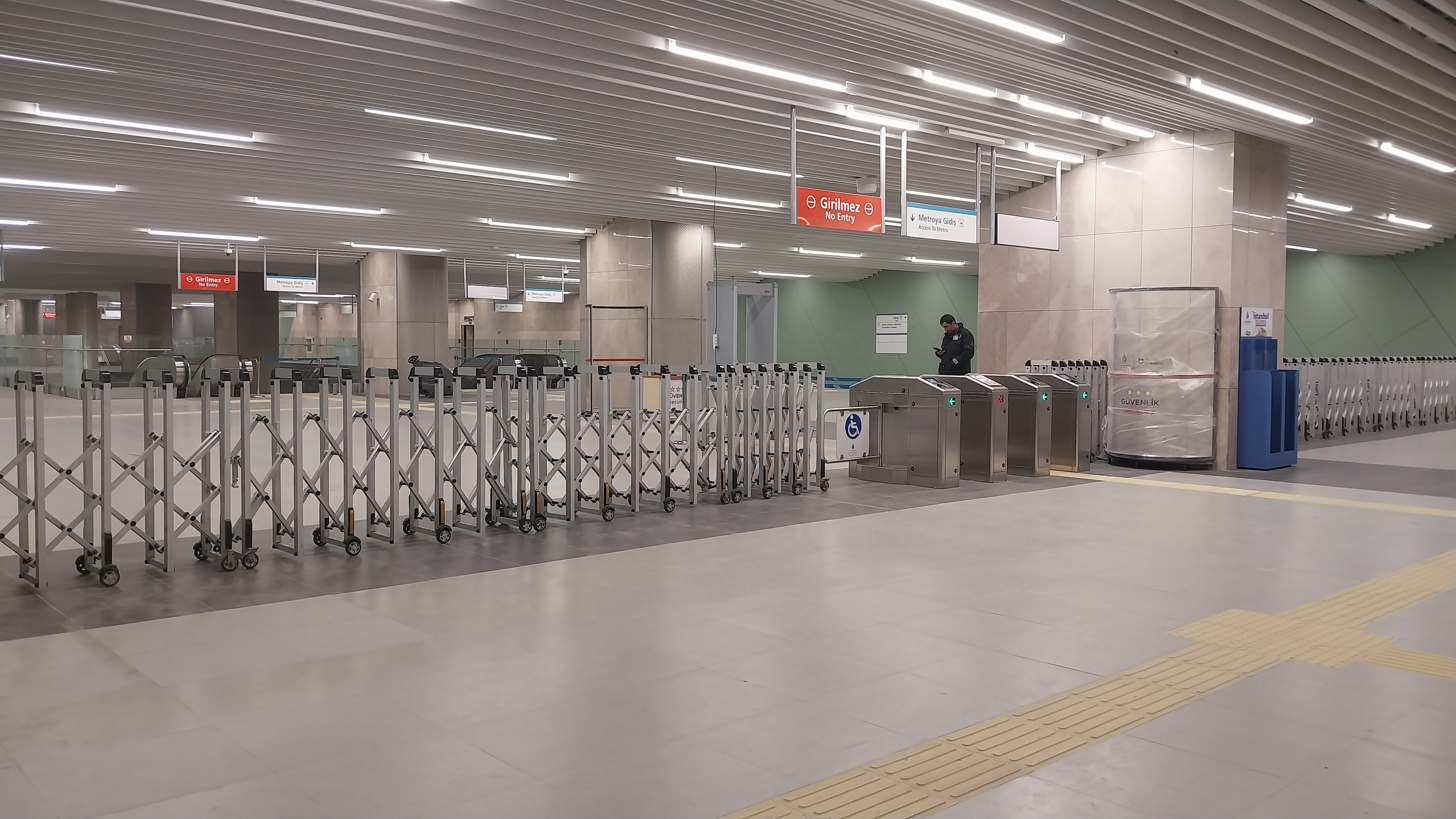
Ticket hall

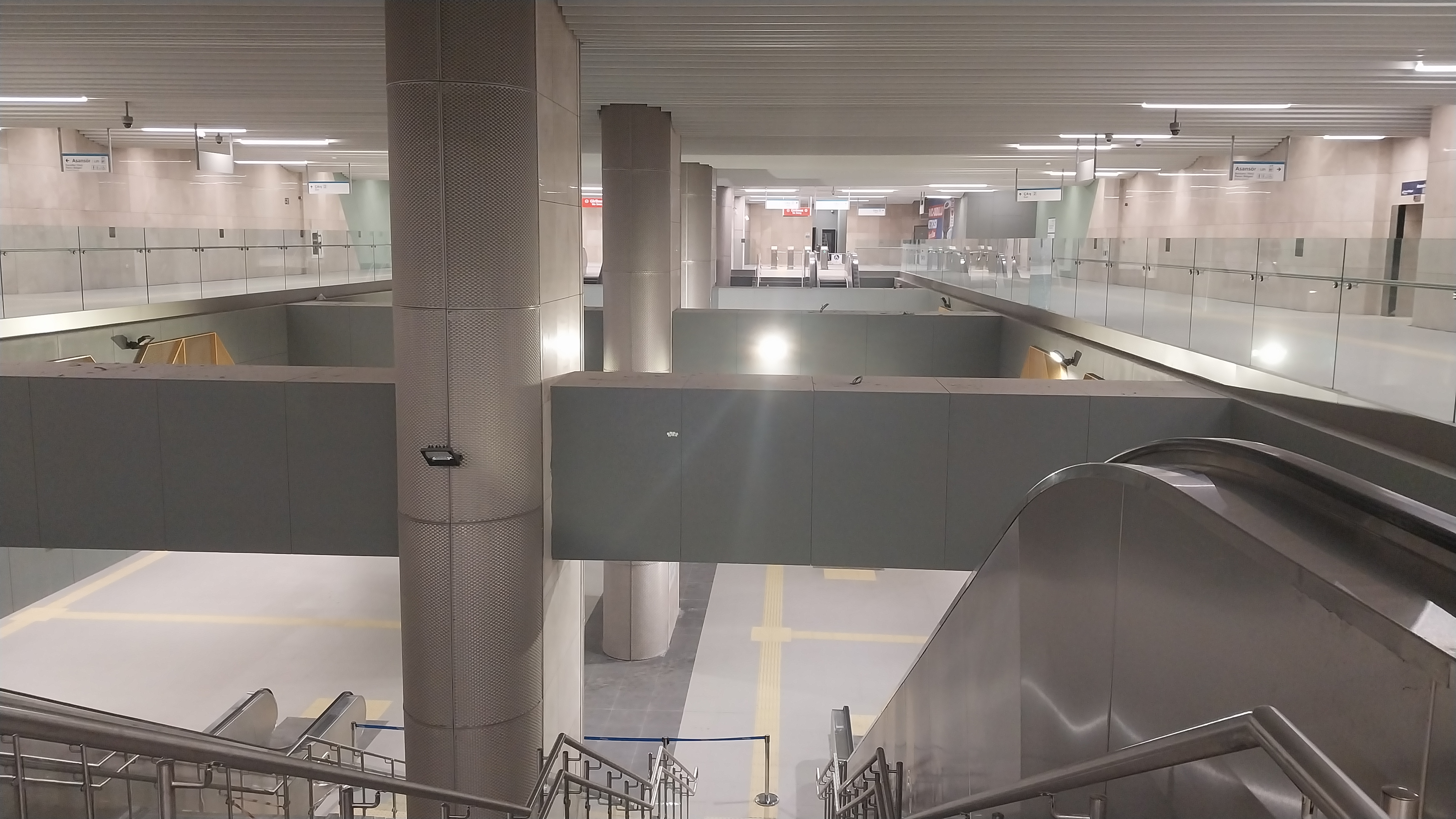
Clearance

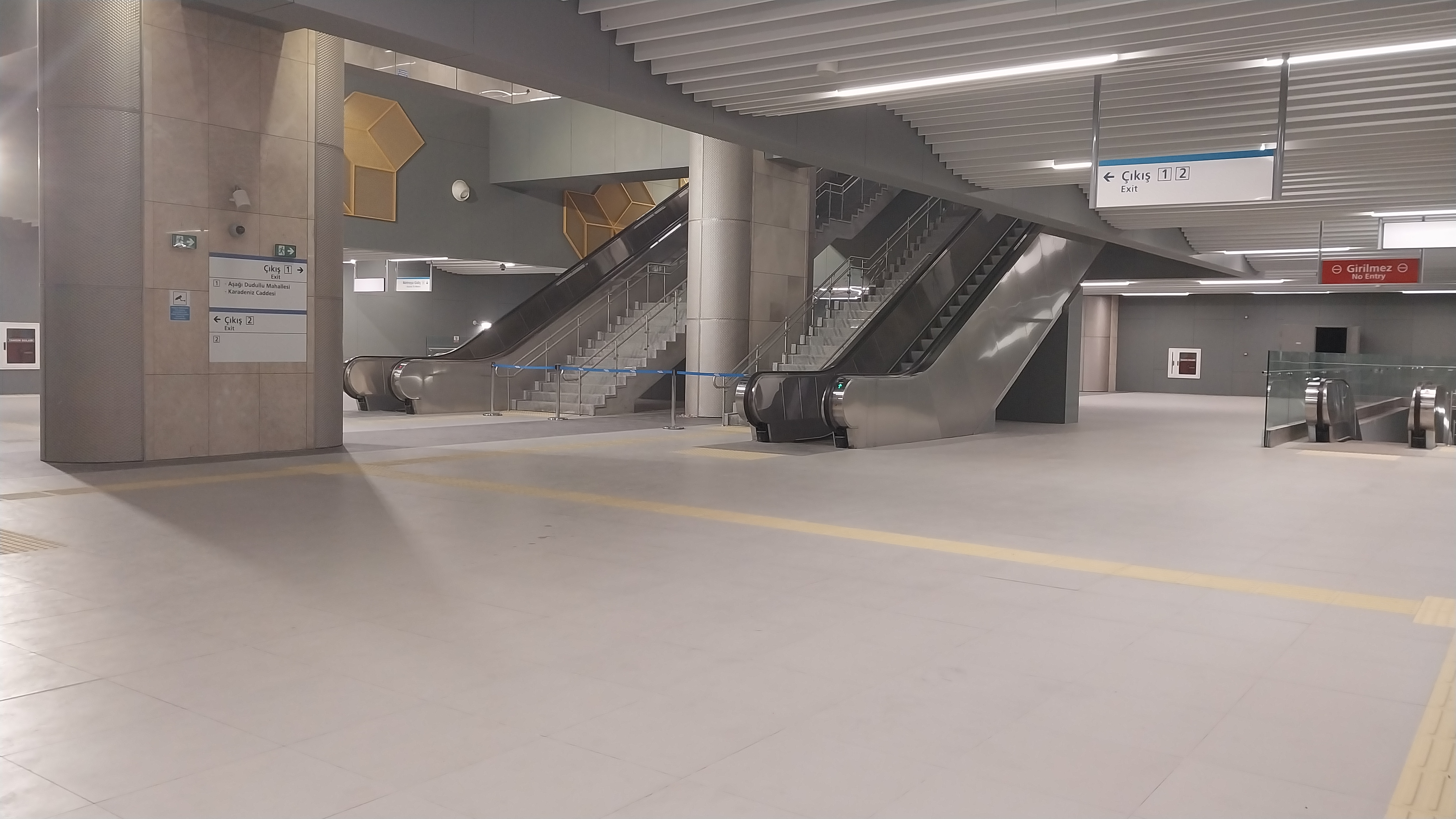
Mezzanine

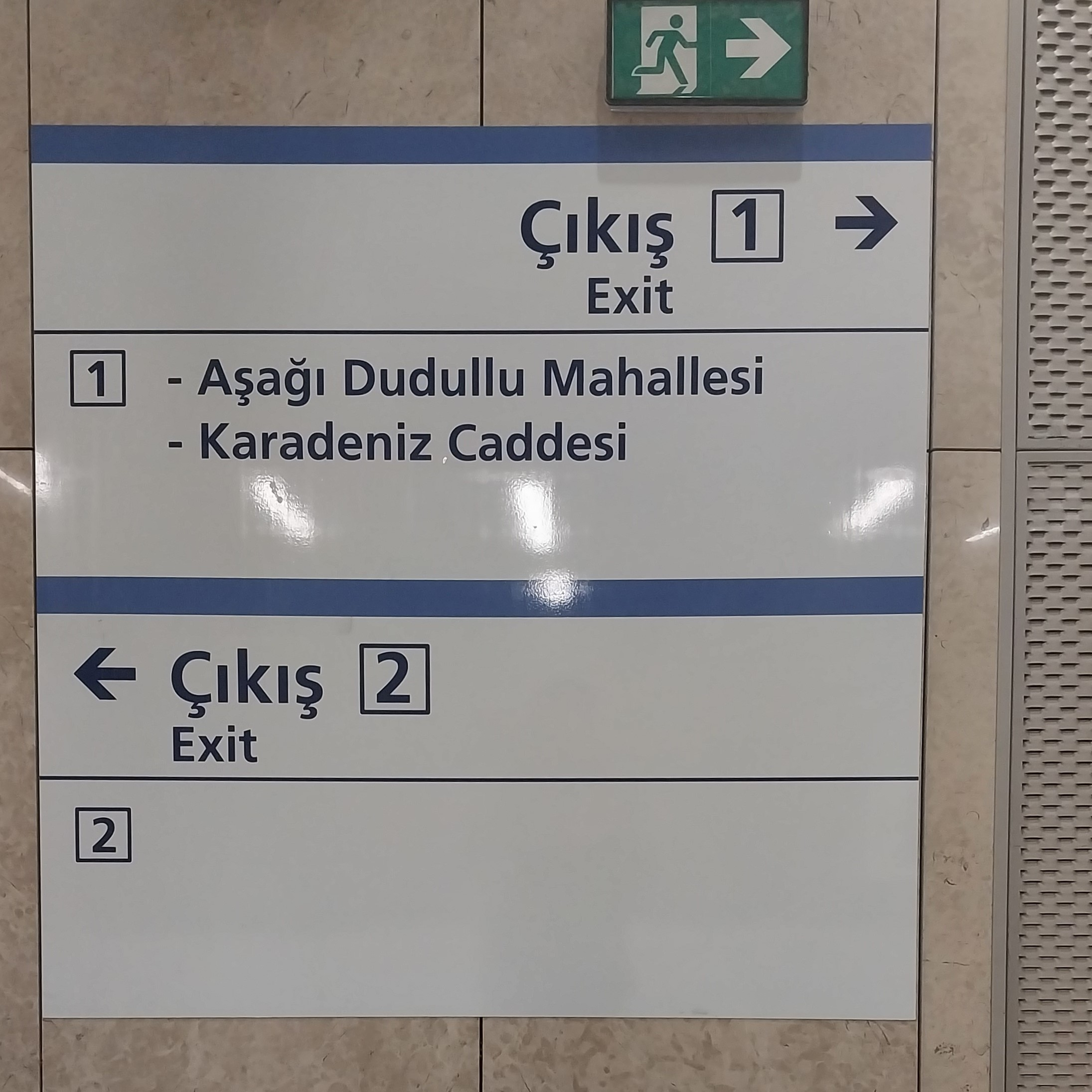
Exit list

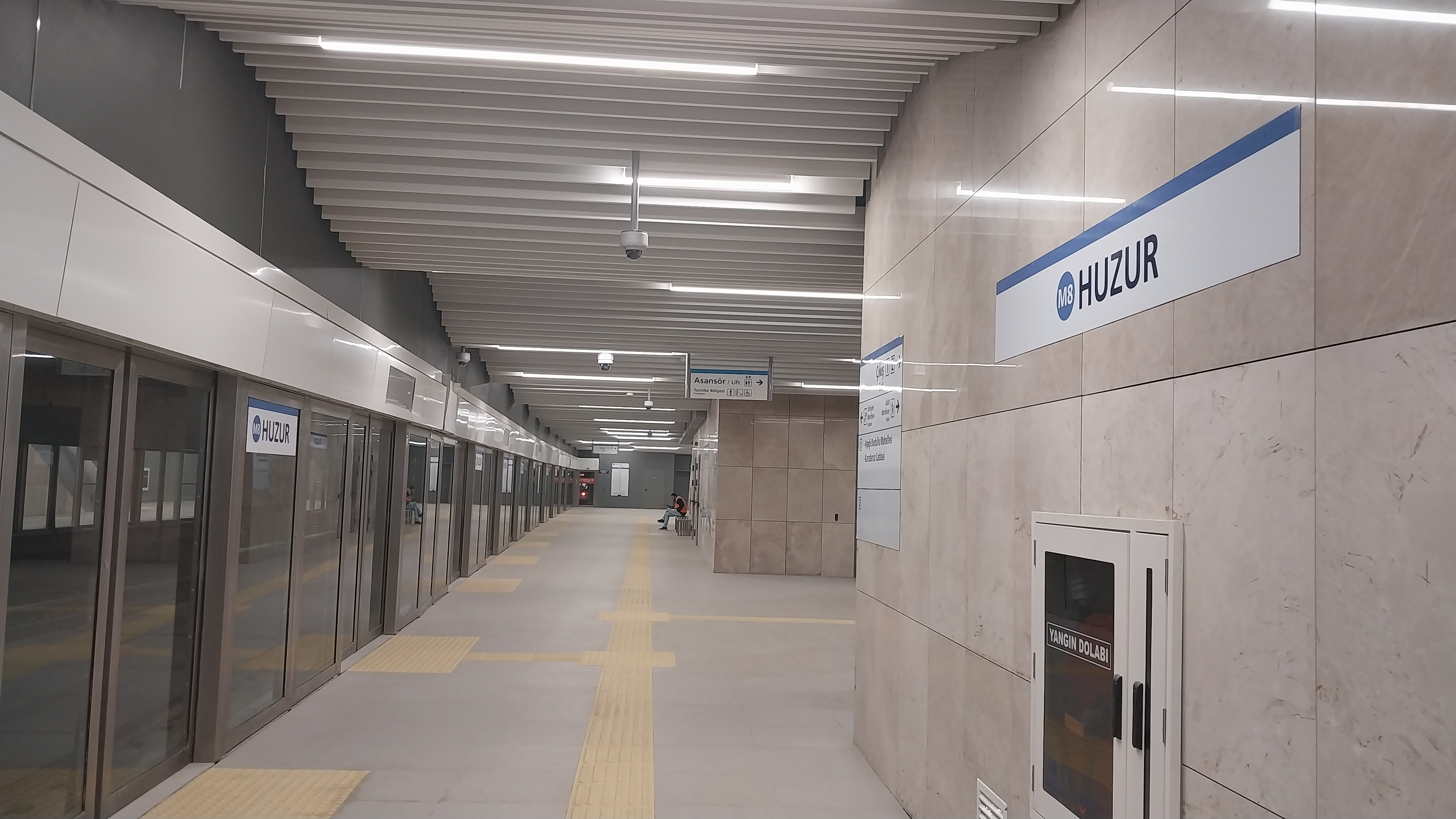
Platform
