= Parseller station =

Station of the Istanbul Metro

Parseller
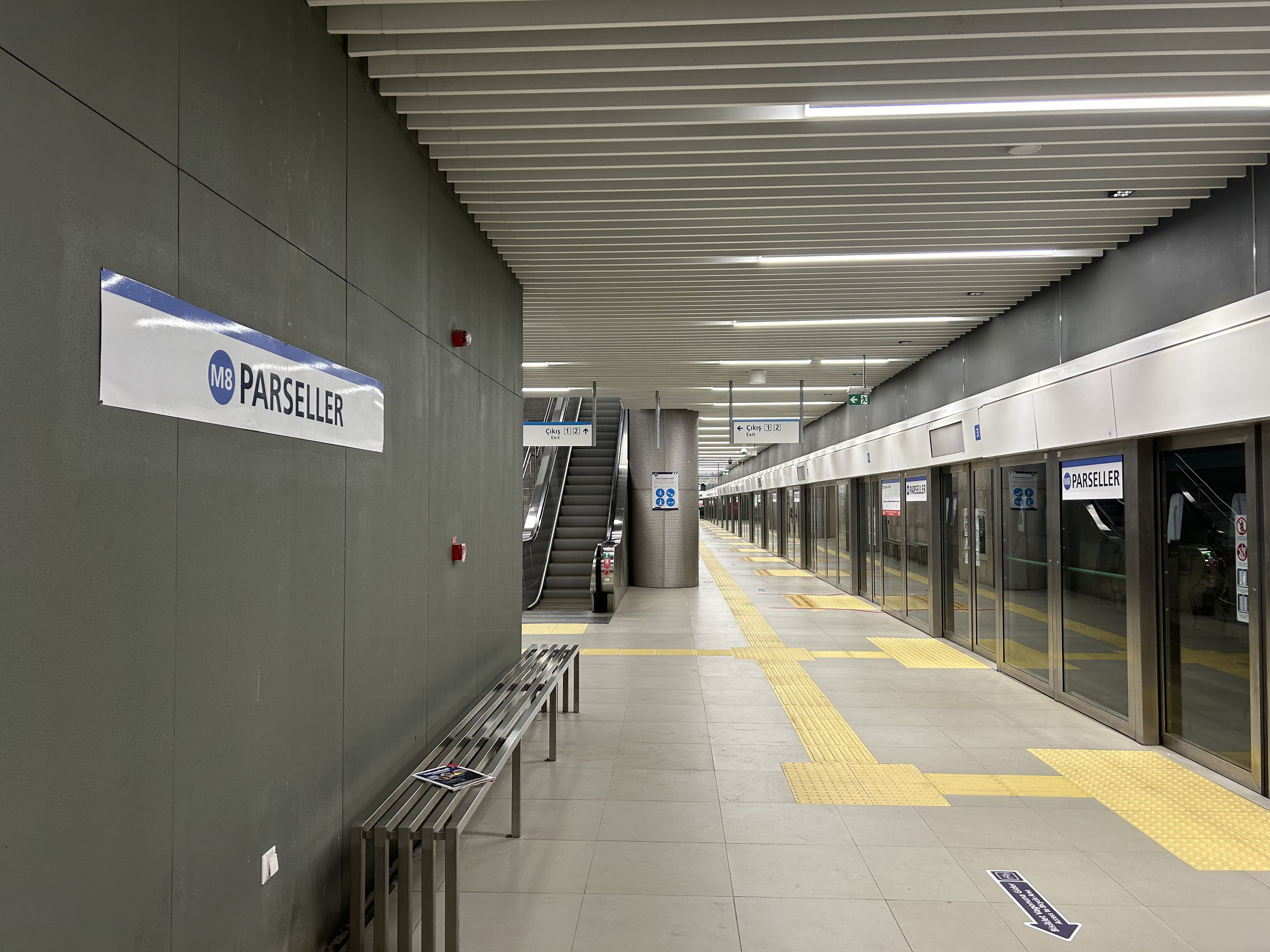
- Platform

General information
- Location: Parseller Neighborhood, Kesikkaya Street, 34773; Ümraniye, Istanbul; Turkey
- Coordinates: 41°1′52″N 29°9′10″E
- System: Istanbul Metro rapid transit station
- Owner: Istanbul Metropolitan Municipality
- Operator: Istanbul Metro
- Line: M8
- Platforms: 2 Side platforms
- Tracks: 2
- Connections: İETT Bus: 14BK; Istanbul Minibus: Ümraniye Devlet Hastanesi - Birlik Mahallesi

Construction
- Structure type: Underground
- Parking: No
- Cycle facilities: Yes
- Accessible: Yes

History
- Opened: 6 January 2023 (3 years ago)
- Electrified: 1,500 V DC Overhead line

Services
Preceding station	Istanbul Metro	Following station
Huzur towards Bostancı	M8 Line	Terminus
Location

Parseller is an underground station on the M8 line of the Istanbul Metro. It is located under Kesikkaya Street in the Parseller neighborhood of Ümraniye. It was opened on 6 January 2023, and is the northern terminus of the line.

North of the station is the Metro Istanbul Behiç Erkin Campus, which was built to be the common operation and warehouse center of the M5, M8 and M12 lines, and the depots of the M5 and M8 lines.

== Station layout ==
Side platform, doors will open on the left
Southbound	← toward Bostancı (Huzur)
Southbound	← toward Bostancı (Huzur)
Side platform, doors will open on the right

== Operation information ==
The line operates between 06:00 and 23:00 and train frequency is 8 minutes and 40 seconds. The line has no night service.

== Gallery ==
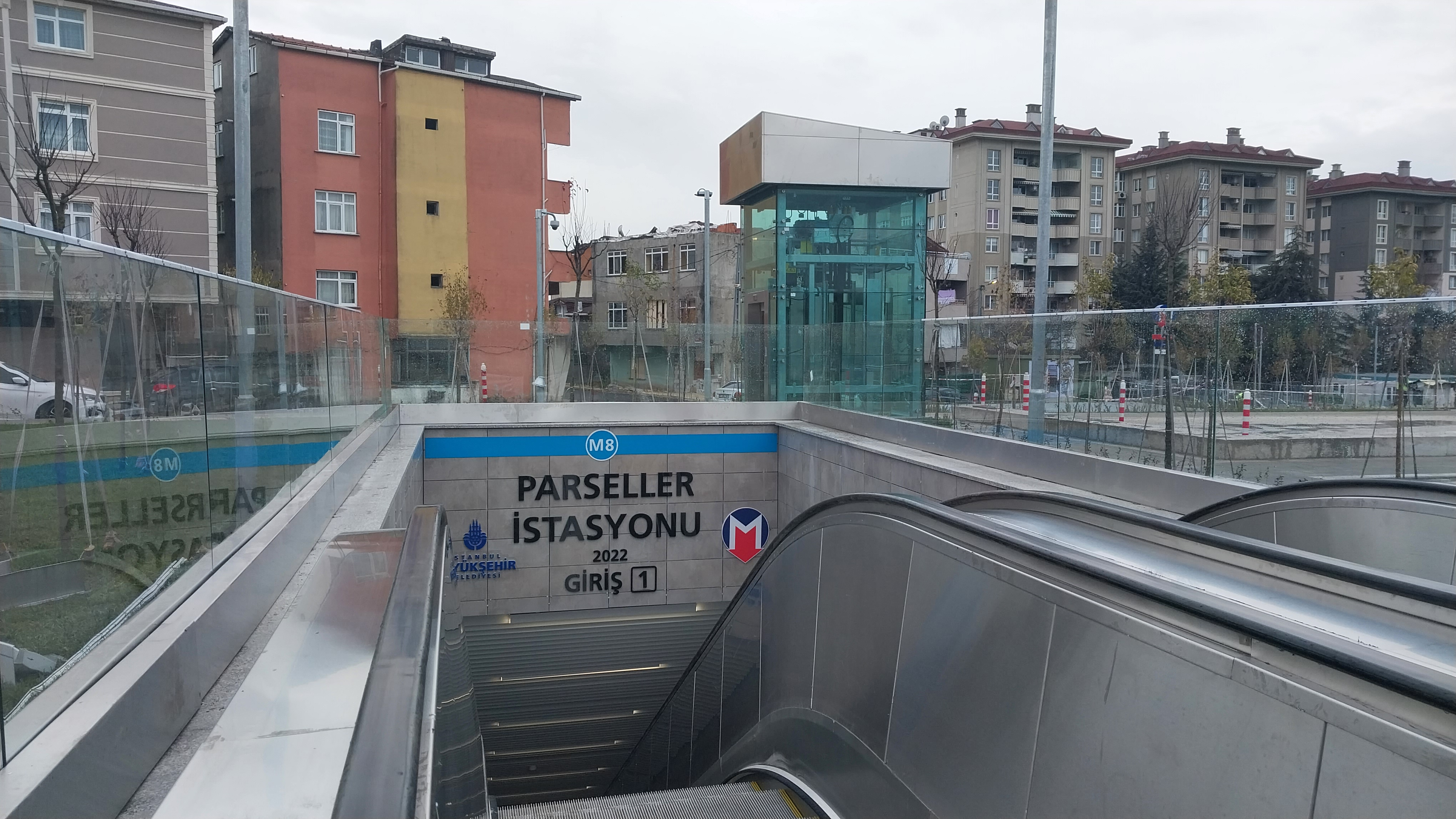
Entrance 1

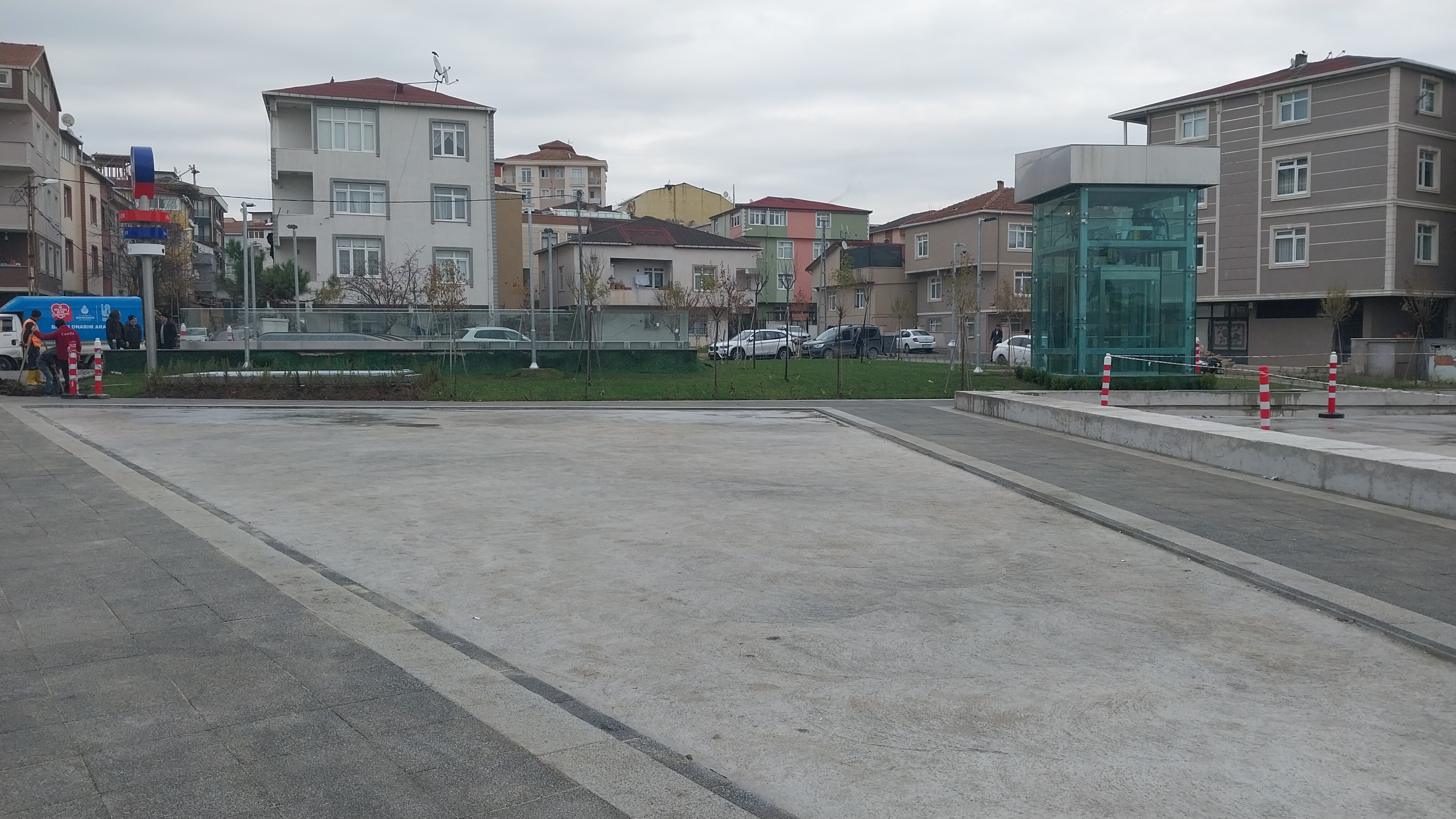
Entrance 1 side view

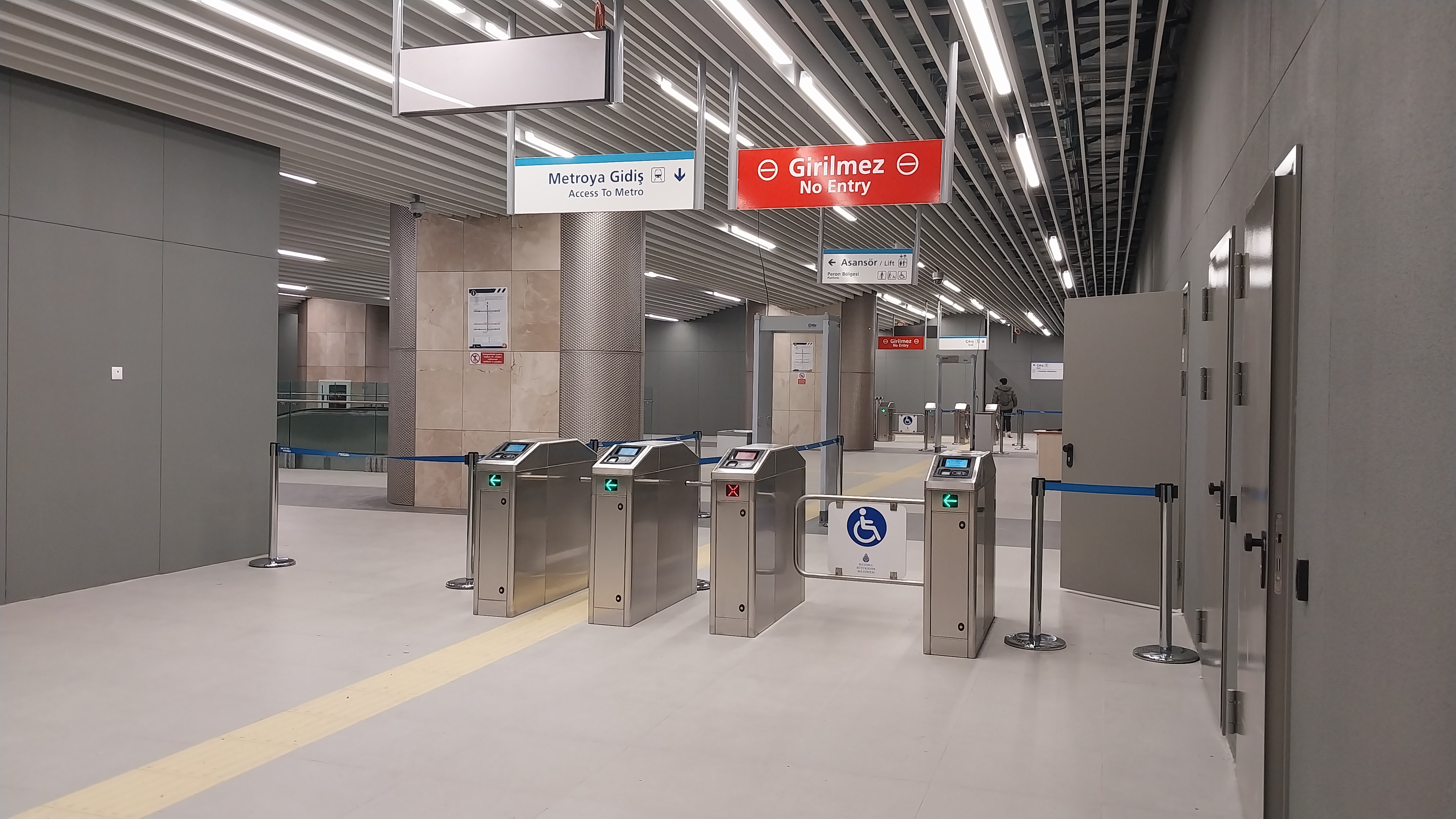
Ticket hall

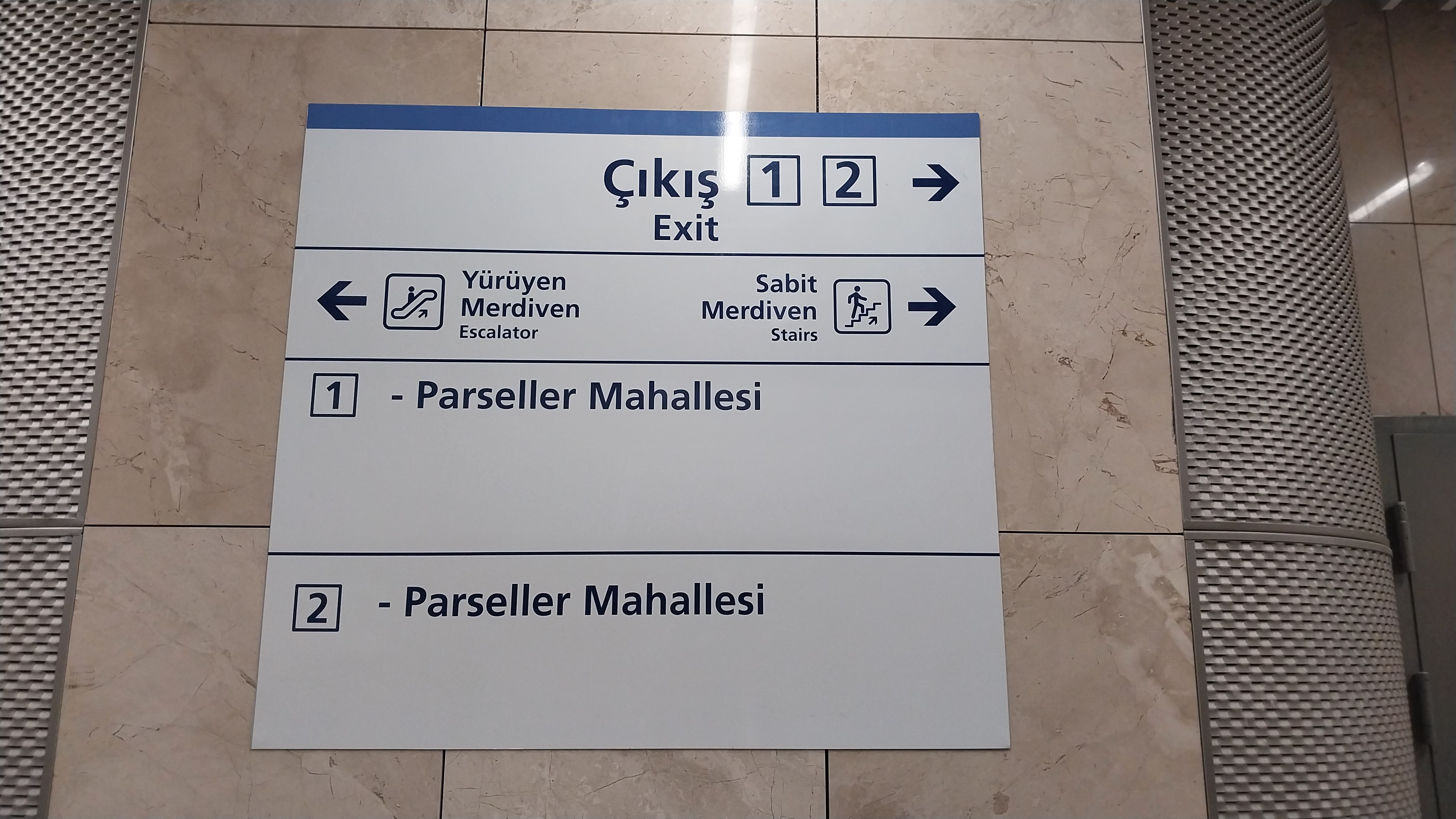
Exit list

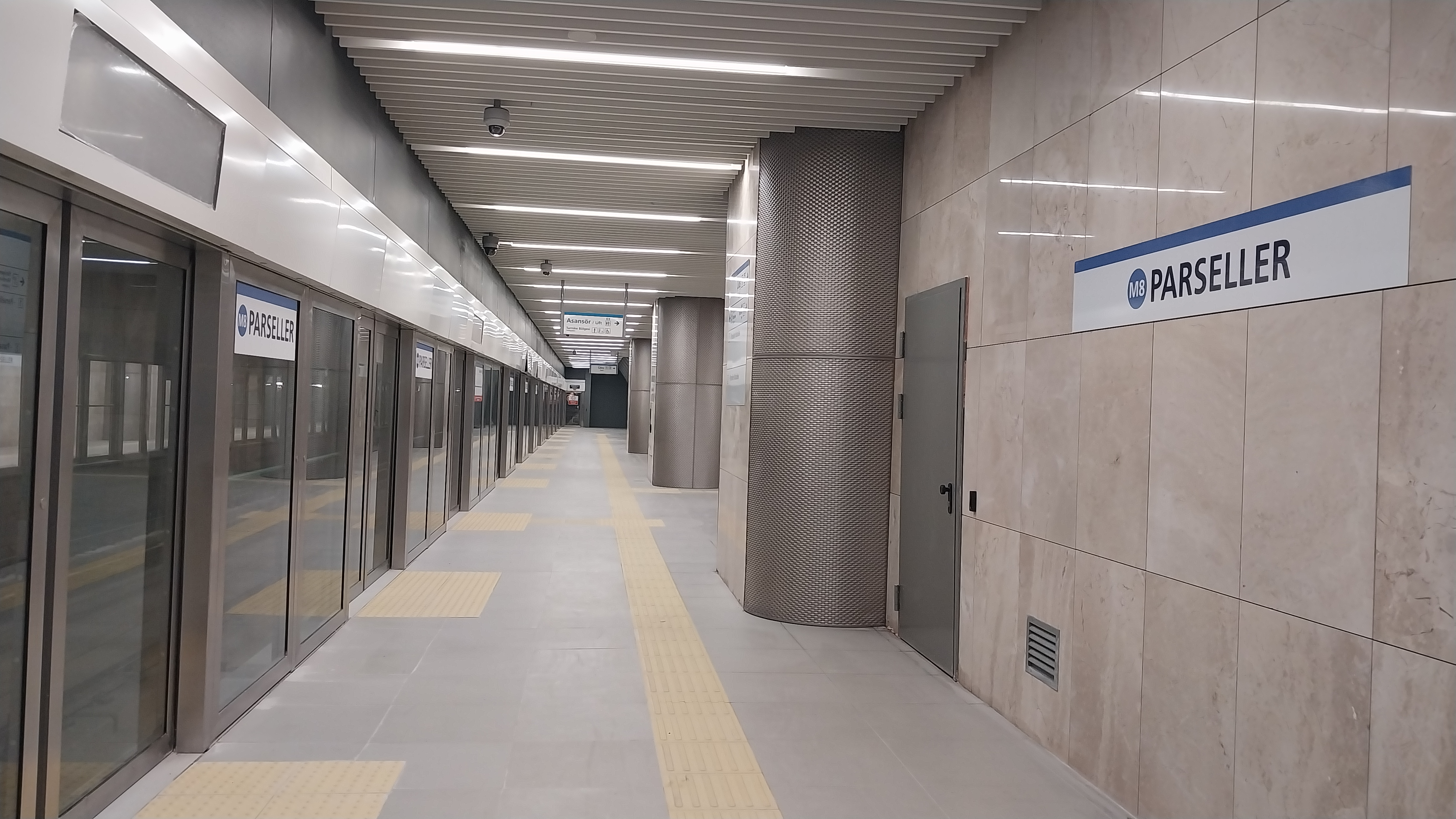
Platform
