= Bostancı (Istanbul Metro) =

The Istanbul Metro has two stations with the name Bostancı:

- Bostancı station (M4) on the M4 line.
- Bostancı station (M8) on the M8 line.
