= Ayşekadın station =

Station of the Istanbul Metro

Ayşekadın
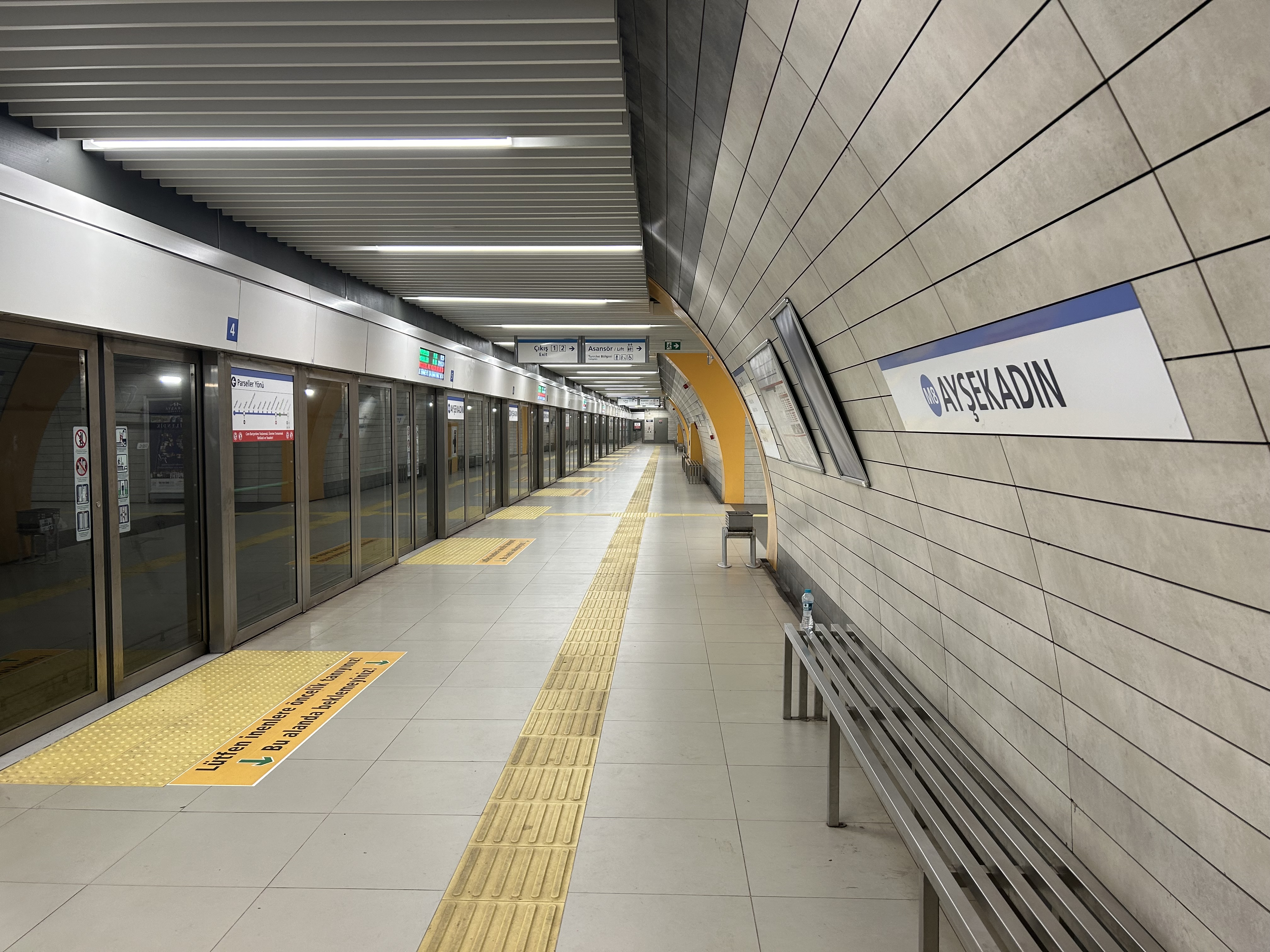
- Platform

General information
- Location: 19 Mayıs Neighborhood, Şemsettin Günaltay Street, 34736; Kadıköy, Istanbul; Turkey
- Coordinates: 40°58′0″N 29°5′12″E
- System: Istanbul Metro rapid transit station
- Owner: Istanbul Metropolitan Municipality
- Operator: Istanbul Metro
- Line: M8
- Platforms: 1 Island platform
- Tracks: 2
- Connections: İETT Bus: 2, 17, 17L, 252; Istanbul Minibus: Kadıköy - Pendik, Kadıköy - Ferhatpaşa, Kadıköy - Küçükbakkalköy - Ataşehir

Construction
- Structure type: Underground
- Parking: No
- Cycle facilities: Yes
- Accessible: Yes

History
- Opened: 6 January 2023 (3 years ago)
- Electrified: 1,500 V DC Overhead line

Services
Preceding station	Istanbul Metro	Following station
Emin Ali Paşa towards Bostancı	M8 Line	Kozyatağı towards Parseller
Location

Ayşekadın is an underground station on the M8 line of the Istanbul Metro. It is located under Şemsettin Günaltay Street in the 19 Mayıs neighborhood of Kadıköy. It was opened on 6 January 2023.

== Station layout ==
Platform level	Southbound	← toward Bostancı (Emin Ali Paşa)
Platform level	Island platform, doors will open on the left
Platform level	Northbound	toward Parseller (Kozyatağı) →

== Operation information ==
The line operates between 06:00 and 23:00 and train frequency is 8 minutes and 40 seconds. The line has no night service.

== Gallery ==
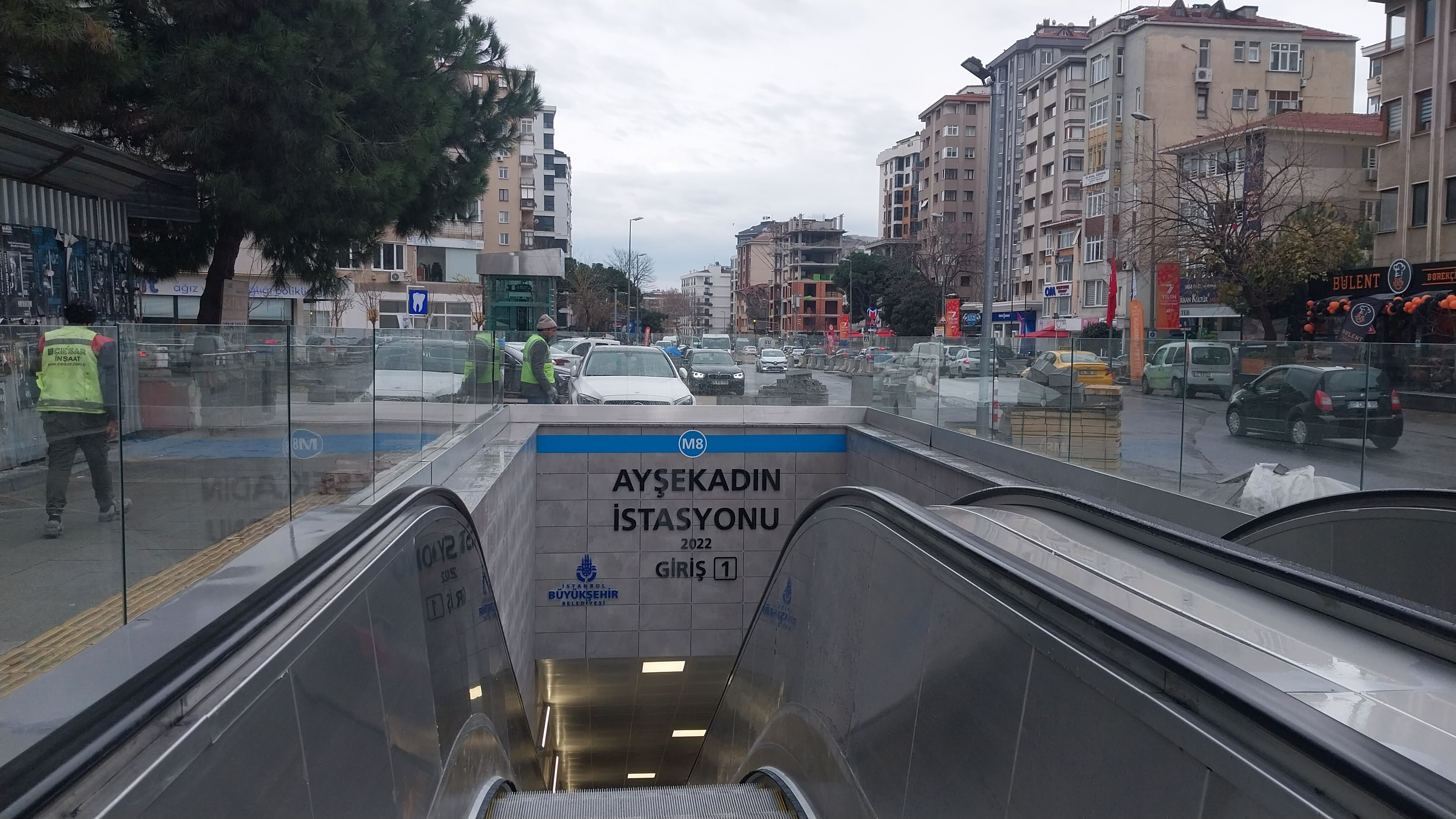
Exit 1

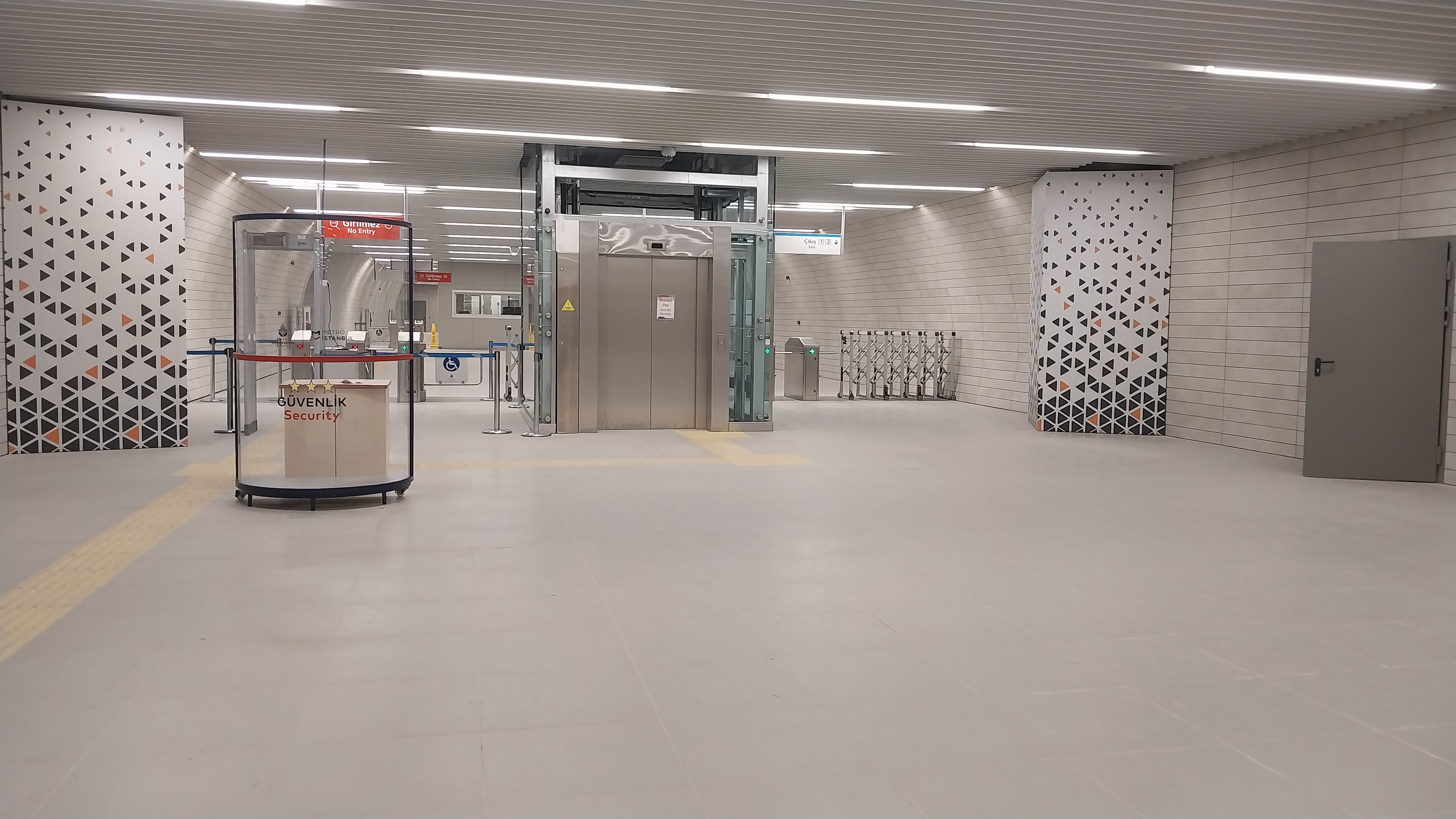
Ticket hall

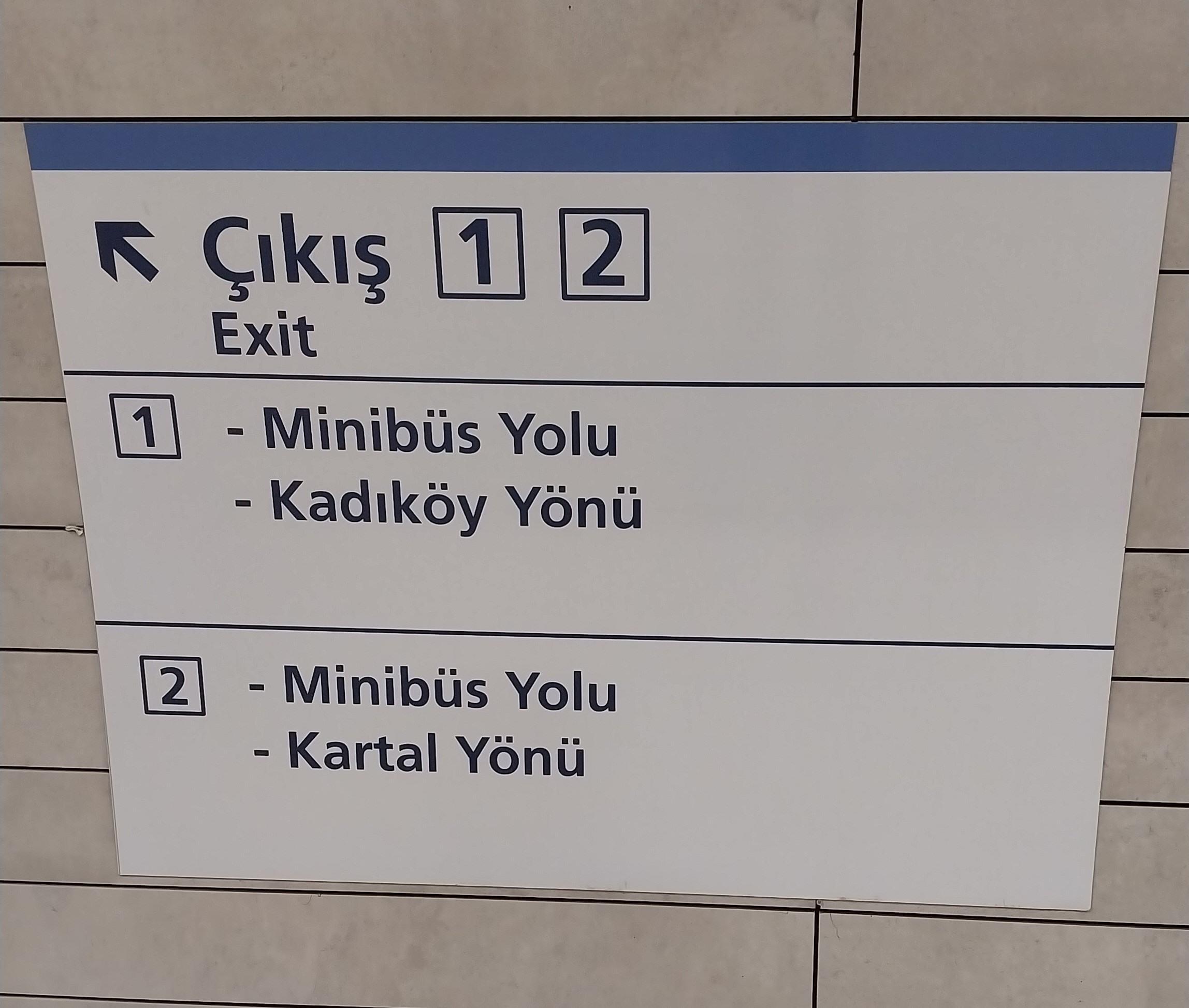
Exit list

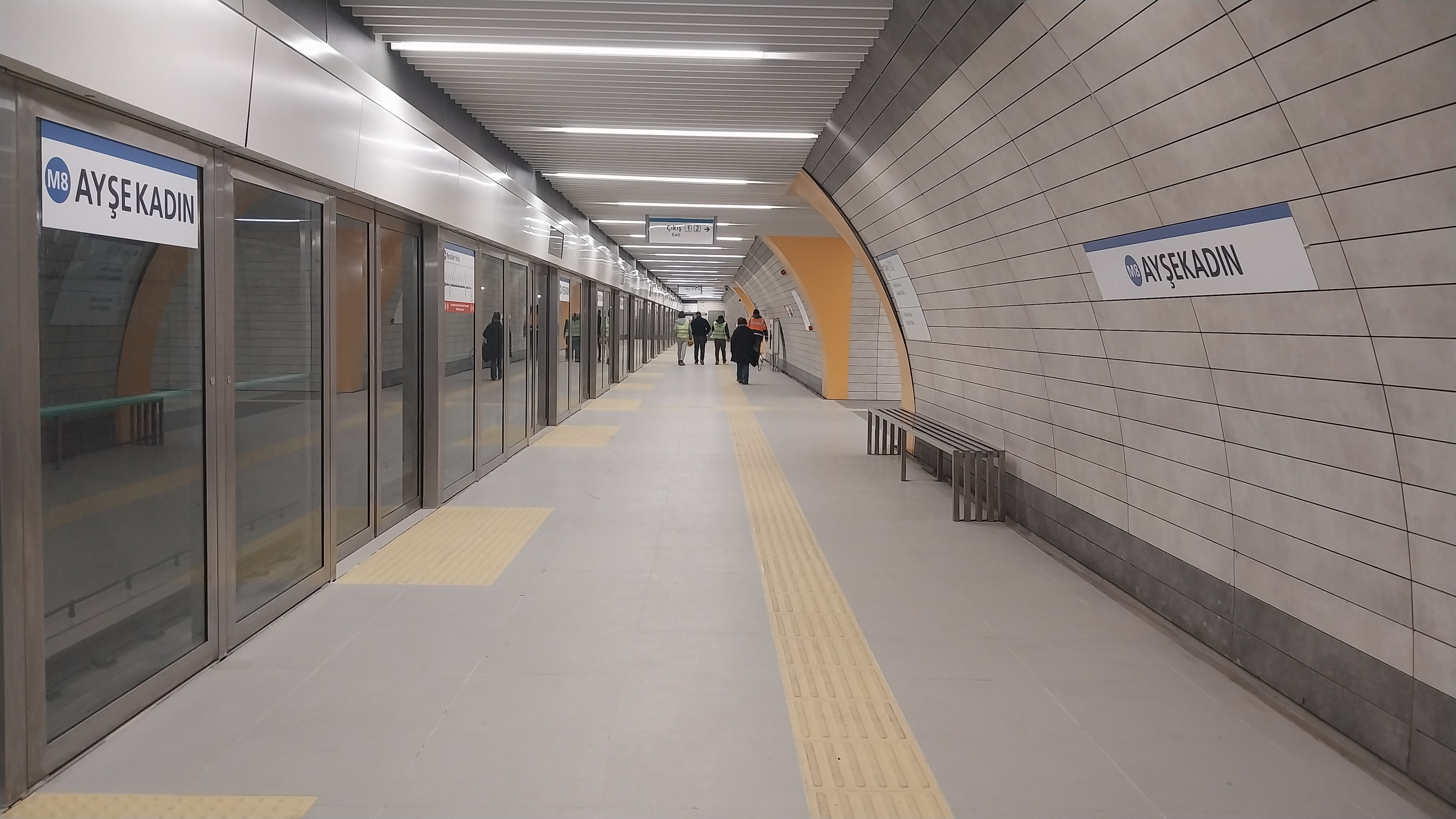
Platform
