= Kozyatağı station =

Station of the Istanbul Metro

Kozyatağı (M4) Kozyatağı (M8)
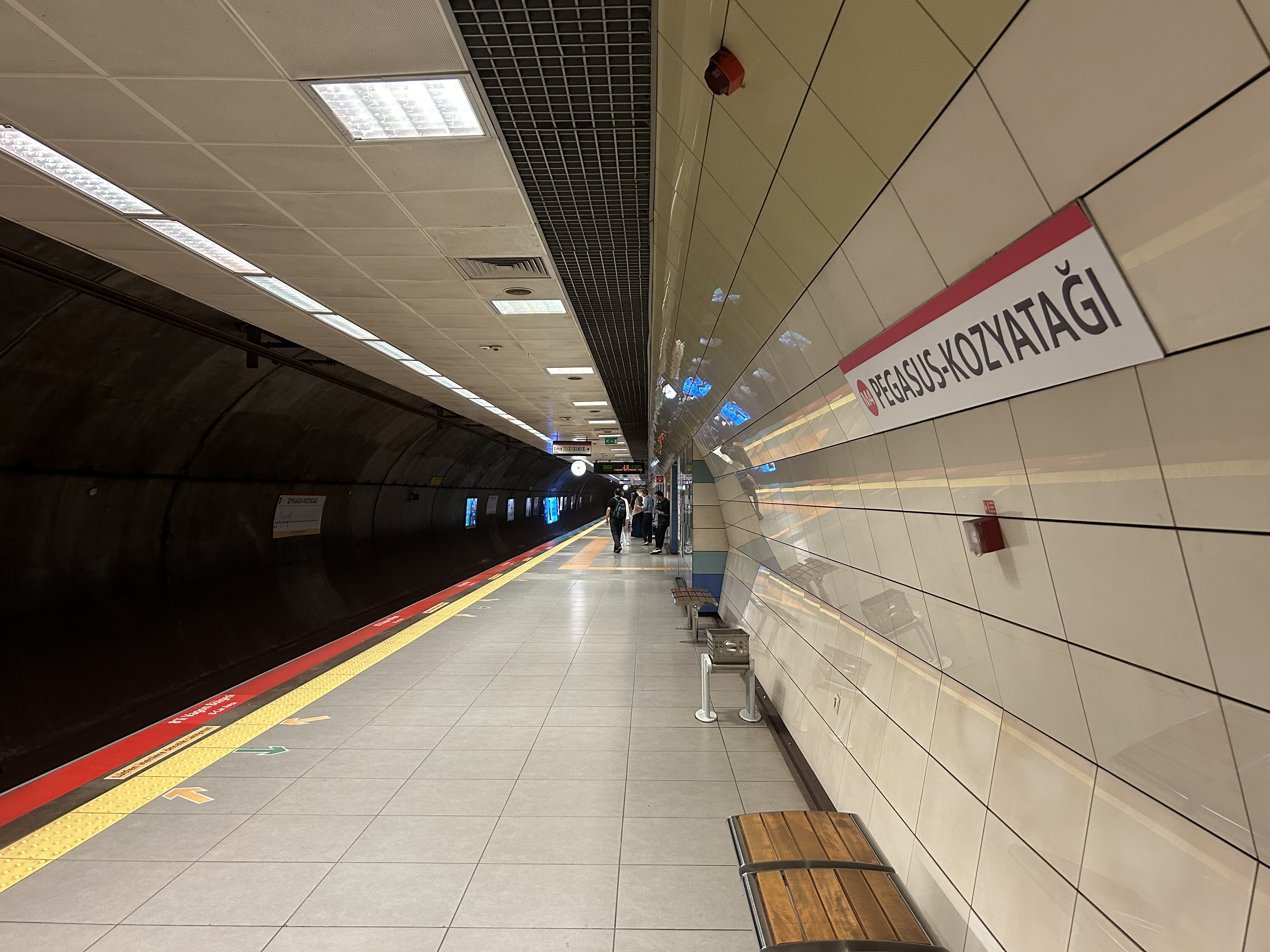
- M4 platform

General information
- Location: E-5 Yanyolu, İçerenköy Mah., 34752; Kadıköy, Istanbul
- Coordinates: 40°58′39″N 29°6′0″E
- System: Istanbul Metro rapid transit station
- Owner: Istanbul Metropolitan Municipality
- Operator: Istanbul Metro
- Lines: M4; M8
- Platforms: 2 island platform
- Tracks: 4
- Connections: İETT Bus: 14KS, 14T, 15KB, 16A, 16B, 16C, 16F, 16FK, 16KH, 16S, 16U, 16Y, 16Z, 17K, 17P, 19, 19B, 19FK, 19H, 19Z, 21B, 21C, 21G, 21K, 21U, 129L, 129T, 130, 130A, 130Ş, 251, 252, 319, 500T, E-10; Istanbul Minibus: Harem-Gebze, Kadıköy-Kartal, Kadıköy-Uğur Mumcu

Construction
- Structure type: Underground
- Parking: Yes
- Cycle facilities: Yes
- Accessible: Yes

History
- Opened: M4: 17 August 2012 (14 years ago); M8: 6 January 2023 (3 years ago)
- Electrified: 1,500 V DC Overhead line

Services
Preceding station	Istanbul Metro	Following station
Yenisahra towards Kadıköy	M4 Line	Bostancı towards Sabiha Gökçen Airport
Ayşekadın towards Bostancı	M8 Line	K. Bakkalköy towards Parseller
Location

Kozyatağı is an underground transfer station for the M4 and M8 lines of the Istanbul Metro. Located under the D.100 state highway in Kozyatağı, it was opened on 17 August 2012 for the M4 and on 6 January 2023 for the M8 line.

In accordance with a sponsorship agreement with Pegasus Airlines, the name of the M4 station was changed to Pegasus - Kozyatağı in 2022, with the name returning to simply Kozyatağı in May 2026 after the expiration of the agreement.

== Layout ==
=== M4 platform ===
Platform level	Westbound	← toward Kadıköy (Yenisahra)
Platform level	Island platform, doors will open on the left
Platform level	Eastbound	toward Sabiha Gökçen Airport (Bostancı) →

=== M8 platform ===
Platform level	Southbound	← toward Bostancı (Ayşekadın)
Platform level	Island platform, doors will open on the left
Platform level	Northbound	toward Parseller (K. Bakkalköy) →

== Operation information ==
=== M4 ===
The M4 line operates between 06:00 and 00:00 with a train frequency of 4 minutes at peak hours and 7 minutes at all other times. The line also operates night metro services between 00:00 and 06:00 on Saturdays and Sundays, with trains running every 30 minutes. This provides 66 hours of uninterrupted service between Friday and Sunday. During these hours, fares are charged at double the price. During this time, Entrances 2 and 3 are open, whilst Entrance 1 is closed.

=== M8 ===
The M8 line operates between 06:00 and 23:00 and train frequency is 8 minutes and 40 seconds. The line has no night service.

== Gallery ==
=== M4 ===
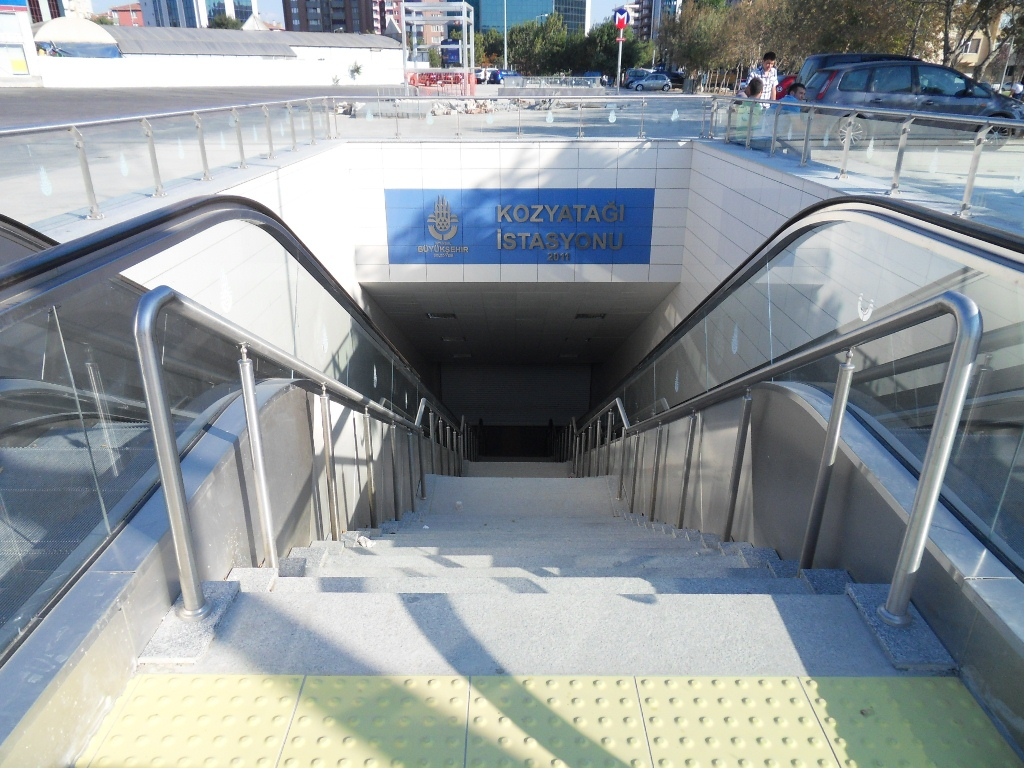
Entrance

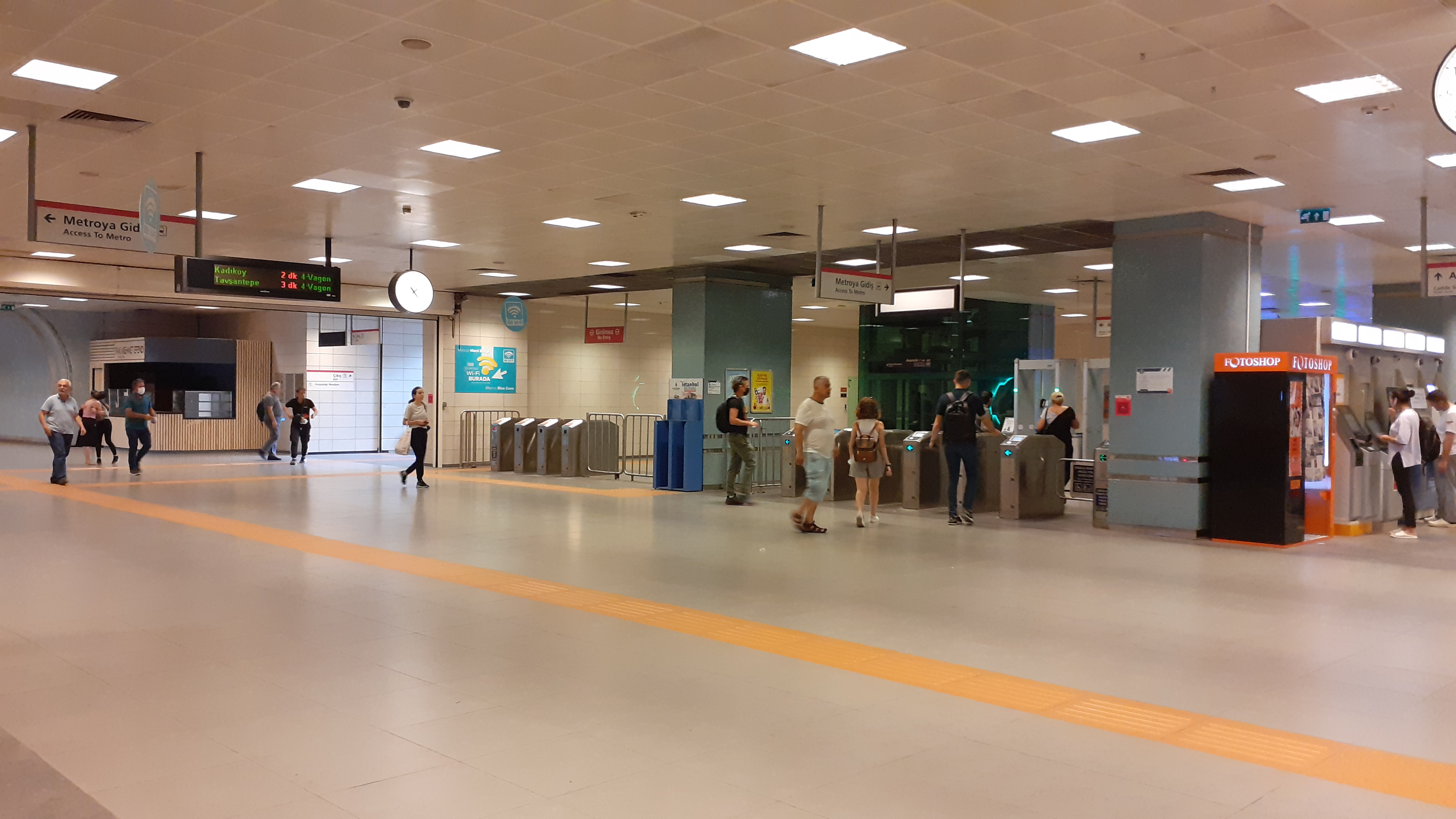
East Ticket Hall

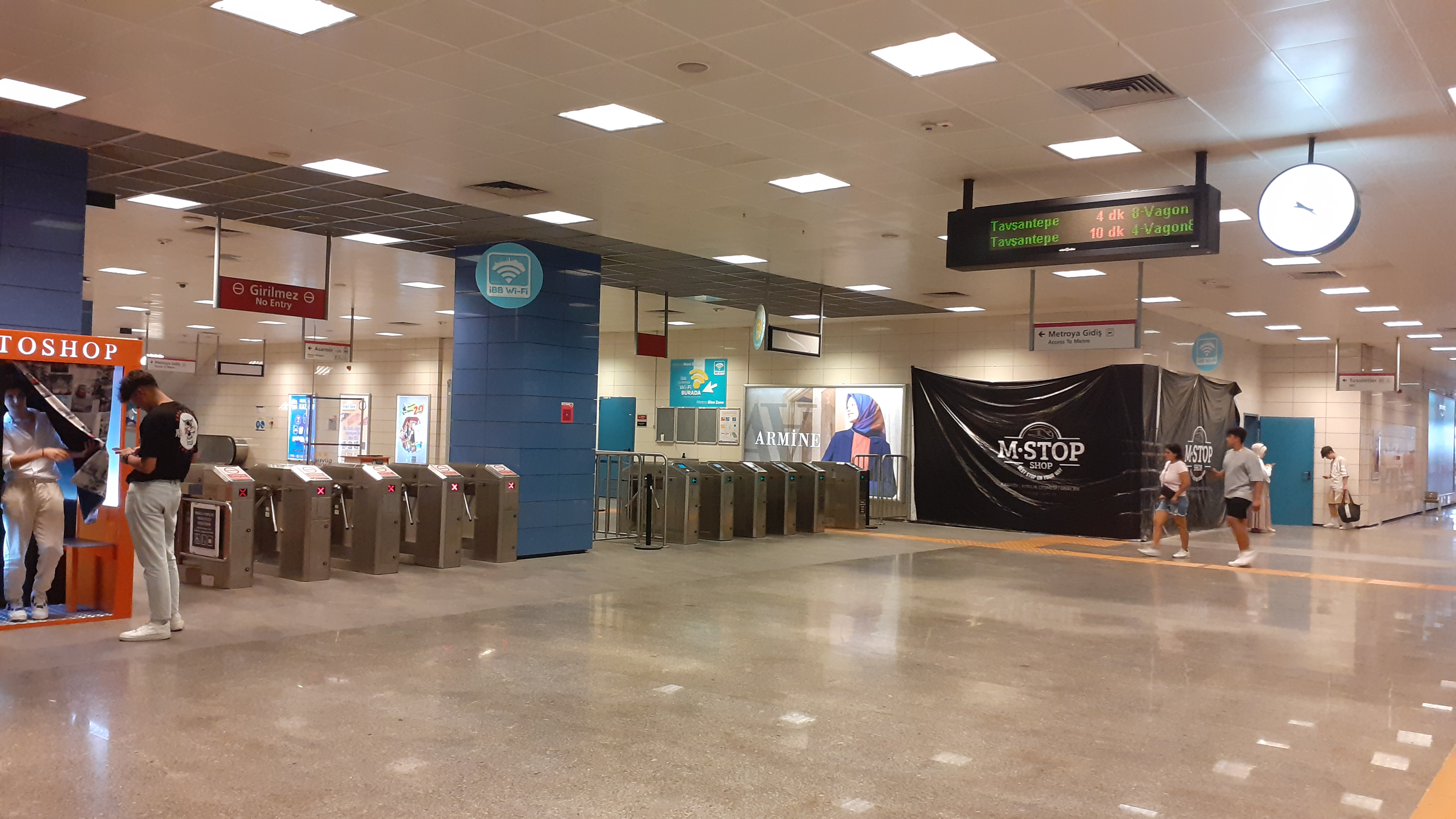
West Ticket Hall

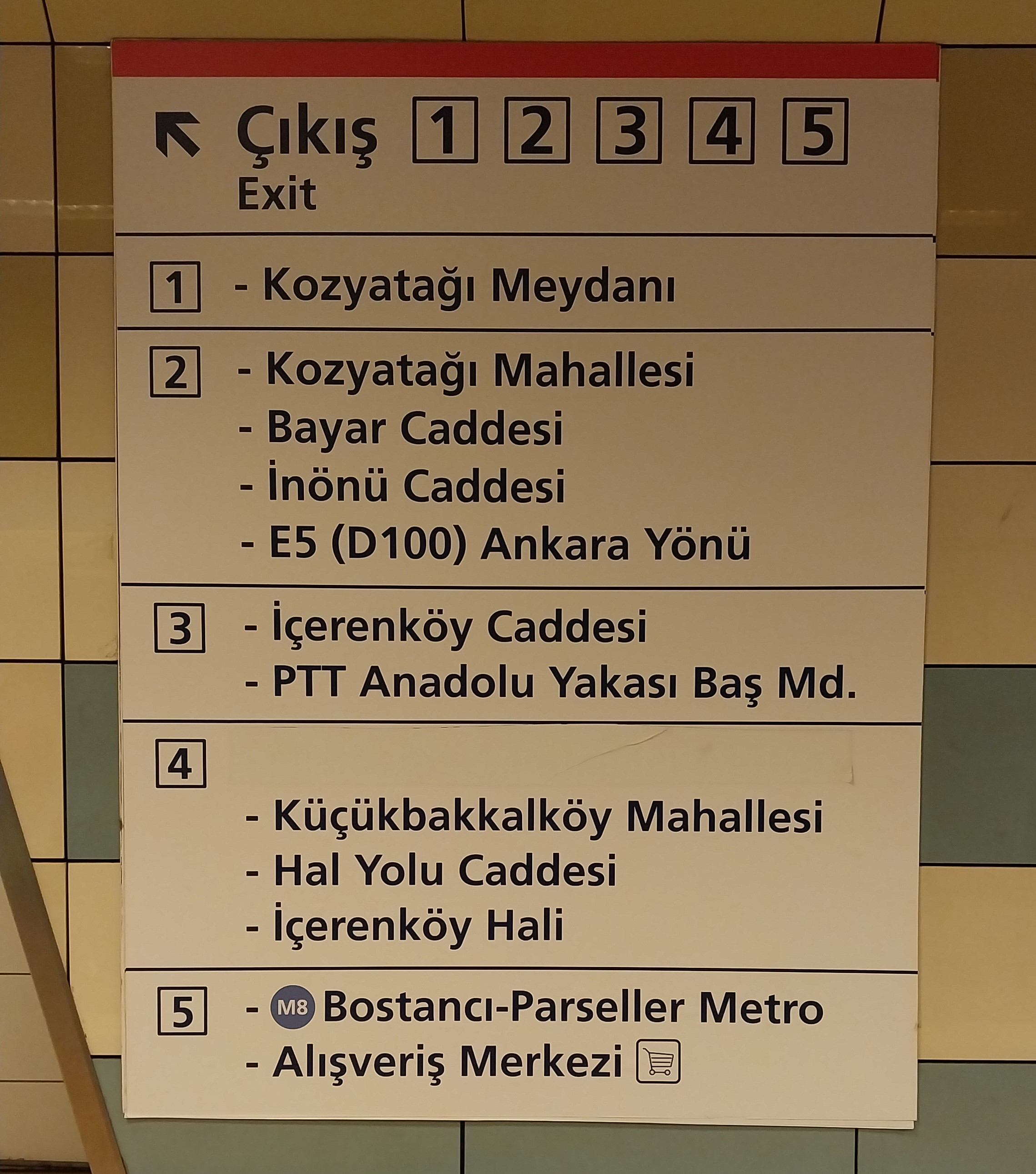
Exit List

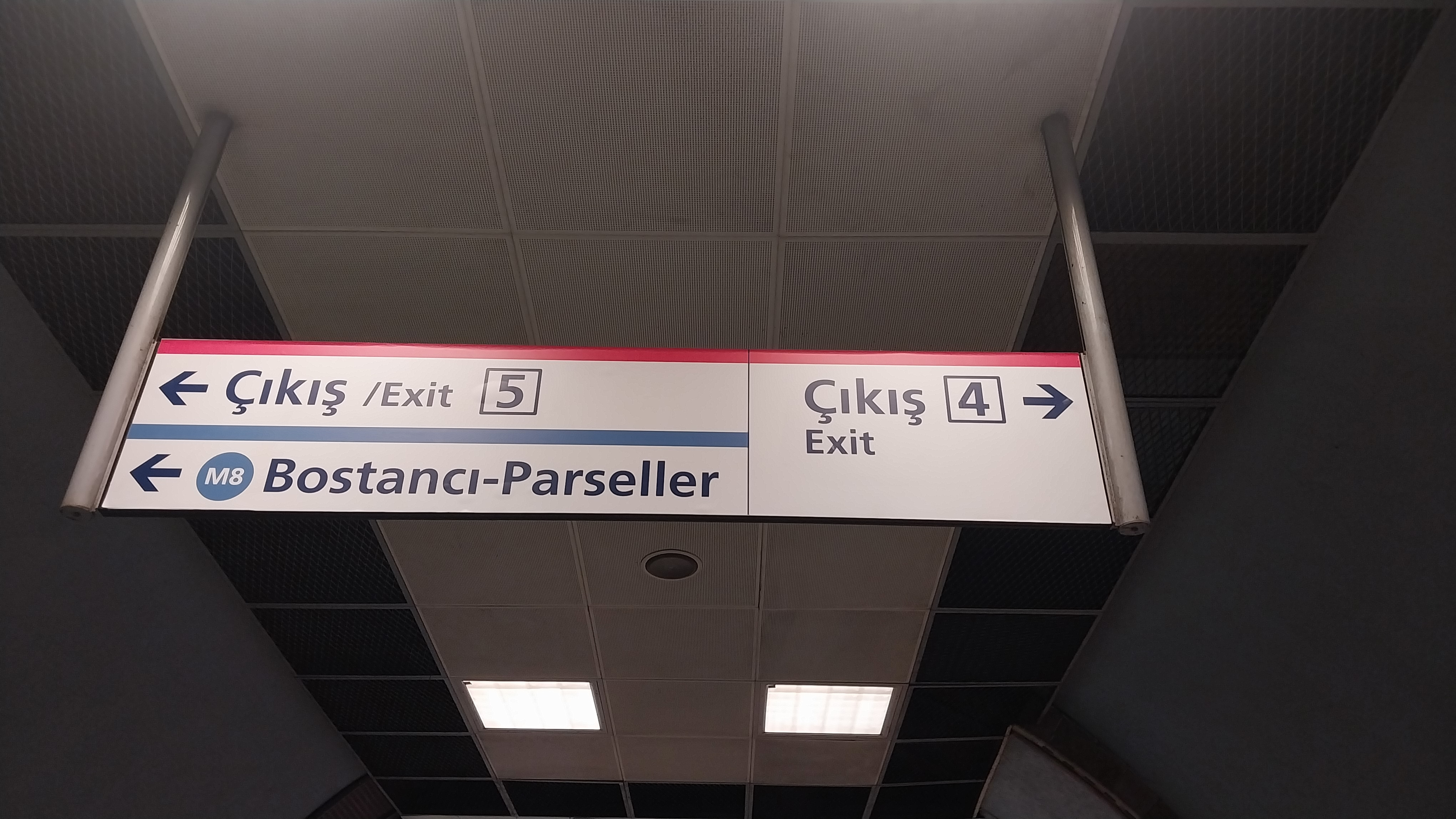
Exits 4-5 and M8 directional sign

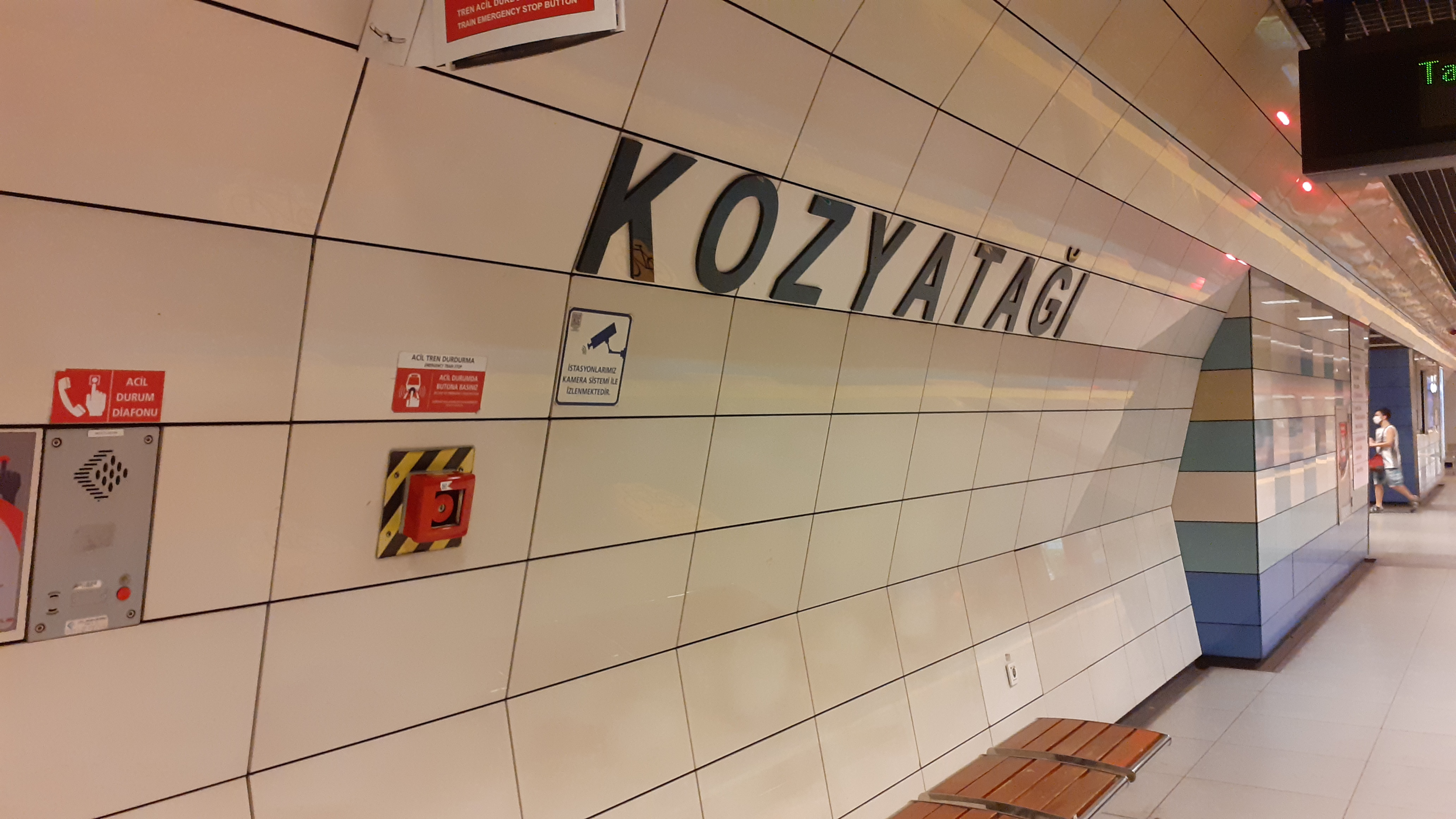
Station inscription

=== M8 ===
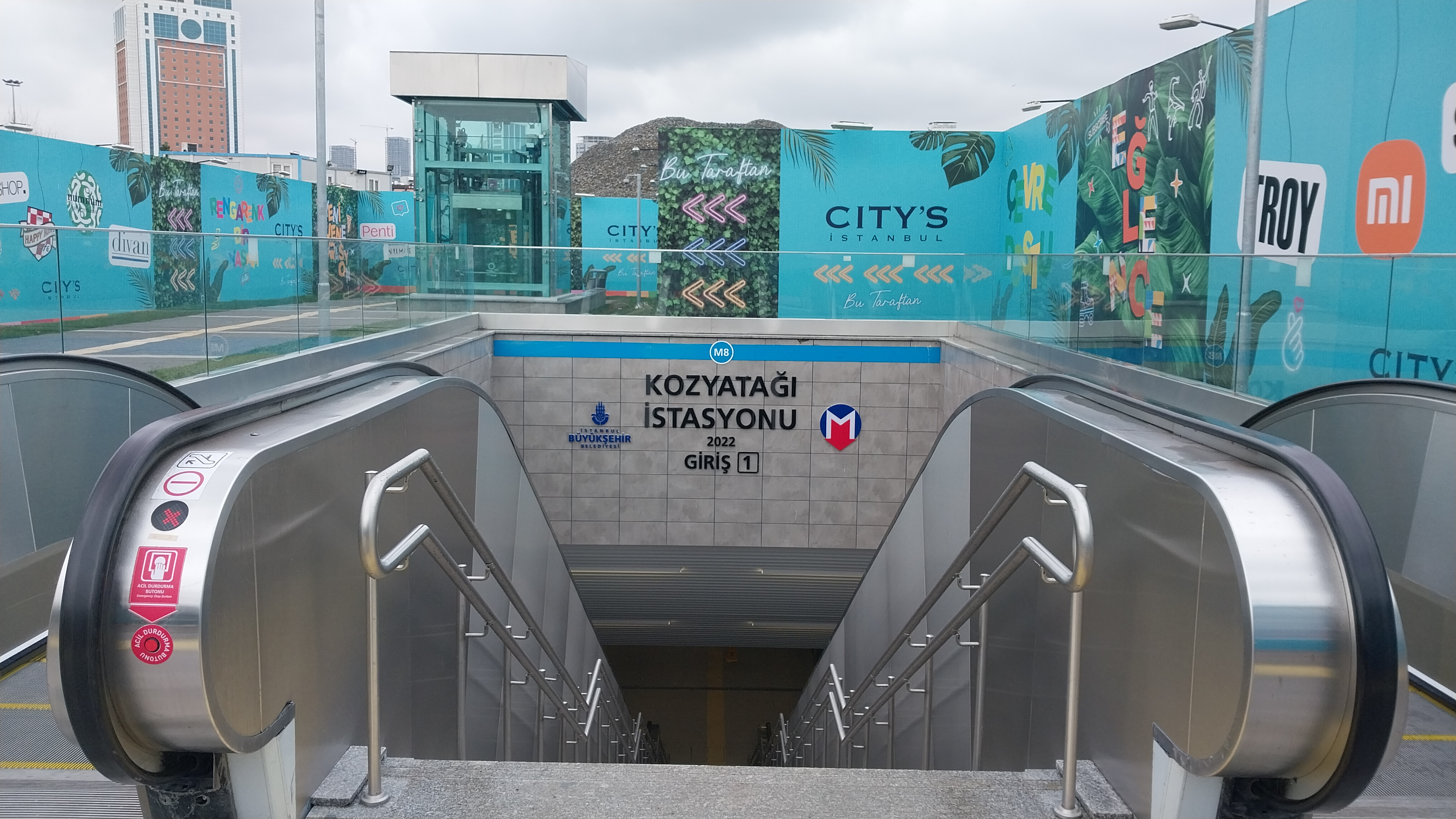
Entrance 1

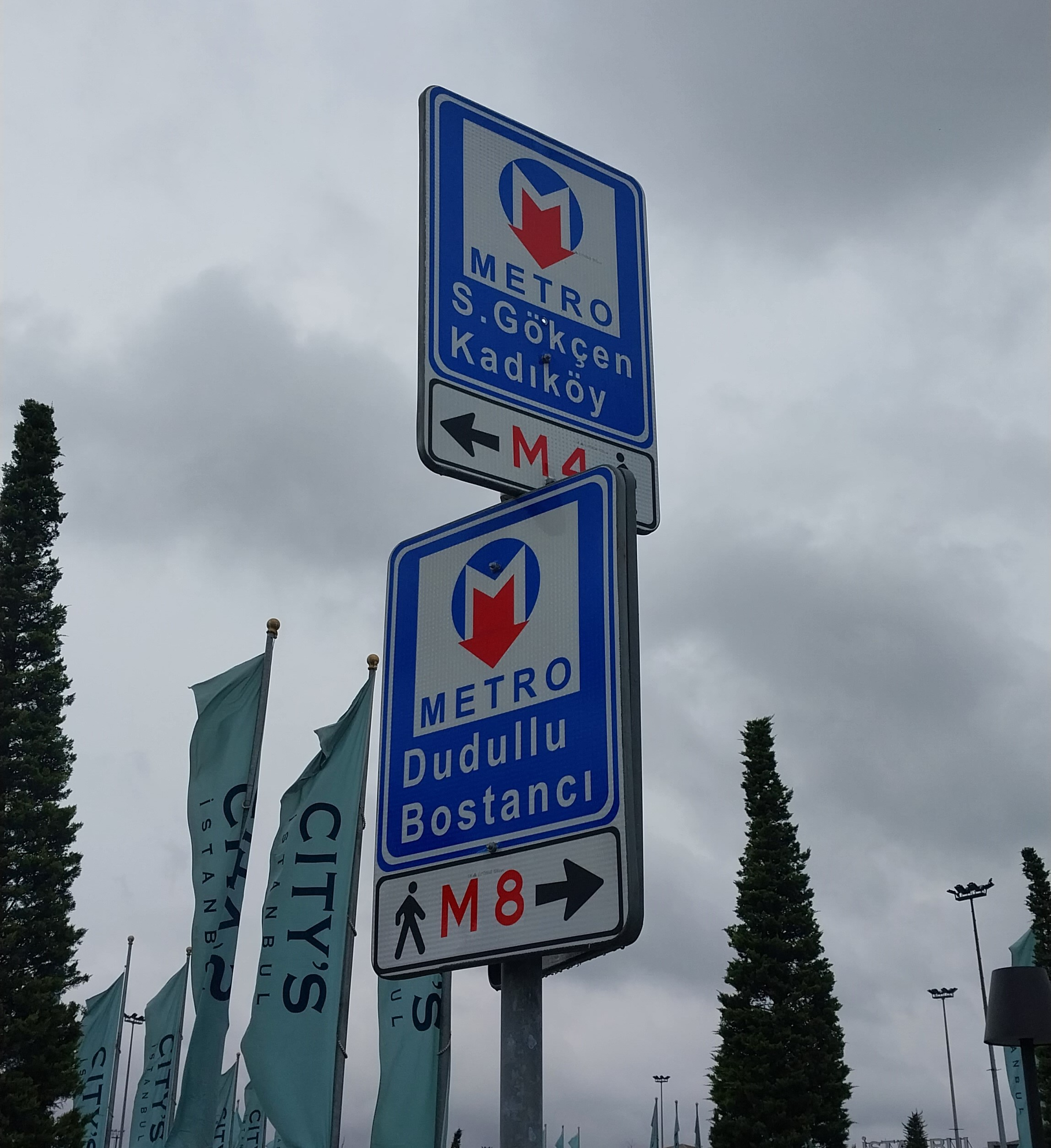
Directional Sign

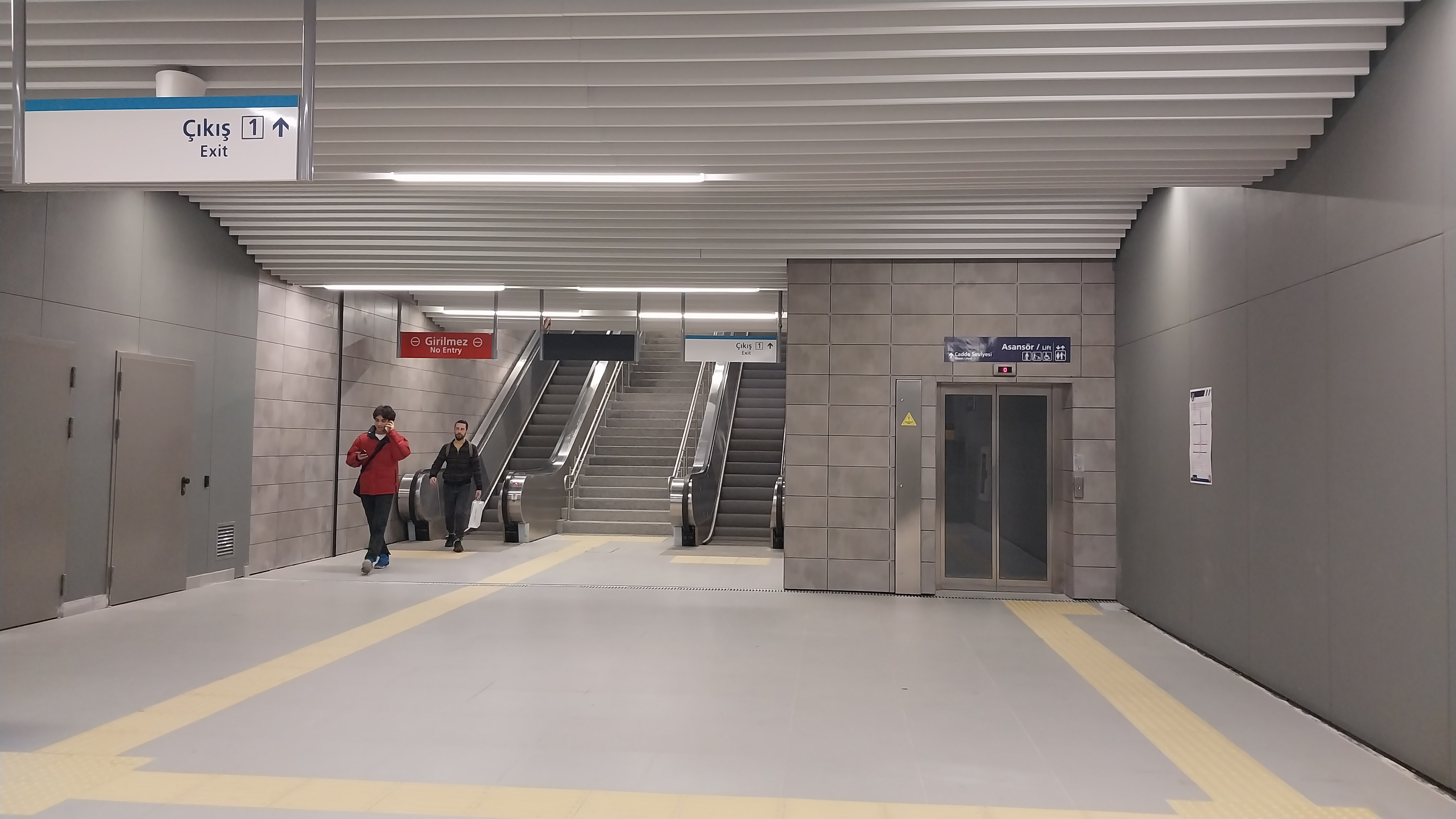
Exit 1

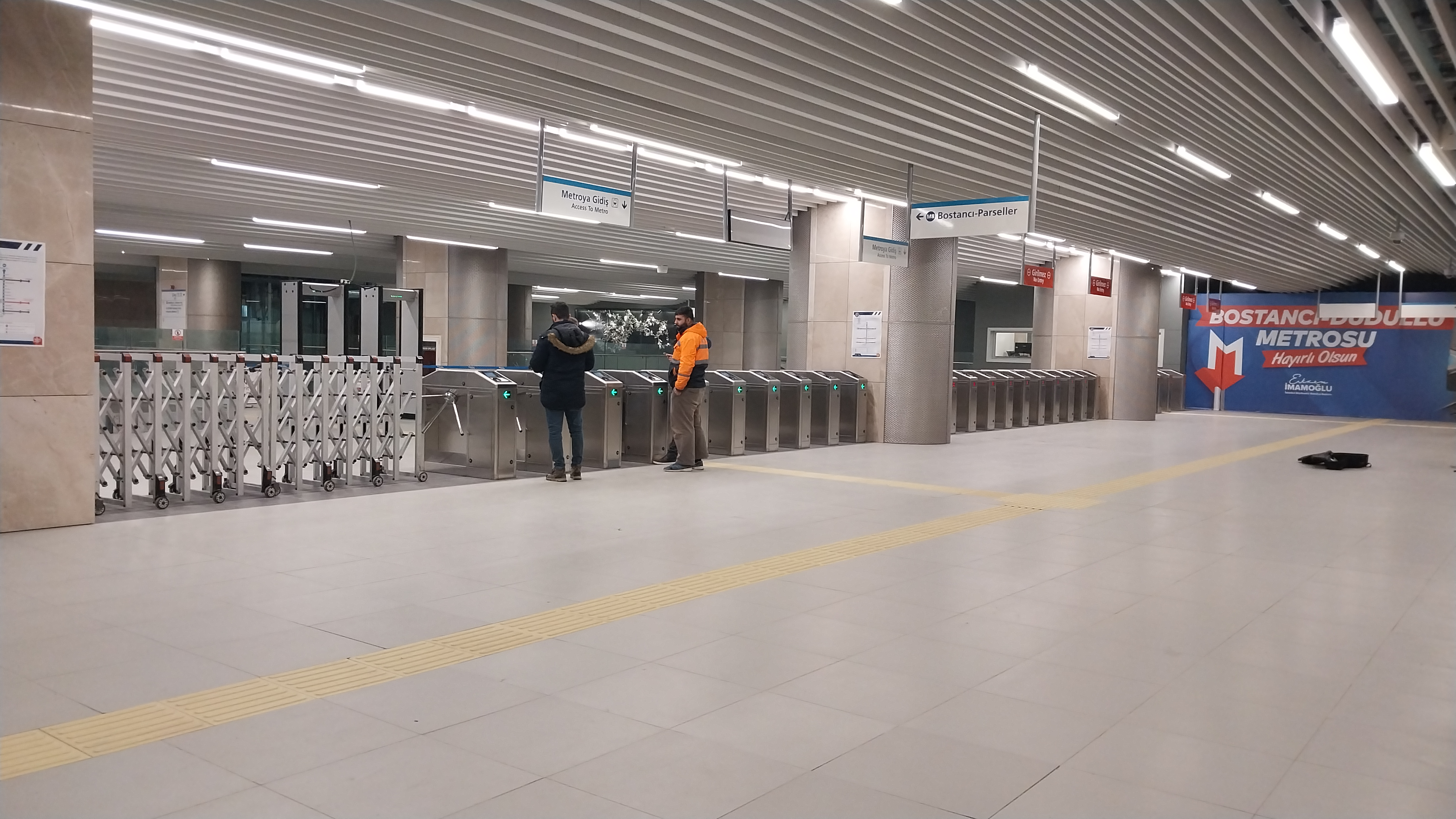
Ticket Hall

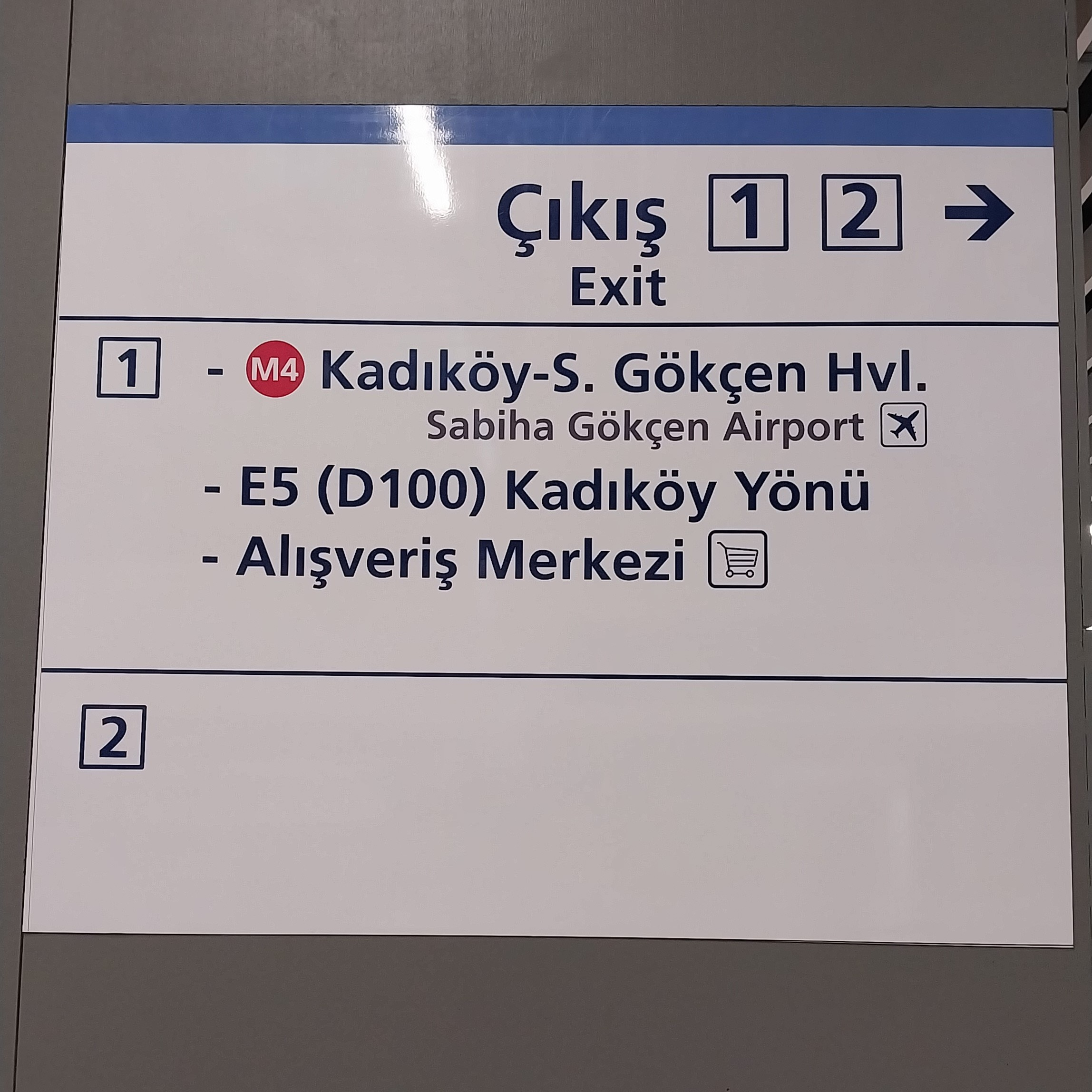
Exit List

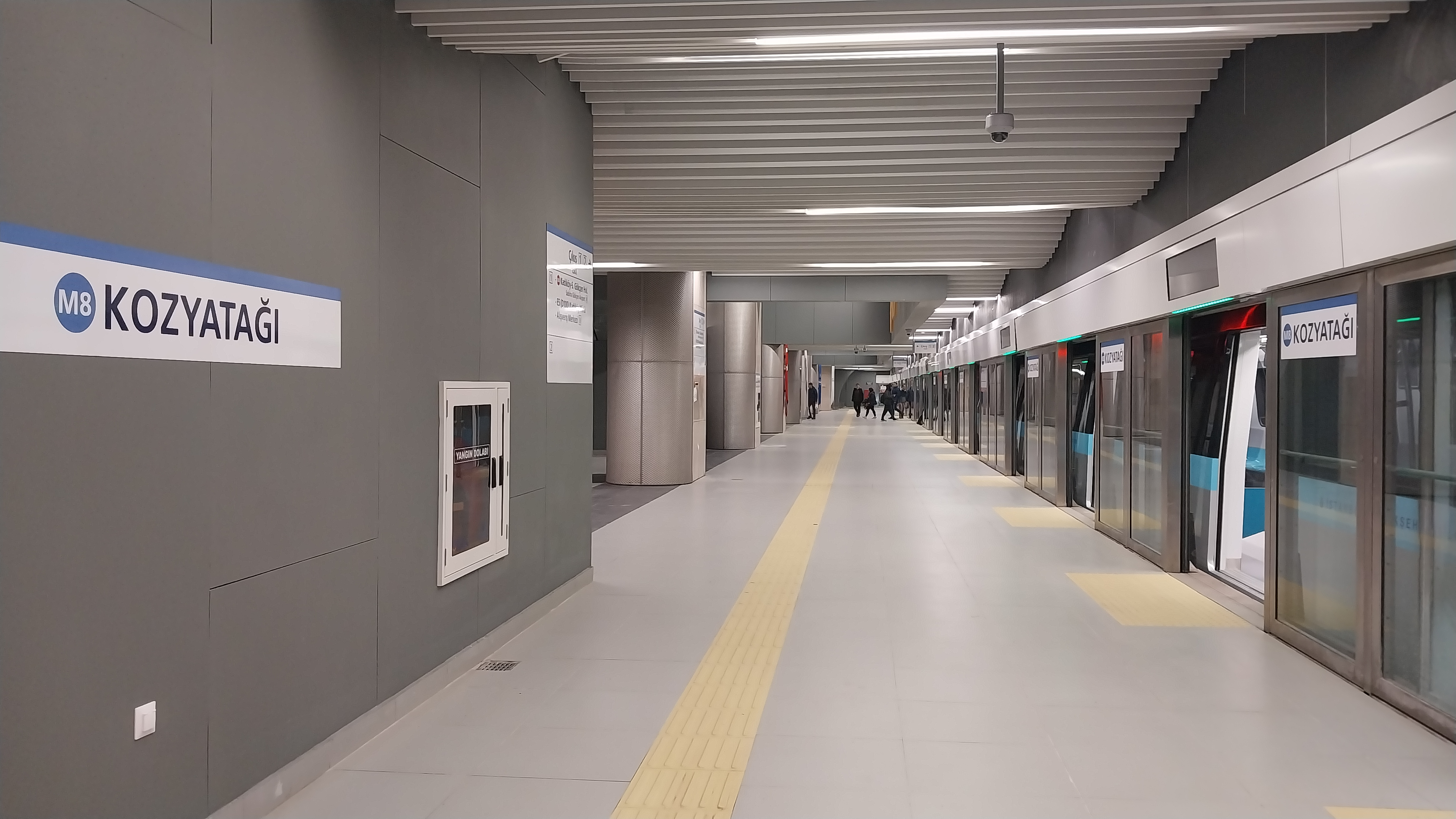
Platform in 2023

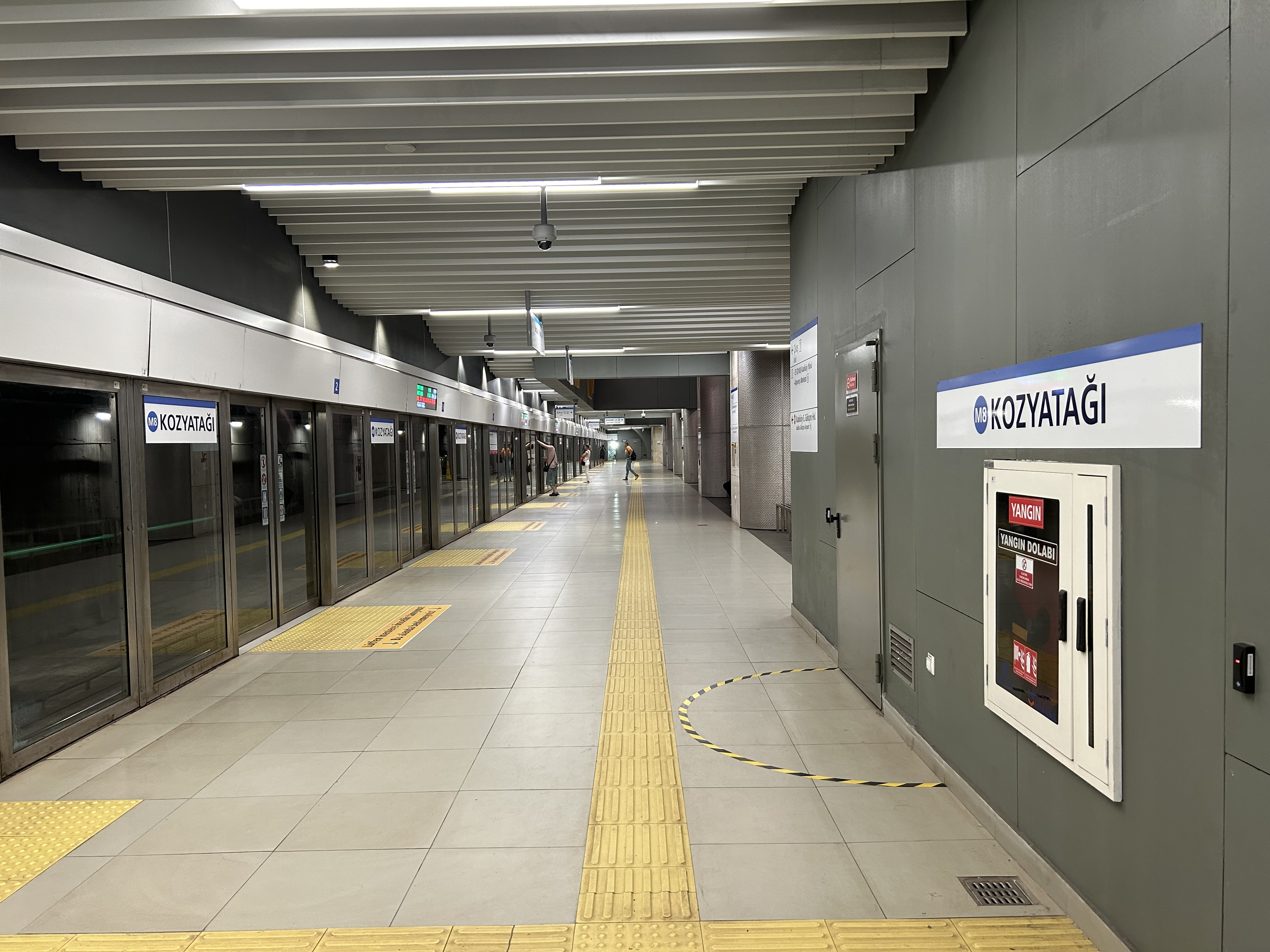
Platform in 2024
