= Küçükbakkalköy station =

Station of the Istanbul Metro

Küçükbakkalköy
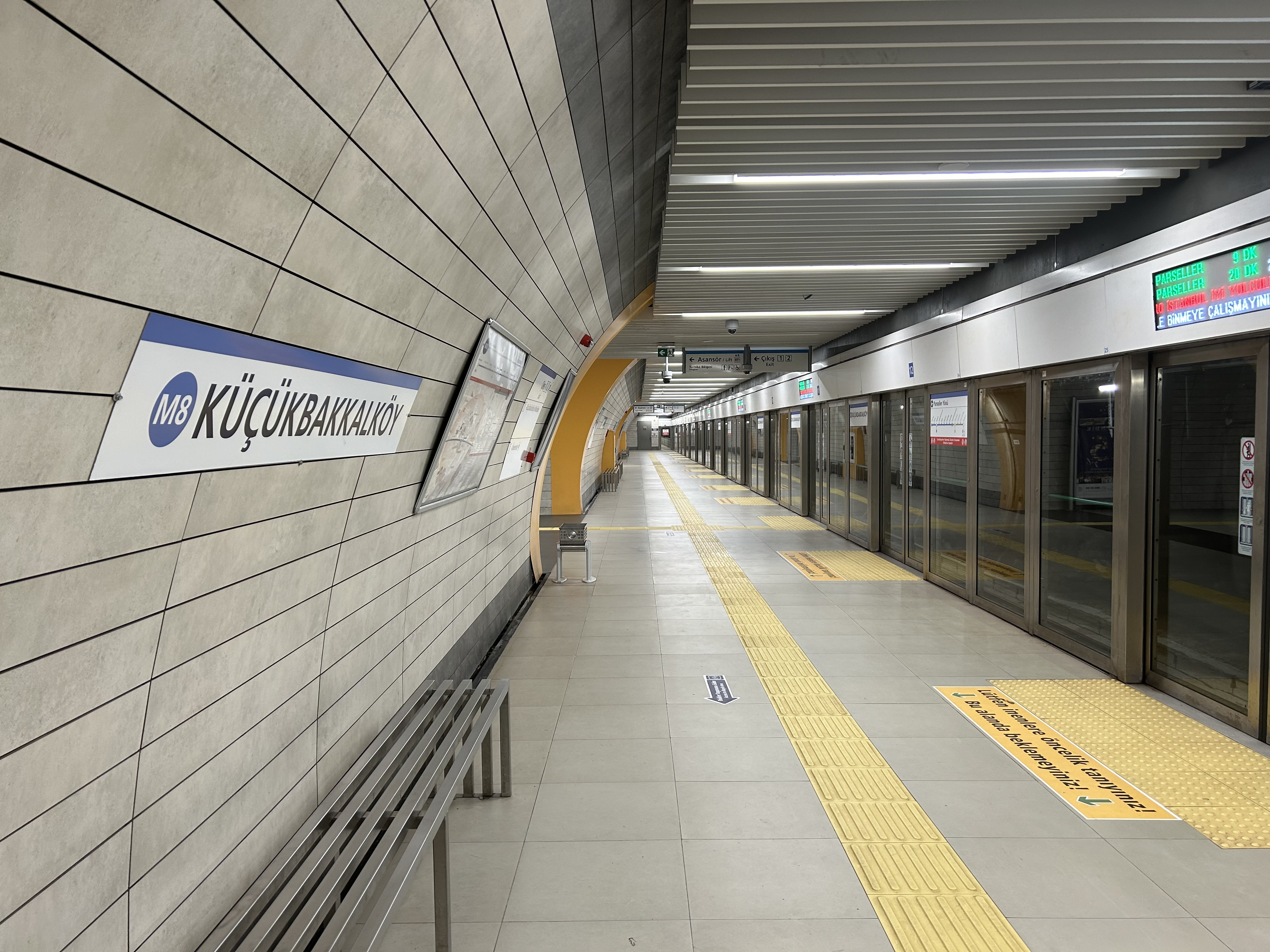
- Platform

General information
- Location: Küçükbakkalköy Neighborhood, Kayışdağı Street, 34752; Ataşehir, Istanbul; Turkey
- Coordinates: 40°58′44″N 29°6′42″E
- System: Istanbul Metro rapid transit station
- Owner: Istanbul Metropolitan Municipality
- Operator: Istanbul Metro
- Line: M8
- Platforms: 1 Island platform
- Tracks: 2
- Connections: İETT Bus: 10, 10A, 11T, 13AB, 14A, 14AK, 14CE, 14ÇK, 14S, 19ES, 19FS, 19SB, 19K, 19S, 19T, 19V, 19Y, 319, 320A, 320Y, KM46; Istanbul Minibus: Kadıköy - Ferhatpaşa, Bostancı - Dudullu, Bostancı - Kayışdağı - Dudullu, Bostancı - Tavukçu Yolu - Dudullu

Construction
- Structure type: Underground
- Parking: No
- Cycle facilities: Yes
- Accessible: Yes

History
- Opened: 6 January 2023 (3 years ago)
- Electrified: 1,500 V DC Overhead line

Services
Preceding station	Istanbul Metro	Following station
Kozyatağı towards Bostancı	M8 Line	İçerenköy towards Parseller
Location

Küçükbakkalköy is an underground station on the M8 line of the Istanbul Metro. It is located under Kayışdağı Street in the Küçükbakkalköy neighborhood of Ataşehir. It was opened on 6 January 2023.

== Station layout ==
Platform level	Southbound	← toward Bostancı (Kozyatağı)
Platform level	Island platform, doors will open on the left
Platform level	Northbound	toward Parseller (İçerenköy) →

== Operation information ==
The line operates between 06:00 and 23:00 and train frequency is 8 minutes and 40 seconds. The line has no night service.

== Gallery ==
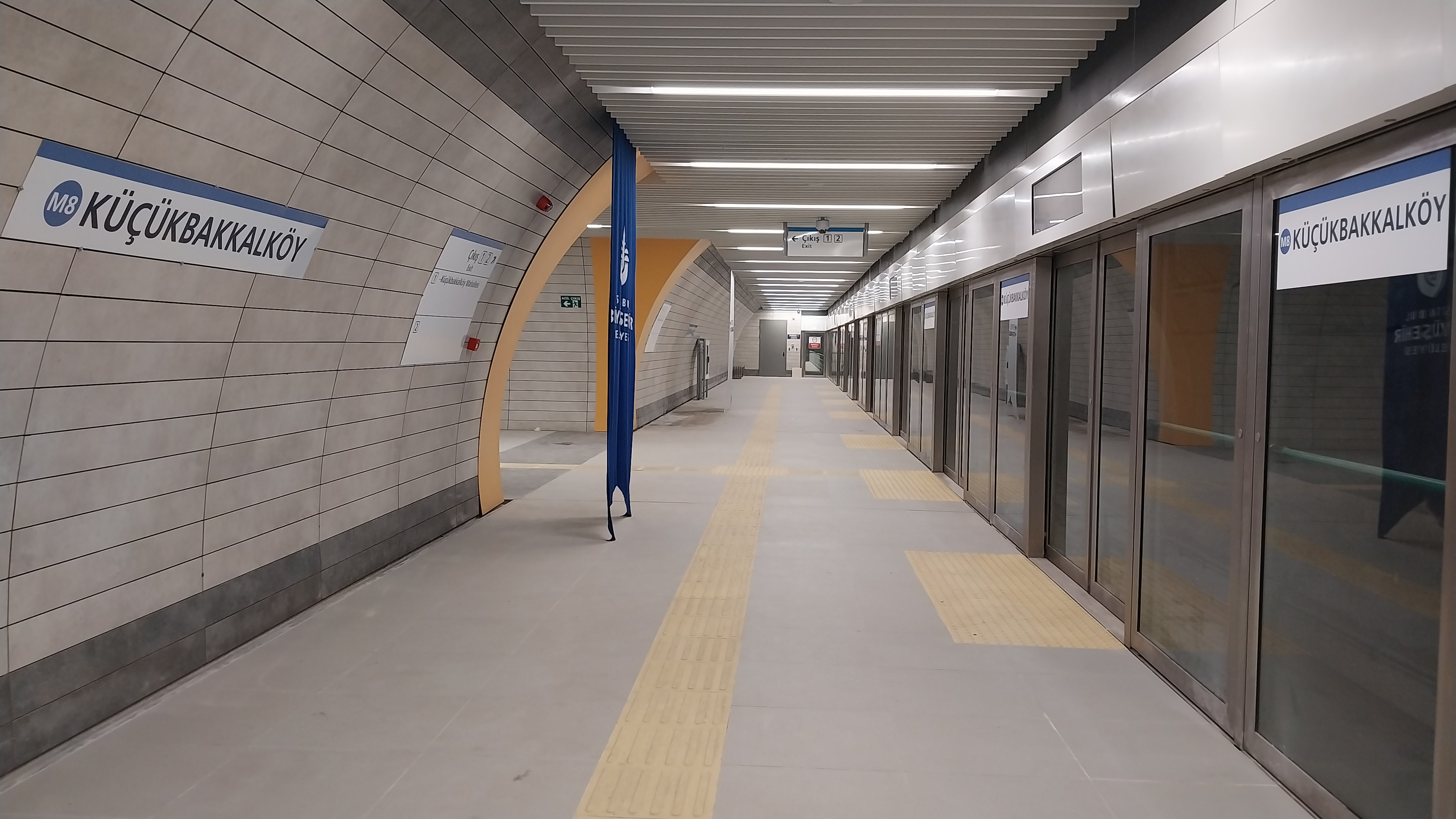
Platform
