= Emin Ali Paşa station =

Station of the Istanbul Metro

Emin Ali Paşa
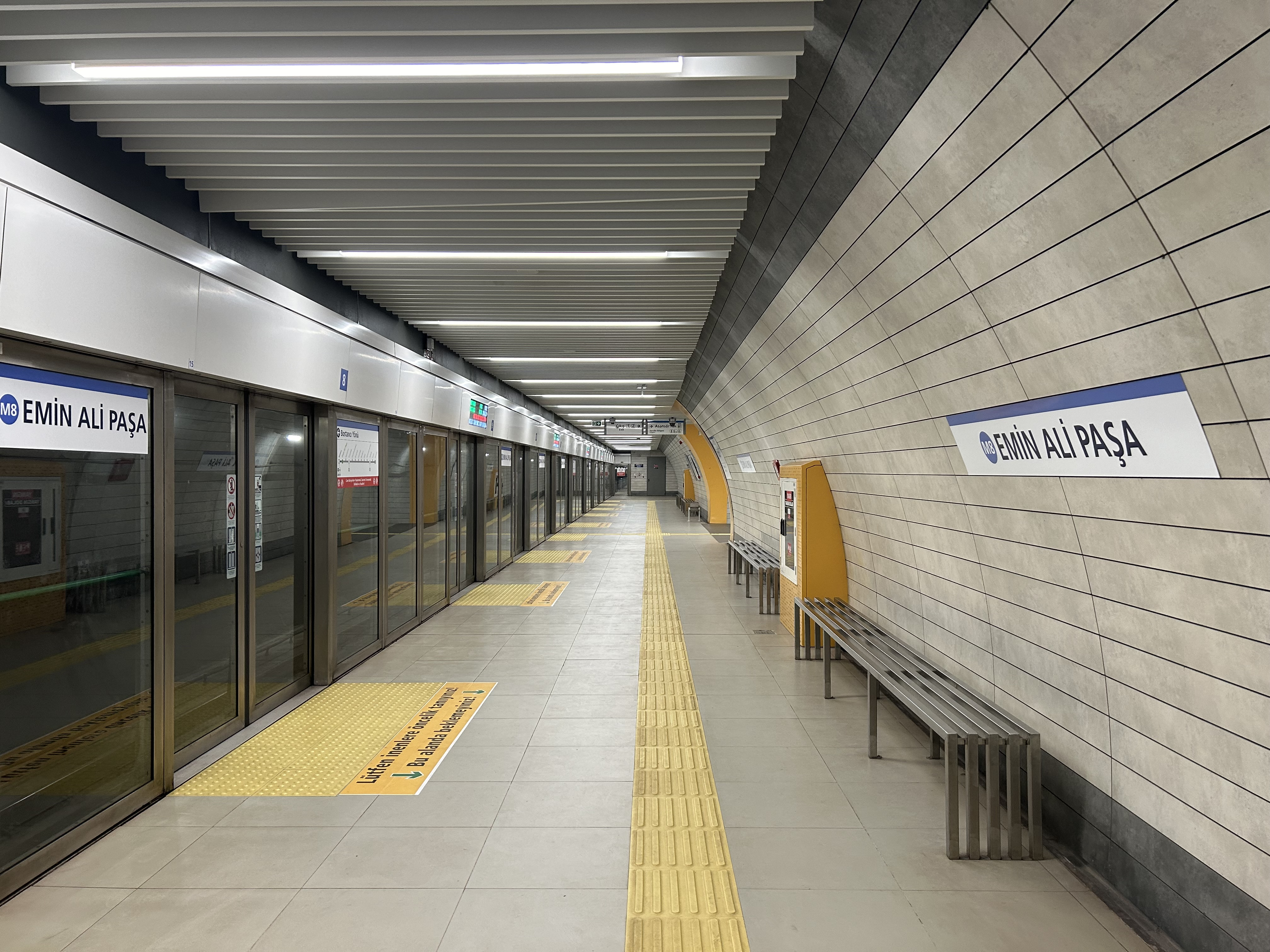
- Platform

General information
- Location: Bostancı Neighborhood, Şemsettin Günaltay Street, 34744; Kadıköy, Istanbul; Turkey
- Coordinates: 40°57′38″N 29°5′37″E
- System: Istanbul Metro rapid transit station
- Owner: Istanbul Metropolitan Municipality
- Operator: Istanbul Metro
- Line: M8
- Platforms: 1 Island platform
- Tracks: 2
- Connections: İETT Bus: 2, 17, 17L, 252; Istanbul Minibus: Kadıköy - Pendik

Construction
- Structure type: Underground
- Parking: No
- Cycle facilities: Yes
- Accessible: Yes

History
- Opened: 6 January 2023 (3 years ago)
- Electrified: 1,500 V DC Overhead line

Services
| Preceding station | Istanbul Metro | Following station |
|---|---|---|
| Bostancı Terminus | M8 Line | Ayşekadın towards Parseller |
Location

Emin Ali Paşa is an underground station on the M8 line of the Istanbul Metro. It is located under Şemsettin Günaltay Street in the Bostancı neighborhood of Kadıköy. It was opened on 6 January 2023.

== Station layout ==
| Platform level | Southbound | ← toward Bostancı (terminus) |
| Platform level | Island platform, doors will open on the left |
| Platform level | Northbound | toward Parseller (Ayşekadın) → |

== Operation information ==
The line operates between 06:00 and 23:00 and train frequency is 8 minutes and 40 seconds. The line has no night service.

== Gallery ==
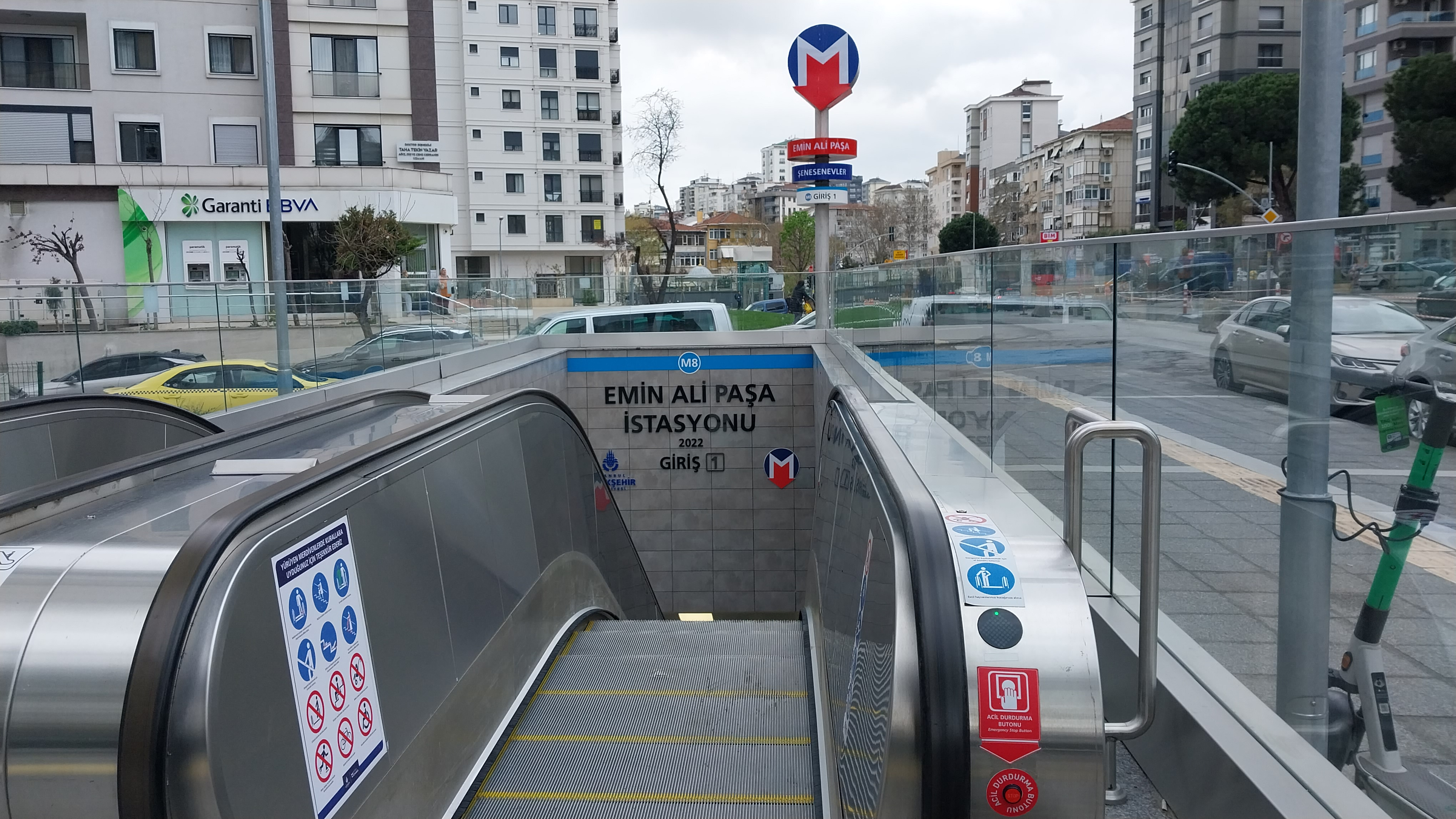
Entrance 1

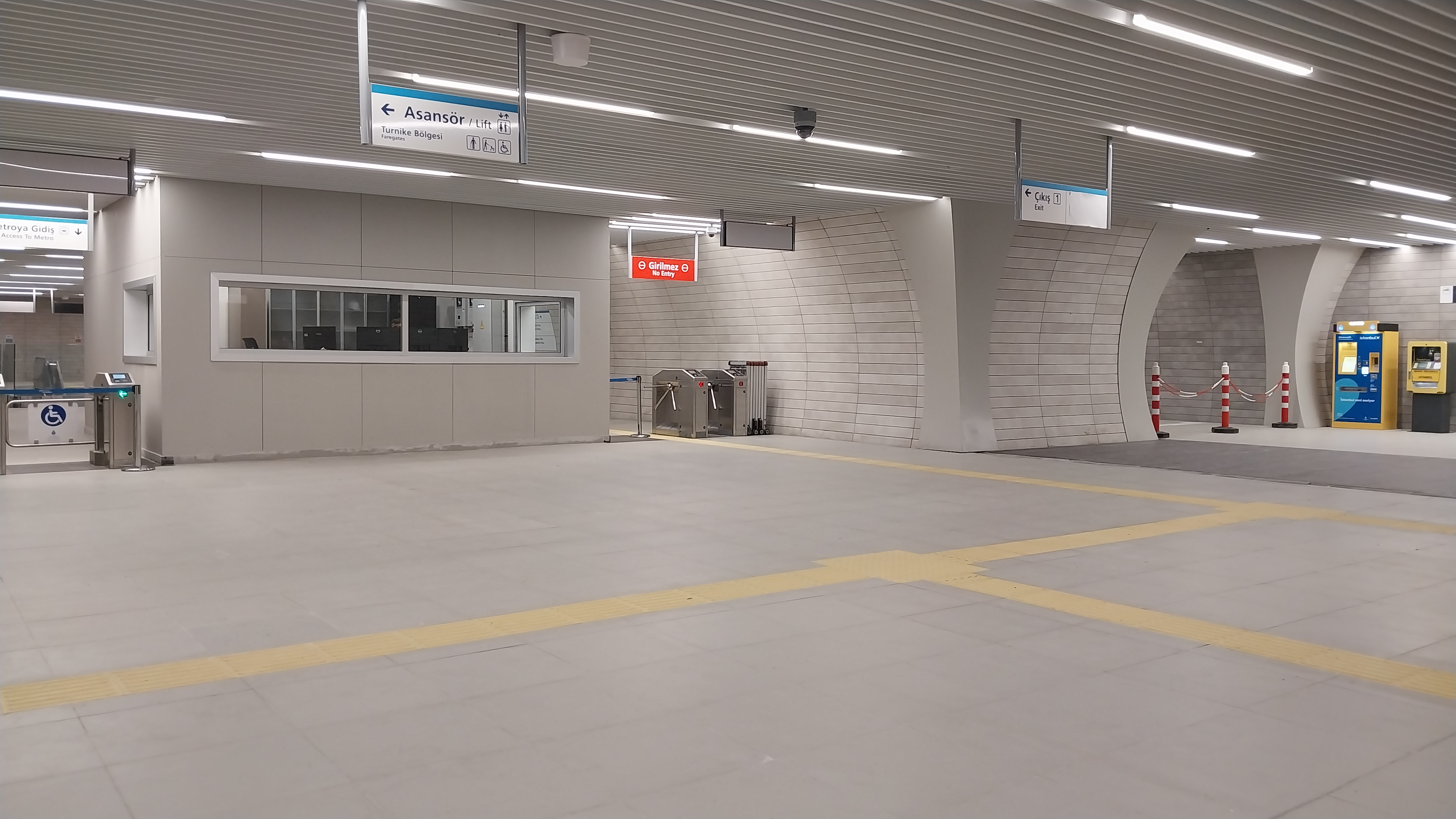
Ticket hall

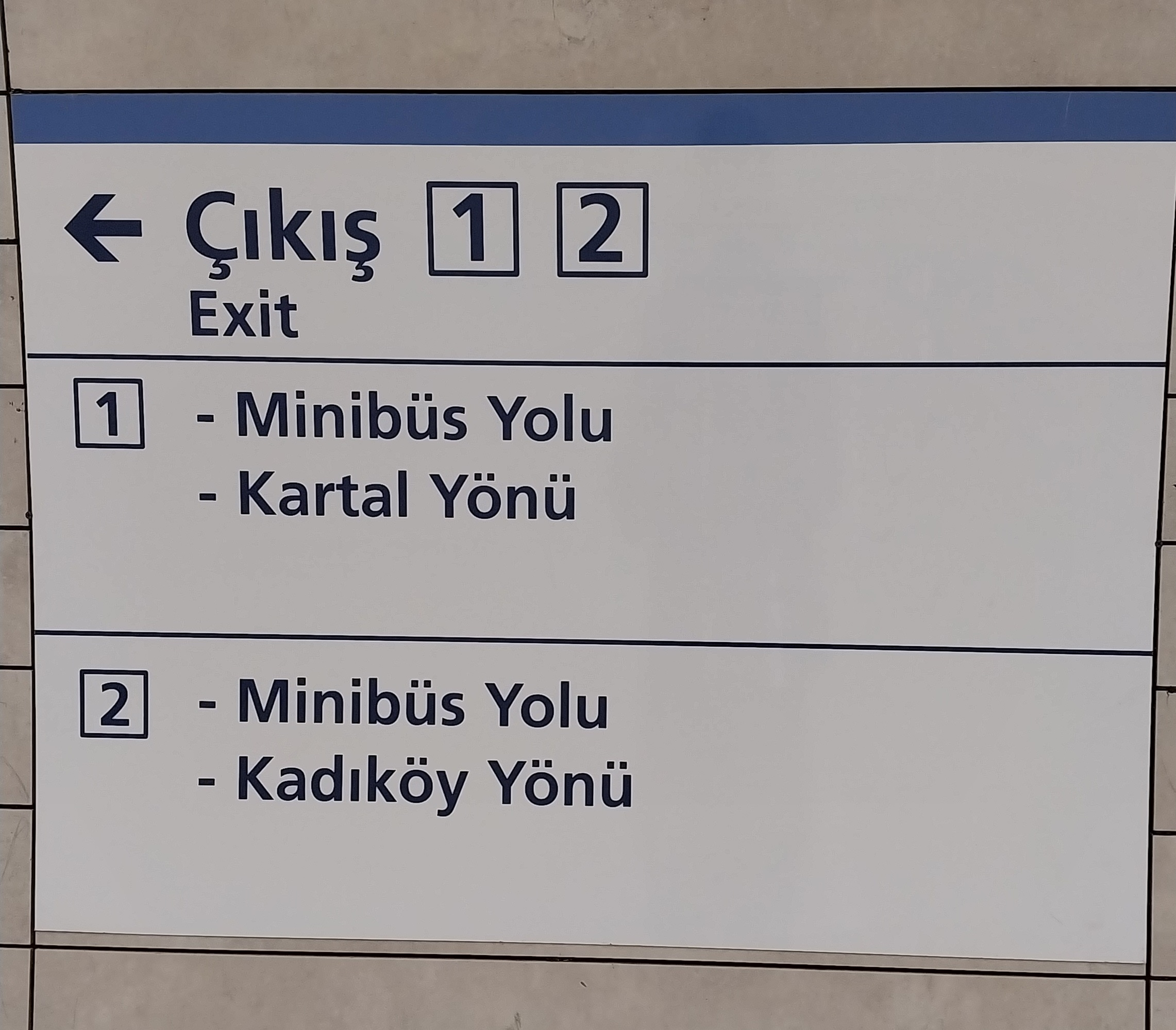
Exit list

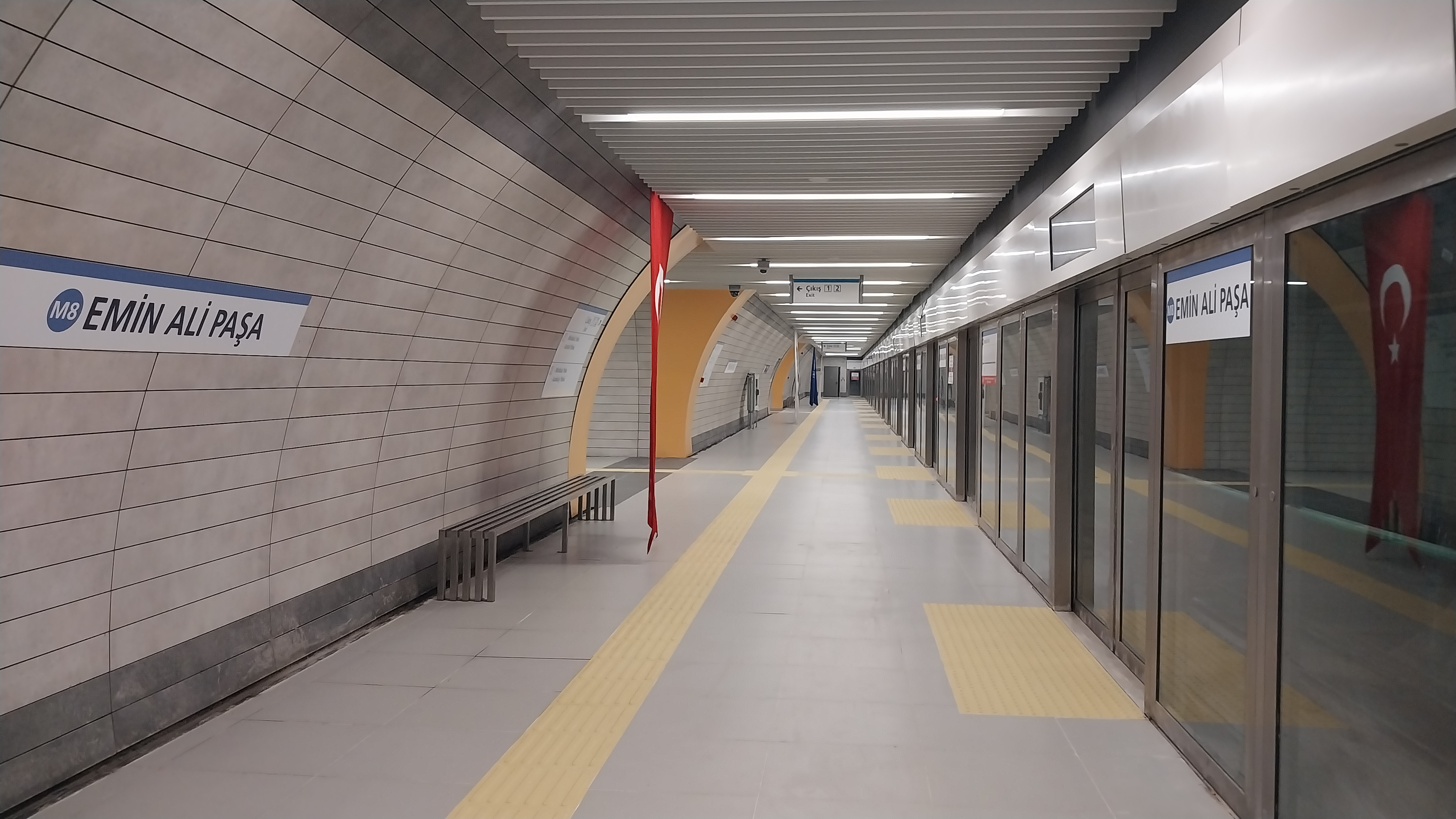
Platform
