= Bostancı station (M4) =

Station of the Istanbul Metro

Bostancı
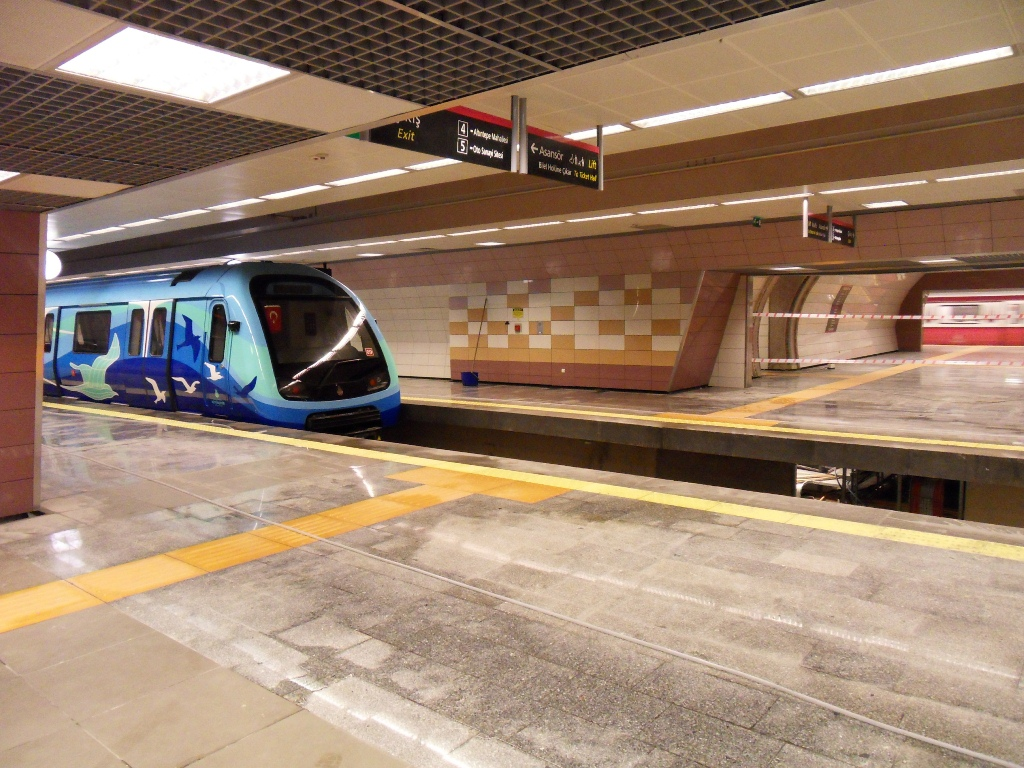
- The middle track at Bostancı station.

General information
- Location: Bostancı Kav., Bostancı Mah., 34752; Kadıköy
- Coordinates: 40.9646°N 29.1048°E
- System: Istanbul Metro rapid transit station
- Owner: Istanbul Metropolitan Municipality
- Operator: Istanbul Metro
- Line: M4
- Platforms: 2 island platforms
- Tracks: 3
- Connections: İETT Bus: 10, 13AB, 14KS, 14T, 15KB, 16A, 16B, 16C, 16F, 16KH, 16S, 16U, 16Y, 16Z, 17K, 17P, 19, 19B, 19D, 19FK, 19H, 19SB, 19Z, 21B, 21C, 21G, 21K, 21U, 129L, 130, 130A, 130Ş, 251, 319, 500T, E-10; Istanbul Minibus: Harem-Gebze, Kadıköy-Kartal, Kadıköy-Uğur Mumcu, Bostancı-Dudullu, Bostancı-Ferhatpaşa, Bostancı-Kayışdağı-Dudullu, Bostancı-Tavukçu Yolu-Dudullu, Kadıköy-Ataşehir F.M., Kadıköy-Ferhatpaşa

Construction
- Structure type: Underground
- Accessible: Yes

History
- Opened: 17 August 2012
- Electrified: 1,500 V DC Overhead line

Services
| Preceding station | Istanbul Metro | Following station |
|---|---|---|
| Kozyatağı towards Kadıköy | M4 Line | Küçükyalı towards Sabiha Gökçen Airport |
Location

Bostancı is an underground station on the M4 line of the Istanbul Metro. Located under beneath the Bostancı Interchange in the Bostancı neighborhood of Kadıköy, Istanbul, it was opened on 17 August 2012. Bostancı is the largest metro station on the M4, consisting of three tracks and two platforms. Connections to IETT bus service is available on both levels of the interchange.

The mezzanine level of the station has a total of five exits to each side of the Bostancı interchange.

== Station Layout ==
| Westbound | ← toward Kadıköy (Kozyatağı) |
Island platform, doors will open on the left, right
| | No passenger service |
Island platform, doors will open on the left, right
| Eastbound | toward Sabiha Gökçen Airport (Küçükyalı) → |
