= Bostancı station (M8) =

Station of the Istanbul Metro

Bostancı
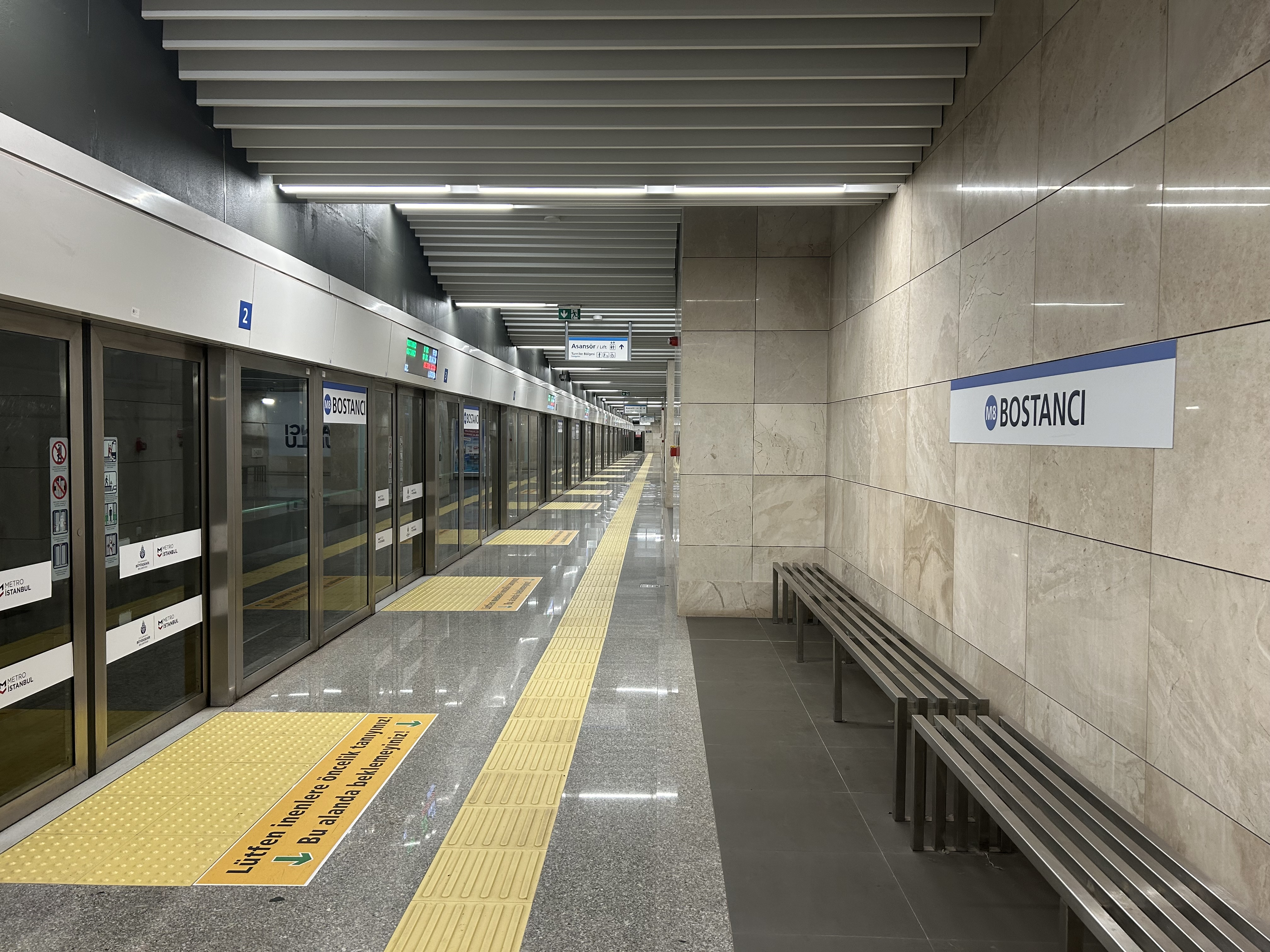
- Platform

General information
- Location: Altıntepe Neighborhood, Bağdat Street, 34840; Maltepe, Istanbul; Turkey
- Coordinates: 40°57′6″N 29°5′48″E
- System: Istanbul Metro rapid transit station
- Owner: Istanbul Metropolitan Municipality
- Operator: Istanbul Metro
- Line: M8
- Platforms: 1 Island platform
- Tracks: 2
- Connections: TCDD Transport: Marmaray and YHT at Bostancı; İDO at Bostancı Terminal; Şehir Hatları at Bostancı Pier; İETT Bus: Bostancı Pier: 4, 16, 16D, 222, E-9; Bostancı: 2, 10B, 17, 17L, 19FB, 252; Istanbul Minibus: Bostancı: Bostancı - Kadıköy (D34), Bostancı - Söğütlüçeşme Metrobüs (D38); Altbostancı: Bostancı - Pendik (D37); Üstbostancı: Bostancı - Şişli (D35), Bostancı - Taksim (D36)

Construction
- Structure type: Underground
- Parking: Yes
- Cycle facilities: Yes
- Accessible: Yes

History
- Opened: 6 January 2023 (3 years ago)
- Electrified: 1,500 V DC Overhead line

Services
Preceding station	Istanbul Metro	Following station
Terminus	M8 Line	Emin Ali Paşa towards Parseller
Location

Bostancı is an underground station on the M8 line of the Istanbul Metro. It is located under Bağdat Street in the Altıntepe neighborhood of Maltepe. It was opened on 6 January 2023, and is the southern terminus of the line. Connection to trans-Bosporus Marmaray commuter rail service and the YHT is available from Bostancı railway station as well as İDO from Bostancı Ferry Terminal, and IETT city buses and municipal ferries from Bostancı Pier.

== Station layout ==
Platform level	Southbound	← termination platform
Platform level	Island platform, doors will open on the left
Platform level	Northbound	toward Parseller (Emin Ali Paşa) →

== Operation information ==
The line operates between 06:00 and 23:00 and train frequency is 8 minutes and 40 seconds. The line has no night service.

== Gallery ==
Exit 1

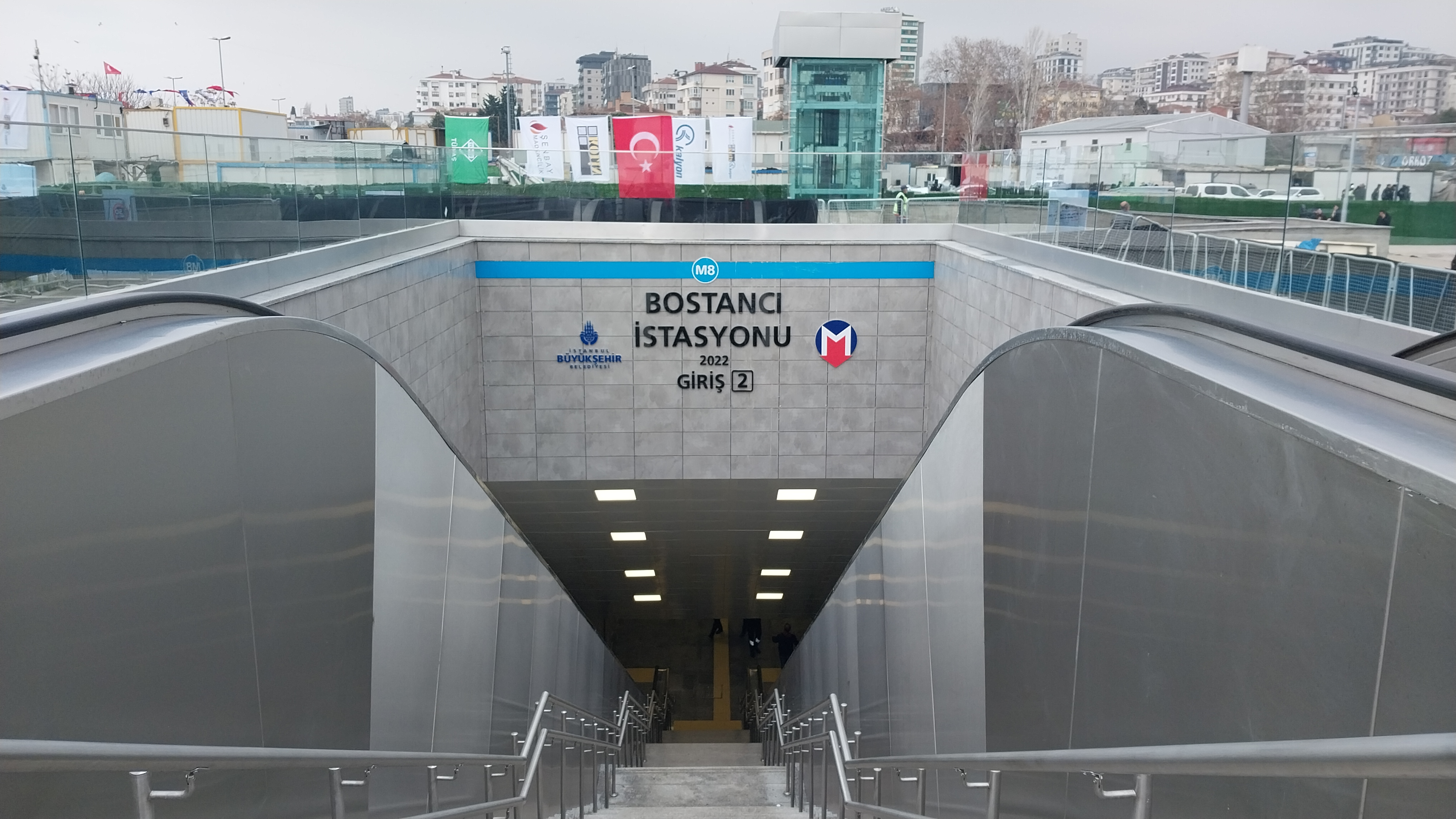
Exit 2

Exit 3

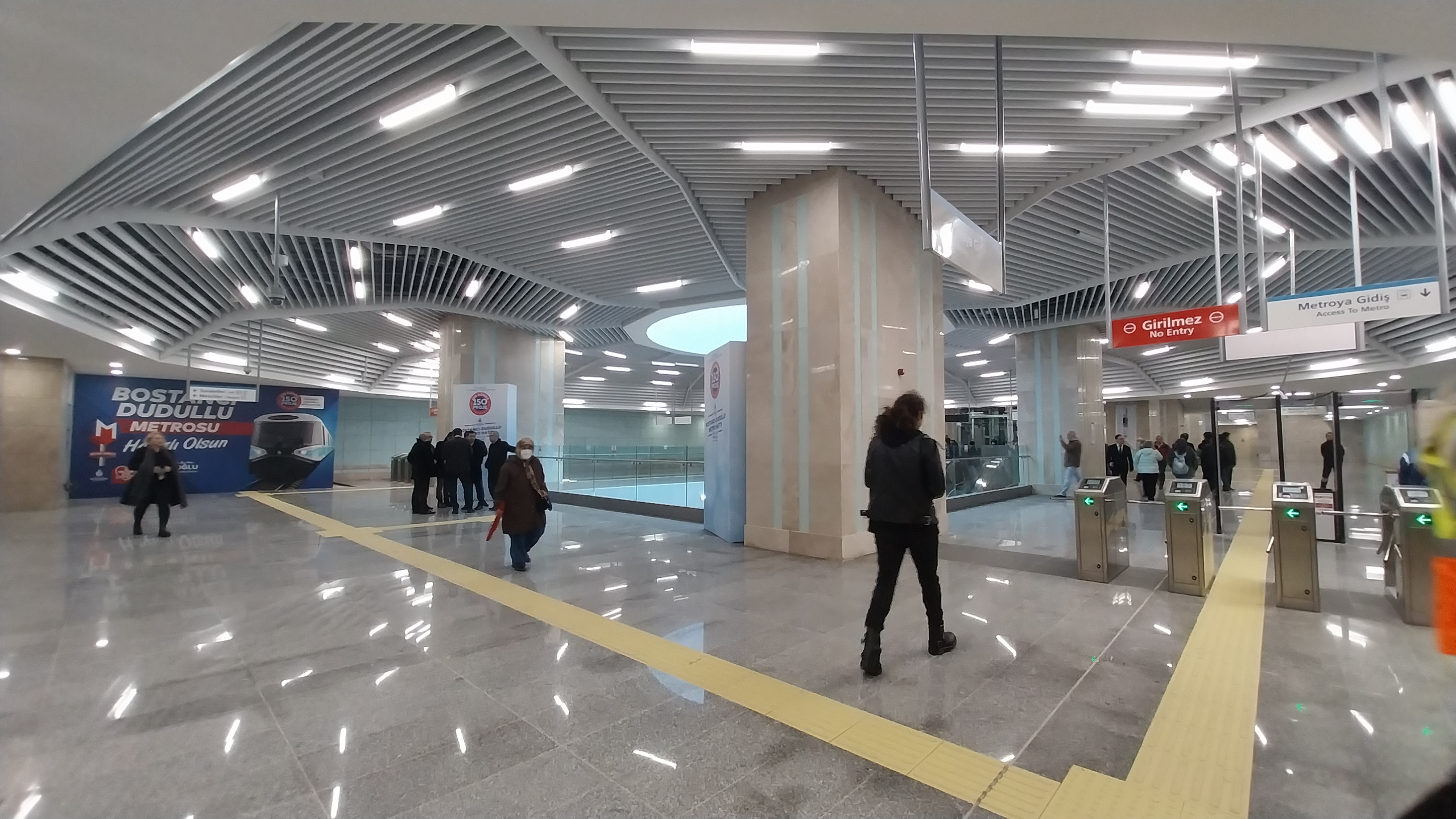
Ticket Hall

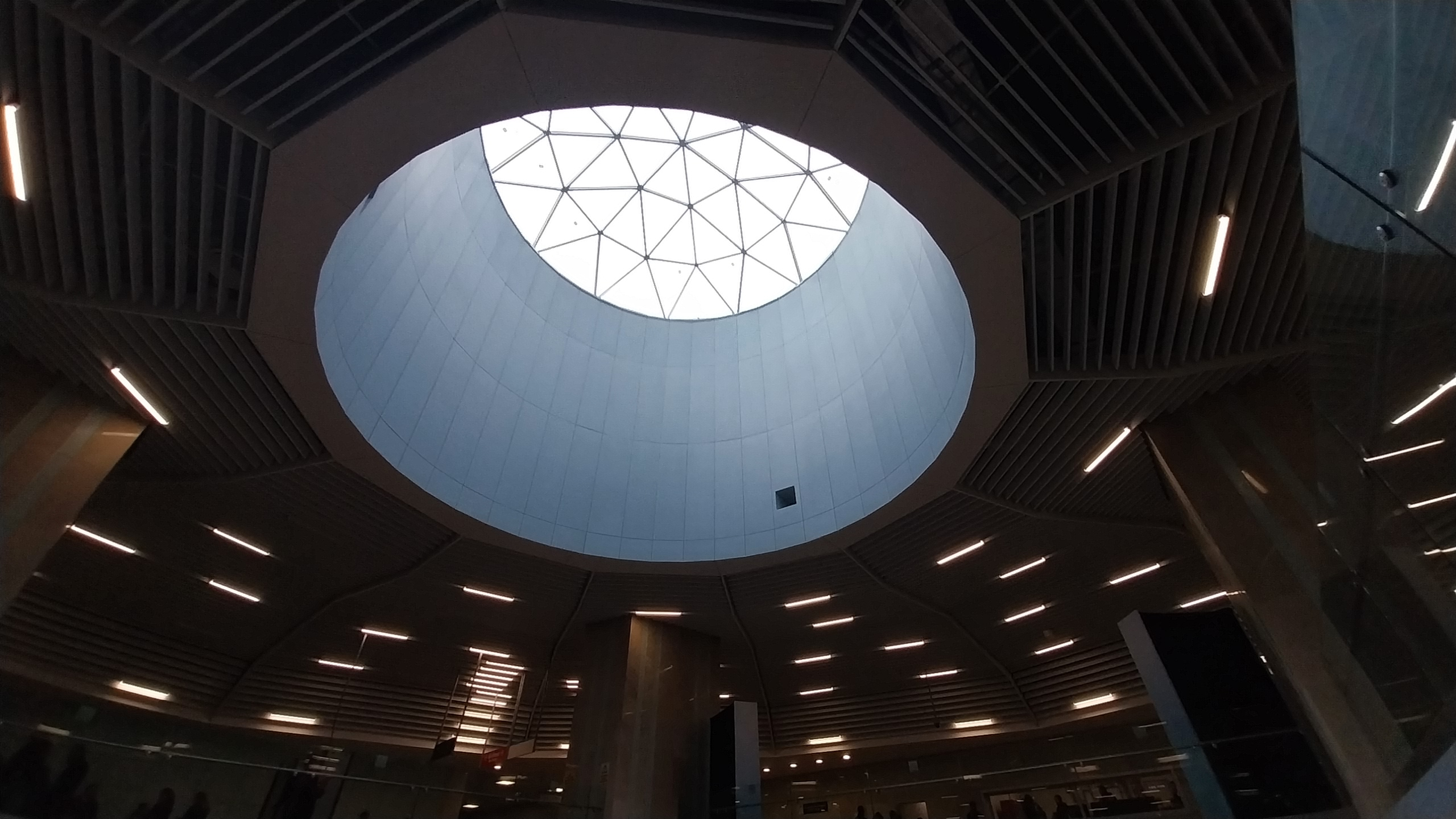
Skylight

Exit list

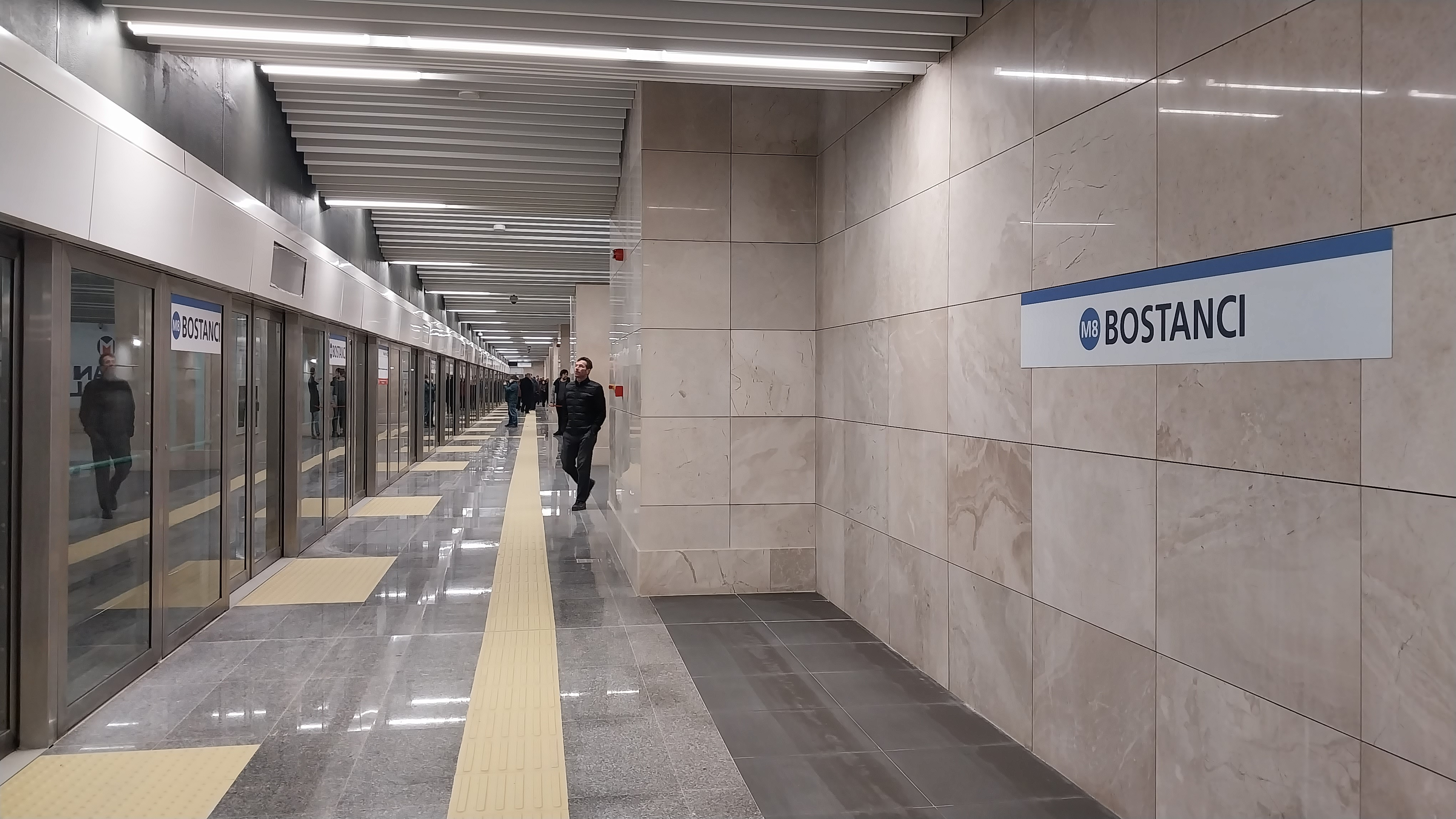
Platform

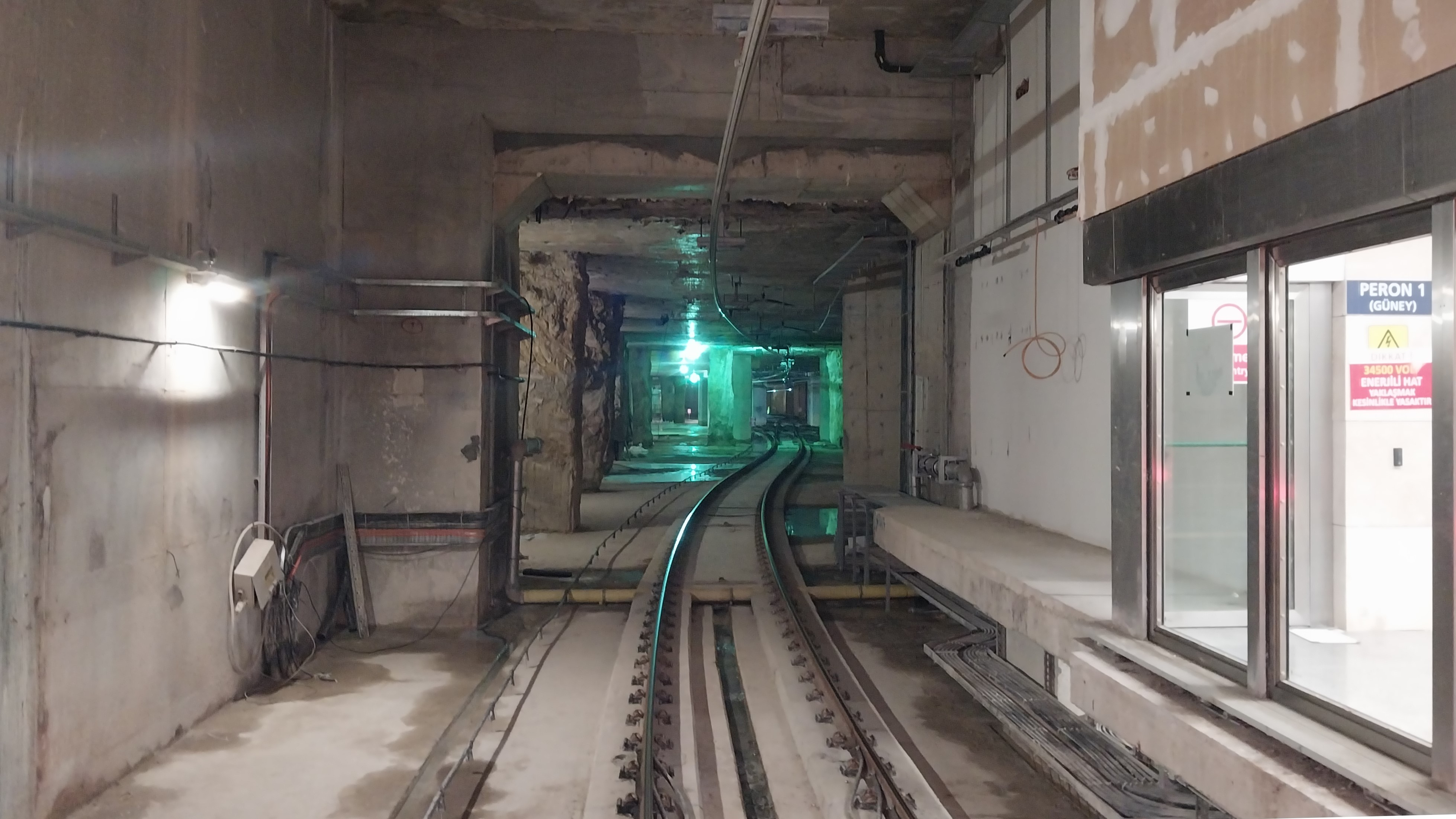
Reversing Tunnel

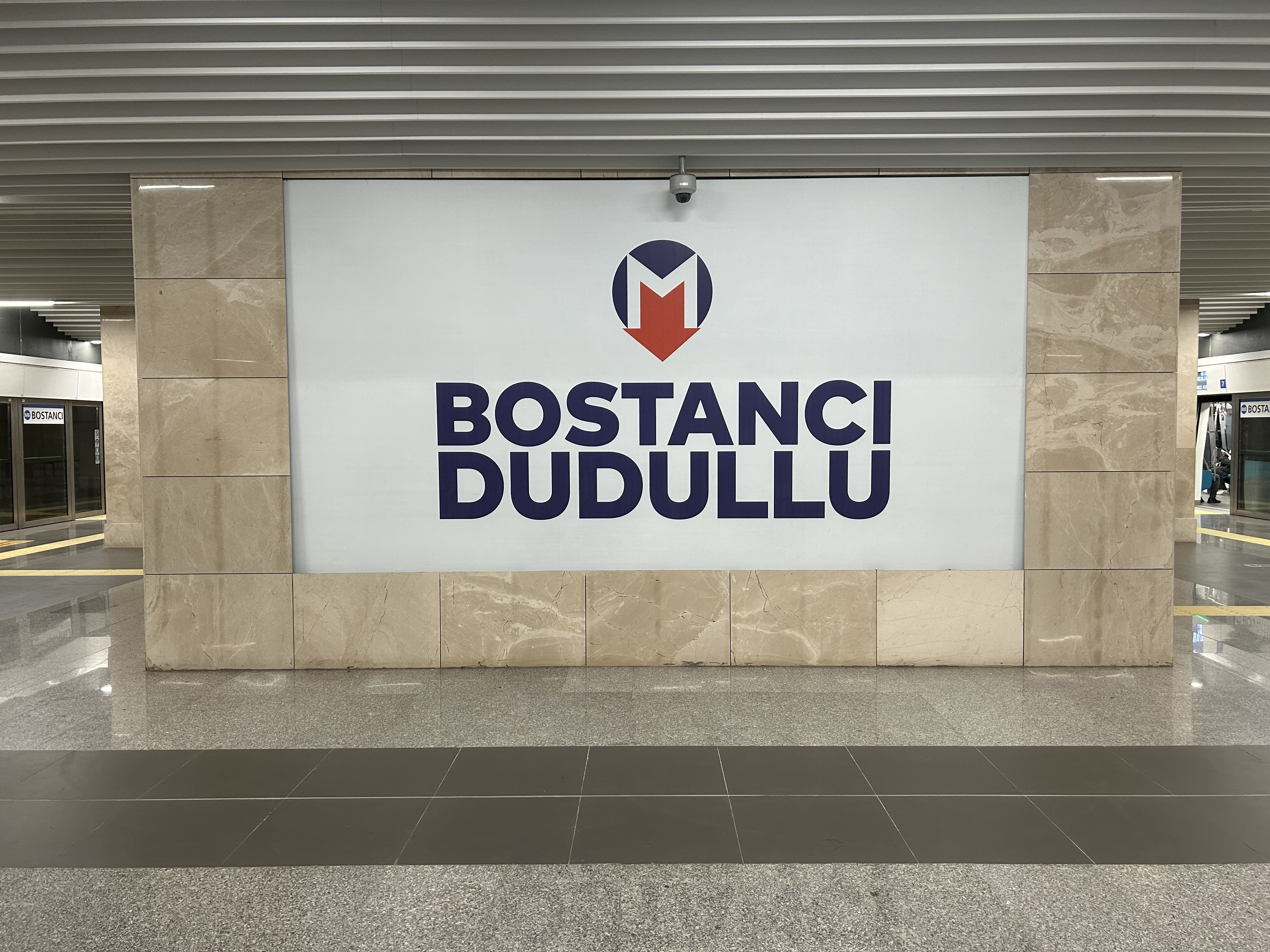
Station Banner

Station sign

Parking lot
