= Büyükbakkalköy =

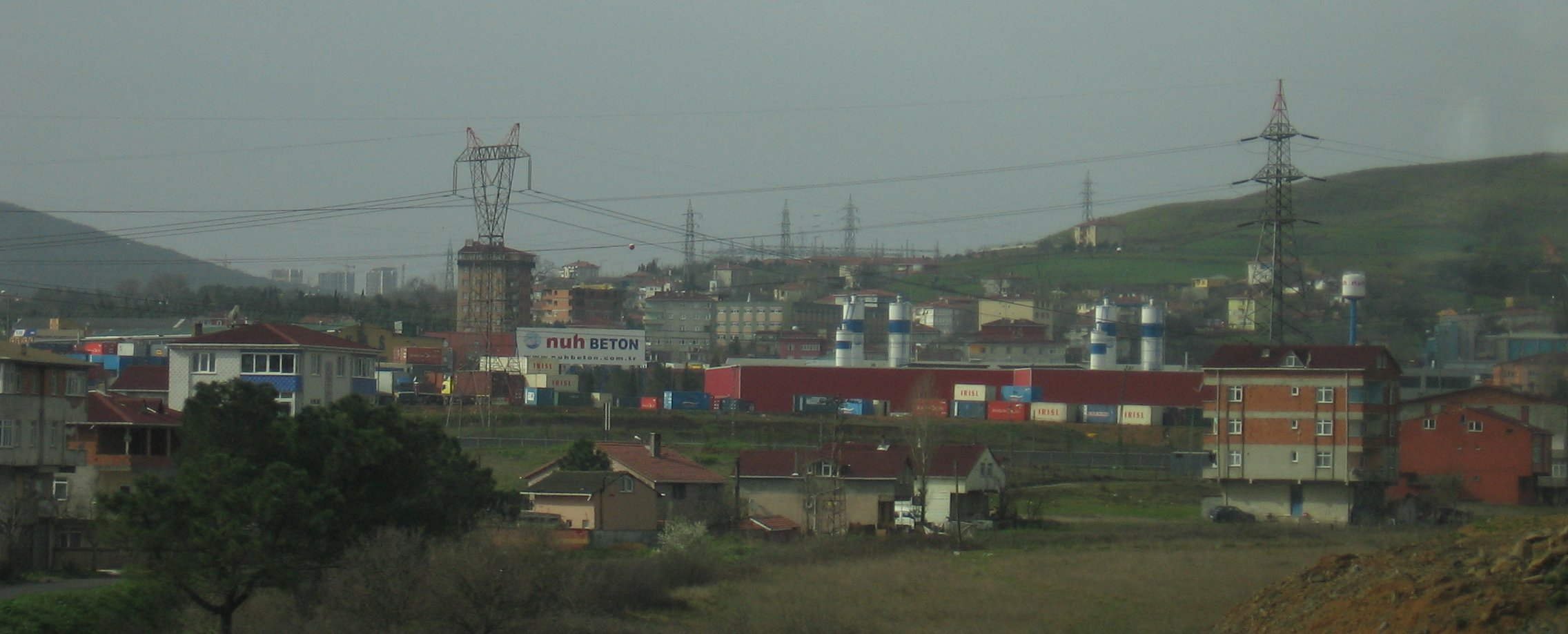
Büyükbakkalköy electrical transformer center

Büyükbakkalköy is a former Greek village of Anatolia, now a neighborhood (mahalle) in the district of Maltepe, Istanbul, Turkey.

Büyükbakkalköy is the easternmost neighborhood of Maltepe. It is bordered on the north by the Ataşehir neighborhoods of İnönü, Kayışdağı, Mimar Sinan, and Ferhatpasa; on the east by the Sancaktepe neighborhoods of Eyüp Sultan and Fatih and the Kartal neighborhoods of Yakacık Çarşı, Uğur Mumcu, and Gümüşpınar; on the south by the Kartal neighborhoods of Gümüşpınar, Soğanlık Yeni, and Cevizli; and on the west by the Maltepe neighborhoods of Cevizli, Esenkent, Gülensu, Zumrutevler, and Başıbüyük.

Its population is 7779 (2023).

== Name ==
Büyükbakkalköy literally means "large grocery village" (Turkish: büyük + bakkal + köy).

The name of the village is listed as Μεγάλου Βακάλ-κιοϊ, Mégalo-Bakal-keuy, and بيوك بقال (Büyük Bakkal) in 19th-century sources.

== Notable features ==
Notable features of Büyükbakkalköy include

- Kayış Hill (Kayış Dağı)
- Kayışdağı Forest
- Maltepe University
- Maltepe No. 1 Type L Prison
- Maltepe Juvenile Detention Center
- Maltepe Prison State Hospital
- General Nurettin Baransel Barracks
- Büyükbakkalköy Cemetery

== History ==
In late Ottoman times, Büyükbakkalköy was a Greek village first in the kaza of Üsküdar and later in the kaza of Kartal, with the villagers paying the jizya tax on non-Muslims, at least in the 1800s. The village had a large church, a holy spring (ayazma), a cemetery (meşatlık), and a Greek school, and was similar to other Greek villages in the Samandıra area, such as Paşaköy and Küçükbakkalköy.

During the Turkish War of Independence, the people of the village suffered violence. For instance, in April 1919, groups of armed bands (çete, including the Milti Kaptan Çetesi) raided and robbed the village, killed several Greeks, kidnapped others, and caused the rest of the Greeks to flee. Greek armed bands headed by Todori Gang in Şile targeted Muslims in the Büyükbakkalköy area. There were also reports of inter-Greek violence and of a raid on the village by Turkish soldiers from Maltepe.

During the 1923 population exchange between Greece and Turkey, any Greeks remaining in the village were sent to Greece, while 130 Muslims from Salonica, Langaza, and Avrathisar (in Kilkis) were settled in Büyükbakkalköy and were provided with farm animals, plows, other agricultural tools, barley, wheat, and other seeds. The newcomers often faced conflict and hardship, though, since houses and land allocated to them had sometimes been occupied earlier by opportunists or by other refugees.

The holy spring was turned into a trough for watering animals. The church was used as a military headquarters World War II, then demolished in the 1950s. At some point, all the gravestones were removed from the cemetery.

Büyükbakkalköy continued as a village in the Kartal district until the 1980 coup, when it was converted into a neighborhood of Maltepe.
