= Ferhatpaşa, Ataşehir =

Neighborhood in Istanbul, Turkey

Ferhatpaşa is a neighborhood (mahalle) in the district of Ataşehir, Istanbul, Turkey.

Ferhatpaşa is the easternmost neighborhood of Ataşehir. It is bordered on the north by the Trans-European Motorway (TEM or E80), with the Ümraniye neighborhood of Esenkent and the Sancaktepe neighborhood of Eyüp Sultan on the other side of the motorway; on the southeast and south by the Sancaktepe neighborhood of Eyüp Sultan and the Maltepe neighborhood of Büyükbakkalköy; and on the west by the Ataşehir neighborhoods of Mimar Sinan and Yeni Çamlıca.

Its population is 21,160 (2022).

In the 1920s, this area was the Ferhatpaşa Farm (çiftlik). In the 1980s, settlement in the area began. In 2008, Ferhatpaşa was separated from the belde of Samandıra and attached to the newly established municipality (belediye) of Ataşehir.
