= Paşaköy, Sancaktepe =

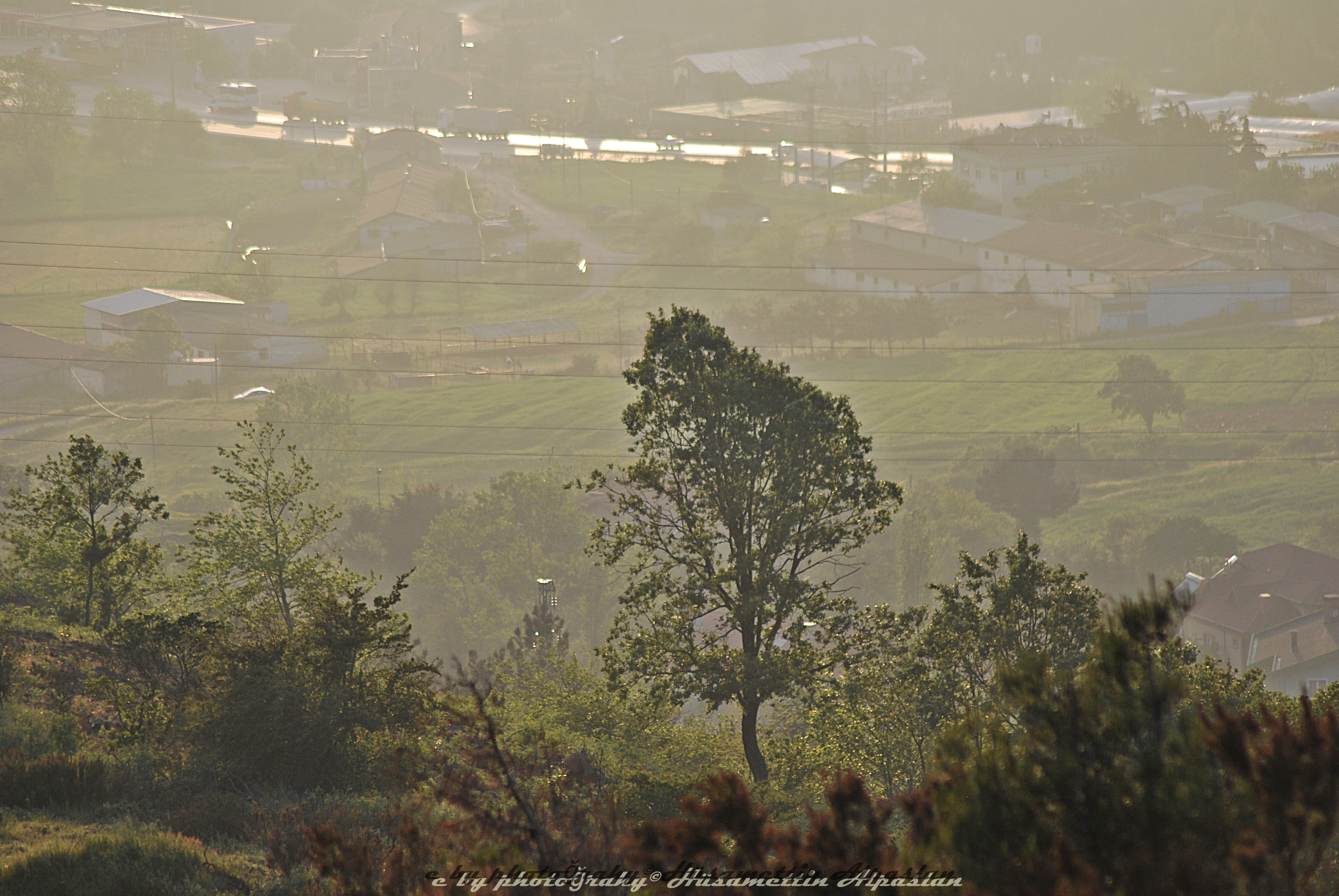
Paşaköy

Paşaköy is a former Greek village in Anatolia, now a neighborhood (mahalle) in the district of Sancaktepe, Istanbul, Turkey.

Its population is 1,708 (2020). Its surface area is 2,557.4203 hectares. The area includes much agricultural and forest land, but is undergoing rapid urbanization.

It is bordered on the north by the Alemdağ Forest and the Çekmeköy neighborhood of Ömerli; on the east by Lake Ömerli and the Pendik neighborhood of Kurtdoğmuş; on the south by Lake Ömerli and the Pendik neighborhood of Kurtdoğmuş and then by the Sultanbeyli neighborhood of Mimar Sinan; and on the west by the Sancaktepe neighborhoods of Mevlana and Hilal and the Çekmeköy neighborhood of Nişantepe.

== Notable features ==
Notable features of Paşaköy include

- the Paşaköy Greek Cave, reportedly used by Greek armed bands (çete) and bandits (eşkıya) during the Turkish War of Independence
- the Paşaköy Wastewater Treatment Plants
- Lake Ömerli, the reservoir behind Ömerli Dam
- the Sefer Usta Mansion, an abandoned house partially submerged in Lake Ömerli

== History ==
In the Ottoman era, Paşaköy was a Greek village, similar to Büyükbakkalköy and Küçükbakkalköy.

During the Turkish War of Independence, the people of the village suffered violence. For example, in April 1919, armed bands kidnapped people from Paşaköy and forced the rest of the villagers to flee; in the same month, again a band raided the village, robbed and beat the people, and kidnapped them. In September 1919, a Paşaköy notable, Dem. Parnjis, was founded murdered; because of the murder and frequent raids, those remaining in the village fled.

During the 1923 Population Exchange between Greece and Turkey, 349 Muslims from Greece were settled in Paşaköy.
