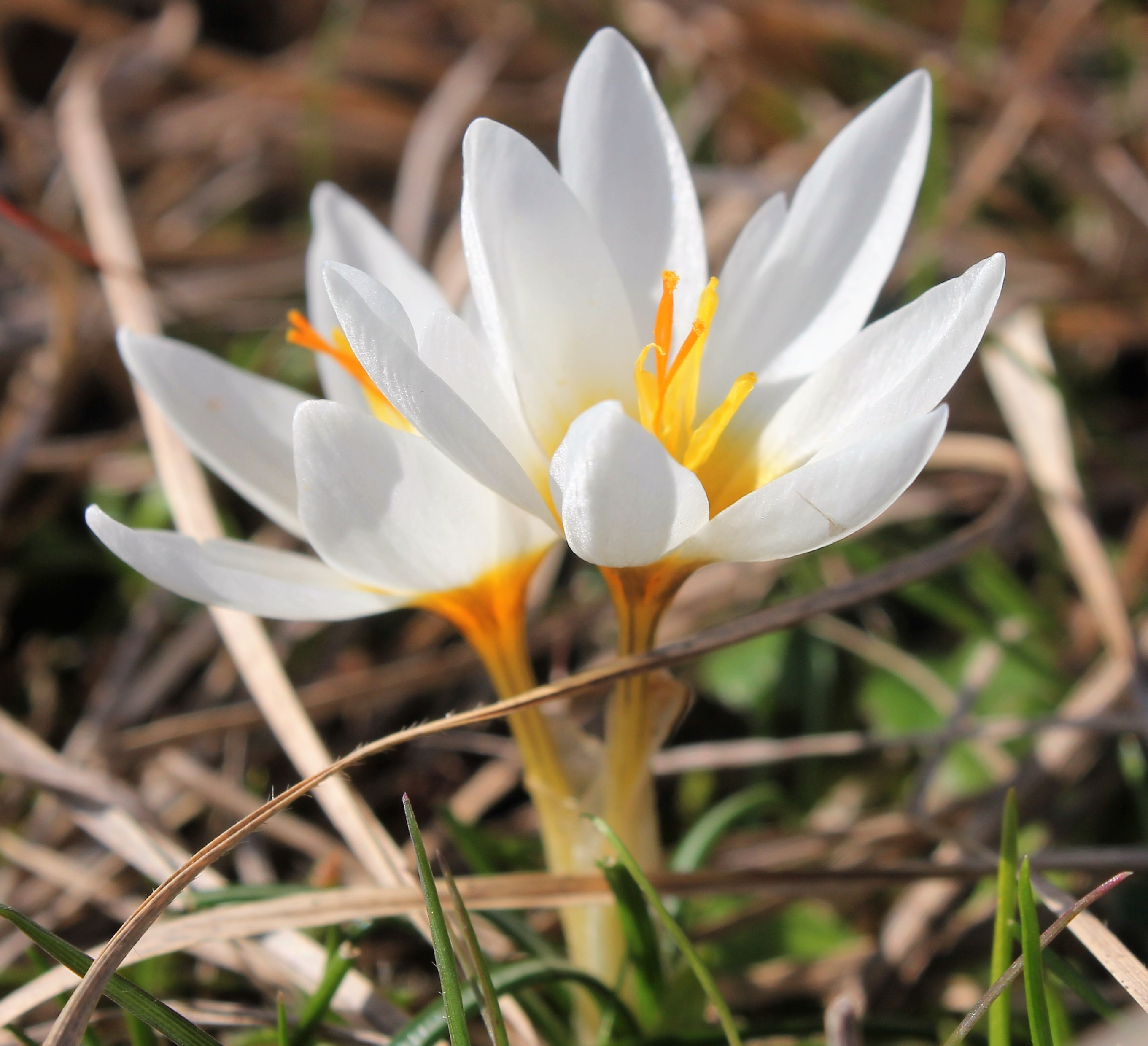
- Crocus pestalozzae

Scientific classification
- Kingdom: Plantae
- Clade: Tracheophytes
- Clade: Angiosperms
- Clade: Monocots
- Order: Asparagales
- Family: Iridaceae
- Genus: Crocus
- Species: C. pestalozzae

Binomial name
- Crocus pestalozzae Boiss.

= Crocus pestalozzae =

Species of flowering plant

Crocus pestalozzae is a species of flowering plant in the genus Crocus of the family Iridaceae. It is a cormous perennial native to Turkey.

Native to both the Asian and European sides of the Bosphorus, growing in fields and on hills below 200 meters of elevation, flowering occurs in January to March.

== Description ==
The base of the filaments of the stamens have small black spots. which are a characteristic feature of the species. There are 3 to 6 leaves, which are 0.5 to 1.5 mm wide. The throat of the perianth is yellow, glabrous or spicate; the section of the perianth is 1.5 to 2.5 cm long and 0.4 to 0.8 cm wide, blunt, or almost pointed, white or purple. The filament is 3 to 6 mm long, yellow in color and black at the base, and the head is 6 to 7 mm long and yellow. The neck is divided into 3 thin orange branches. Blooms in January, February, and March. Tuber about 1.5 to 2.5 × 1.2 to 2.5 cm, tuber membranous or thin, brown, divided at base into horizontal tissue rings (divided). Leaves 3–6, sinandust, about 10 to 28 cm × 1.0 to 1.5 mm. They are vertical, green and have a distinct white midline. The leaves consist of two long lateral arms and a rectangular spine in the middle. The arms are bent in the direction of the spine. The flowers are white, rarely with violet-blue ends. Ecology, distribution, and recommended conservation measures: Grows in moist meadows at 700 m elevation.

== Etymology ==
The name of the species is named after Crocus, a friend of God Hermes. One day the two friends practice disk throwing and Hermes accidentally kills Crocus. A small flower emerges from where Crocus is, and Crocus's blood falls into the flower. The red-colored extensions (erosion) that appear at the center of the flower are Crocus's blood. In the second story about the name of the plant, a young forest fairy named Crocus falls in love with a shepherd girl named Smilax, but his love is not mutual, and he is consumed by his love and turned into a flower of liver (crocus), or where he dead, the flower of liver (crocus) come out. The shepherd girl, Smilax, whose name is mentioned in this story, turns into a climbing Smilax plant.

== Distribution and habitat ==
The common name in Turkey of Crocus pestalozzae is "Ümraniye Çiğdemi". The plant naturally only spreads in Turkey. It's seen in the woods, in the bushes and in the meadows. It has been observed in Izmit and Gebze districts. Umraniye crocus is one of the plants that bloom in early spring with white or lilac-blue flowers in moist heaths, meadows, and rocky areas. It is common only in northwestern Turkey (especially in Ümraniye-Istanbul). The largest populations are found in the triangle areas of Maltepe-Ömerli-Pendik in Istanbul. Although the species was densely distributed in the Anatolian part of Istanbul, it is now highly endangered due to the uncontrolled, unplanned, and rapid development of the city. The species was included in the Red Data Book of Turkey in the category VU (endangered) by Ekim et al.
