= Selamsız =

Neighbourhood in Istanbul, Turkey

Coordinates: 41°01′24.55″N 29°01′45.37″E

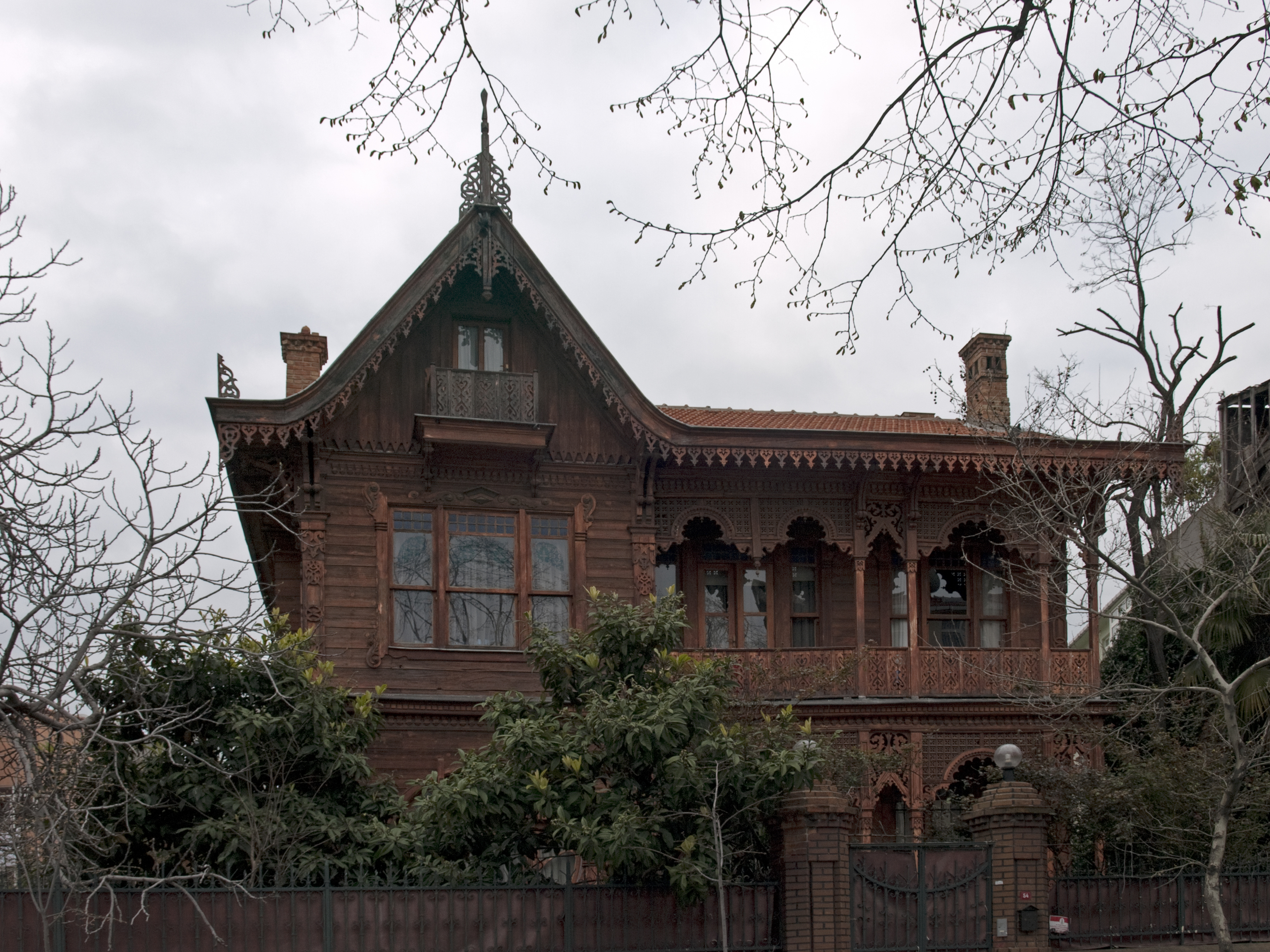
A wooden house on Gazi Cd in Selamsız.

Selamsız is a quarter in Üsküdar district on the Asian side of Istanbul, Turkey. It corresponds more or less to the current officially recognized neighborhoods of Selamiali and Muratreis. These neighborhoods are bounded on the north by Sultantepe, on the north and northeast by İcadiye, on the east by Altunizade, on the south by Valide-i Atik, and on the west by Mimarsinan.

The name selamsız means "without a selam" or "not giving a greeting; rude." The name comes from the Sheikh Selami Ali, who gave his name to a mosque, a dervish lodge, a public bath, and a public fountain in the quarter. Selami Ali was called Selamsız because he was known for not looking at or greeting people when he was in public.

== Romani ==
Selamsız is one of the historic Romani (Turkish-Gypsy) settlements of Istanbul, along with Sulukule, Çürüklük, Küçükbakkalköy, Tophane, Çayırboyu, and Lonca, and has been since the 1700s. However, 5000 Romanis are reported to have been evicted from the area in 1996, because they were living in shanty buildings which the municipality planned to demolish and rebuild according to standards. According to a Council of Europe report, in 2011 the Romani population of the quarter was about 1,400 in 310 households.

The oldest Romani group are the Tekkekapolo and the Kağıtçılar (Papermaker), recorded since 1730-1735, later after 1923 the semi-nomadic Badırmalıdes, came in the quarter.

== Hindiler Tekkesi ==
Mostly Turkish Roma, are members of the Hindiler Tekkesi a Qadiriyya-Tariqa, founded in 1738 by the Indian Muslim Sheykh Seyfullah Efendi El Hindi in Selamsız.

== Sights ==
=== Mosques and dervish lodges ===
Mosques in the area include Selami Ali Mosque (1965), Kara Alaattin Mosque (also known as Kara Kadı (Black Judge) Mosque and Çingene Fırın (Gypsy Oven) Mosque; present building constructed after 1937), Gonca Gül Mosque (2001), Şuca Ahmet Pasha Mosque (1692), Fevziye Hatun Mosque (1882), Ayazma Mescit (1982), and Fatma Hatun Mescit (present building constructed after 1887).

Dervish lodges in the area include Feyzullah Efendi Lodge (also known as the Hindiler (Indians) Lodge) and Acıbadem Lodge (sometimes called the Selâmi Ali Efendi Lodge).

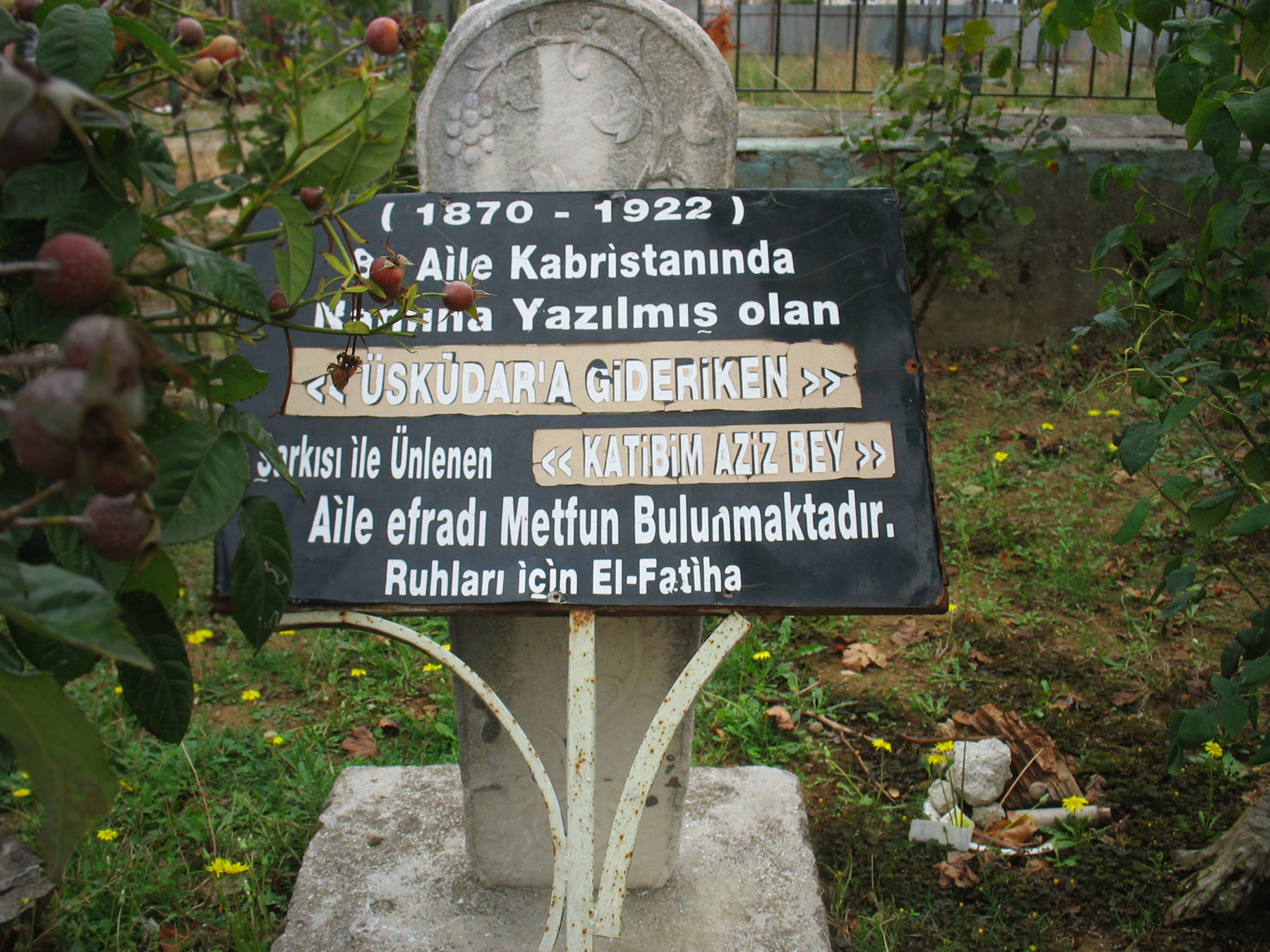
Cemetery in Selamsız

=== Cemeteries and tombs ===
The biggest cemetery in the neighborhood is Bülbülderesi Cemetery. There are also tombs and small cemeteries scattered throughout the neighborhood, usually near mosques and dervish lodges, for instance, the tomb of Köstendili Ali Efendi and the grave of Hadice Hanım (commonly called the tomb of "Selâmsız Baba"), both near the Acıbadem Lodge.

=== Churches ===
Churches in the area include the İlya Profiti (Prophet Elijah) Greek Orthodox Church (present building built 1831), the Surp Garabet (Saint John the Baptist) Armenian Church (first church on the site, 1590; present building built 1888), and the Surp Haç (Holy Cross) Armenian Church (built 1676, rebuilt 1880).

=== Schools ===
High schools is the area include Cumhuriyet (Republic) High School, Üsküdar American Academy, Ahmet Keleşoğlu Anatolian High School, Bağlarbaşı Private High School, Istanbul Science High School, and Surp Haç (Holy Cross) Armenian Private High School.

Elementary and middle schools include Selami Ali Primary School, Bağlarbaşı Primary School, Hilmi Çelikoğlu Primary School, Kalfayan Armenian Private Primary School, Semerciyan Cemran Armenian Private Primary School, Üsküdar Private Primary School, and the Bağlarbaşı campus of Sev Private Primary School.

Adult education centers include the Üsküdar Public Education Center.
