= Mevlana station =

Station of the Istanbul Metro

Mevlana
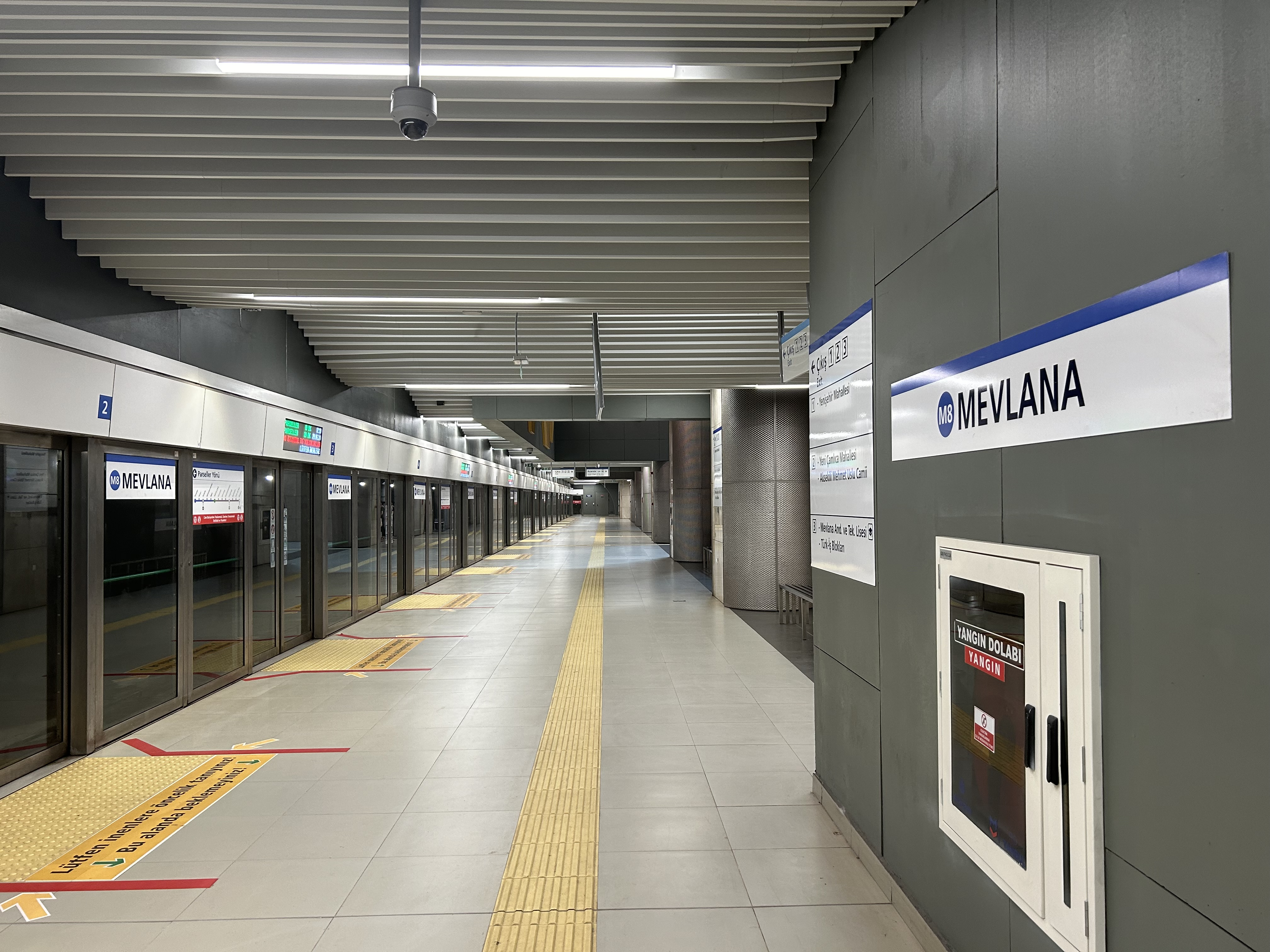
- Platform

General information
- Location: Mevlana Neighborhood, Necip Fazıl Boulevard, 34779; Ataşehir, Istanbul; Turkey
- Coordinates: 40°59′32″N 29°9′12″E
- System: Istanbul Metro rapid transit station
- Owner: Istanbul Metropolitan Municipality
- Operator: Istanbul Metro
- Line: M8
- Platforms: 1 Island platform
- Tracks: 2
- Connections: İETT Bus: 14A, 14AK, 14CE, 14S, 14T, 14TM, 14ÇK, 14ŞB, 19D, 19E, 19EK, 19ES, 19S, 19SB, 19V, 320, E-3; Istanbul Minibus: Bostancı - Kayışdağı - Dudullu, Bostancı - Tavukçu Yolu - Dudullu, Üsküdar - Ferhatpaşa

Construction
- Structure type: Underground
- Parking: No
- Cycle facilities: Yes
- Accessible: Yes

History
- Opened: 6 January 2023 (3 years ago)
- Electrified: 1,500 V DC Overhead line

Services
Preceding station	Istanbul Metro	Following station
Kayışdağı towards Bostancı	M8 Line	İMES towards Parseller
Location

Mevlana is an underground station on the M8 line of the Istanbul Metro. It is located under Necip Fazıl Boulevard in the Mevlana neighborhood of Ataşehir. It was opened on 6 January 2023.

== Station layout ==
Platform level	Southbound	← toward Bostancı (Kayışdağı)
Platform level	Island platform, doors will open on the left
Platform level	Northbound	toward Parseller (İMES) →

== Operation information ==
The line operates between 06:00 and 23:00 and train frequency is 8 minutes and 40 seconds. The line has no night service.

== Gallery ==
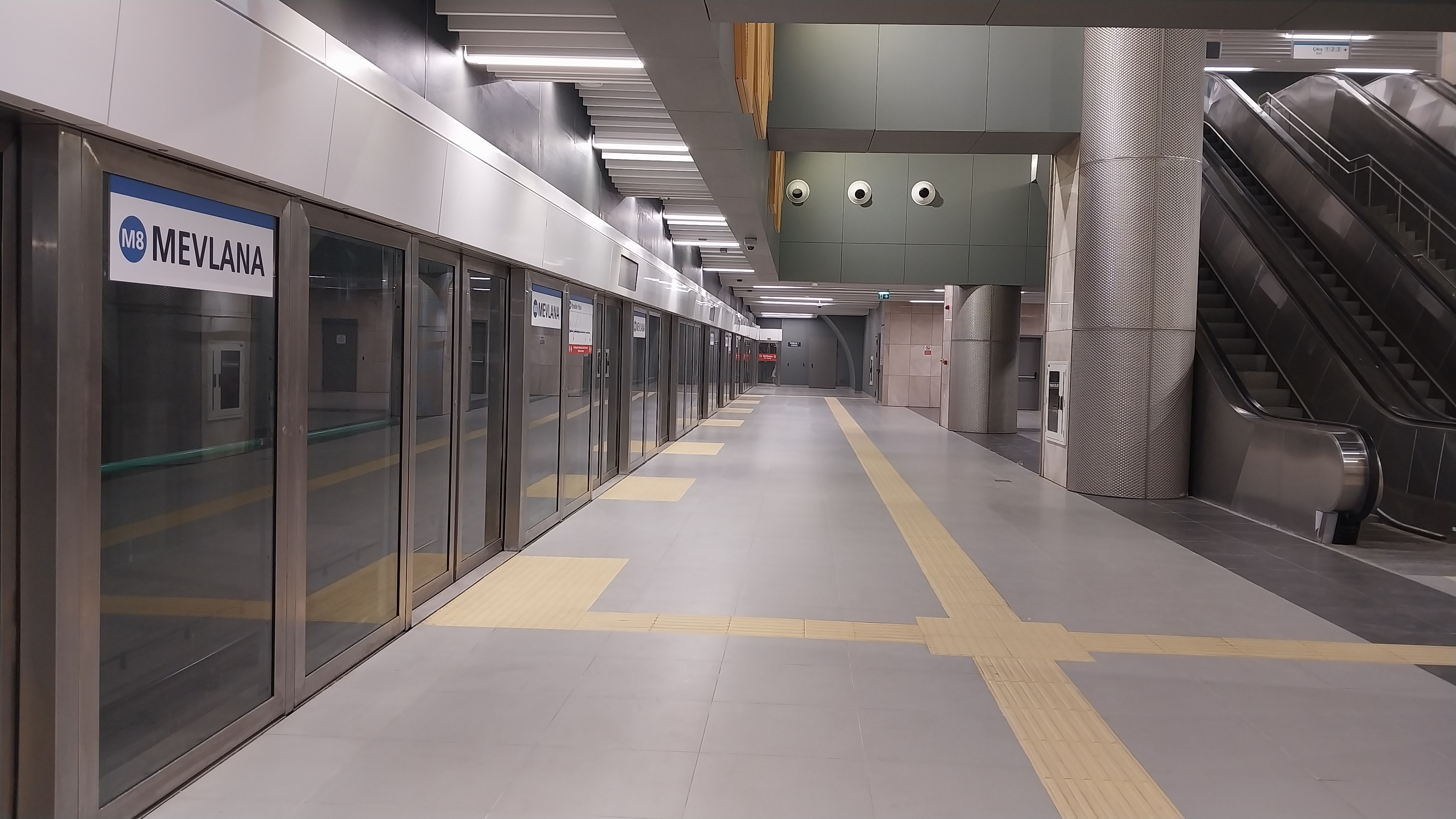
Platform
