= Kayışdağı station =

Station of the Istanbul Metro

Kayışdağı
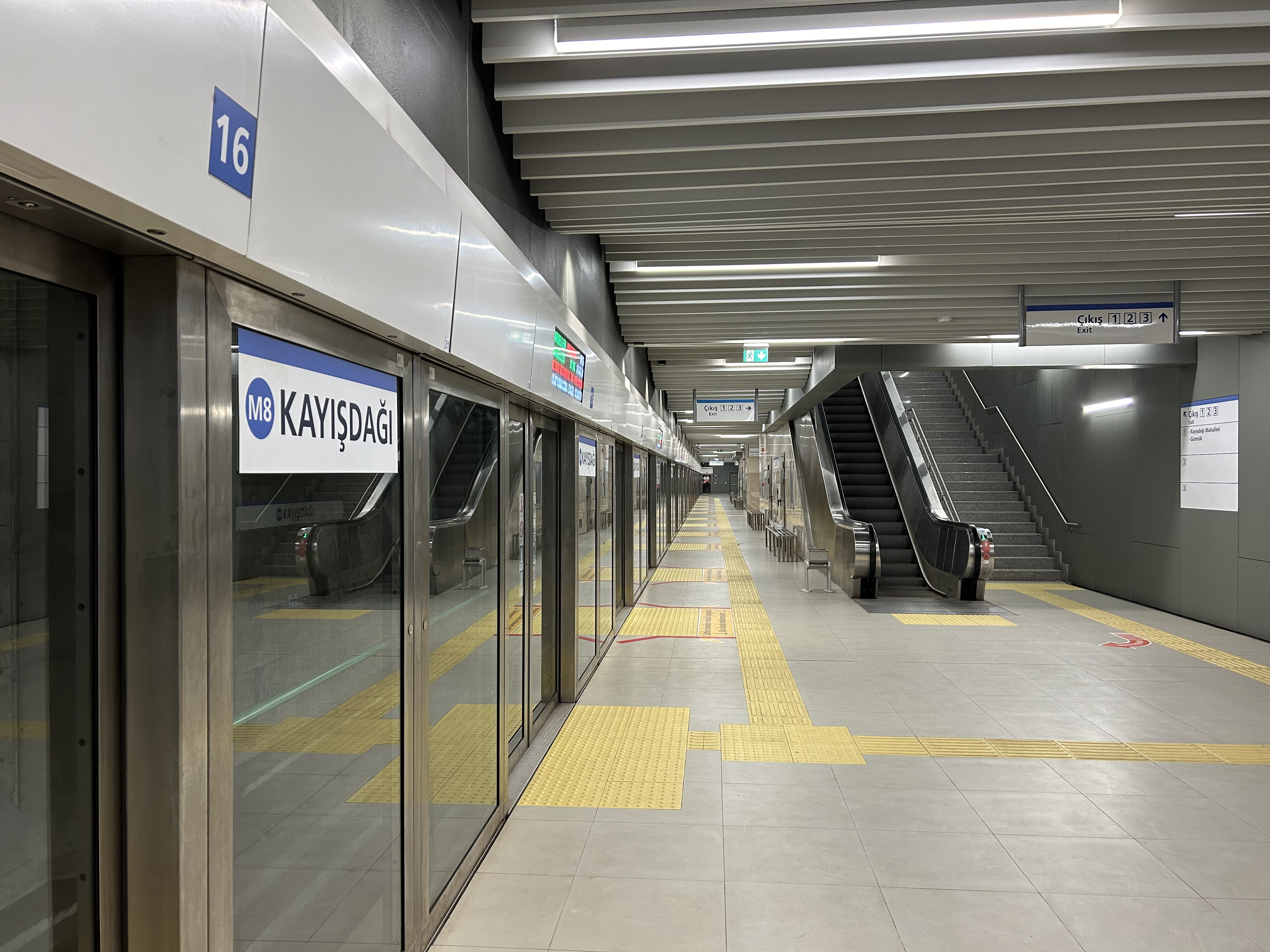
- Platform

General information
- Location: Kayışdağı Neighborhood, Dudullu Street, 34755; Ataşehir, Istanbul; Turkey
- Coordinates: 40°59′5″N 29°8′16″E
- System: Istanbul Metro rapid transit station
- Owner: Istanbul Metropolitan Municipality
- Operator: Istanbul Metro
- Line: M8
- Platforms: 2 Side platforms
- Tracks: 3
- Connections: İETT Bus: 14A, 14AK, 14S, 14T, 19EK, 19ES, 19SB, 19T, 19Y, 320A, 320Y; Istanbul Minibus: Bostancı - Tavukçu Yolu - Dudullu, Kadıköy - Küçükbakkalköy - Ataşehir

Construction
- Structure type: Underground
- Parking: No
- Cycle facilities: Yes
- Accessible: Yes

History
- Opened: 6 January 2023 (3 years ago)
- Electrified: 1,500 V DC Overhead line

Services
Preceding station	Istanbul Metro	Following station
İçerenköy towards Bostancı	M8 Line	Mevlana towards Parseller
Location

Kayışdağı is an underground station on the M8 line of the Istanbul Metro. It is located under Dudullu Street in the Kayışdağı neighborhood of Ataşehir. It was opened on 6 January 2023.

== Station layout ==
Side platform, doors will open on the right
Southbound	← toward Bostancı (İçerenköy)
Middle Track	← Siding →
Northbound	toward Parseller (Mevlana) →
Side platform, doors will open on the right

== Operation information ==
The line operates between 06:00 and 23:00 and train frequency is 8 minutes and 40 seconds. The line has no night service.

== Gallery ==
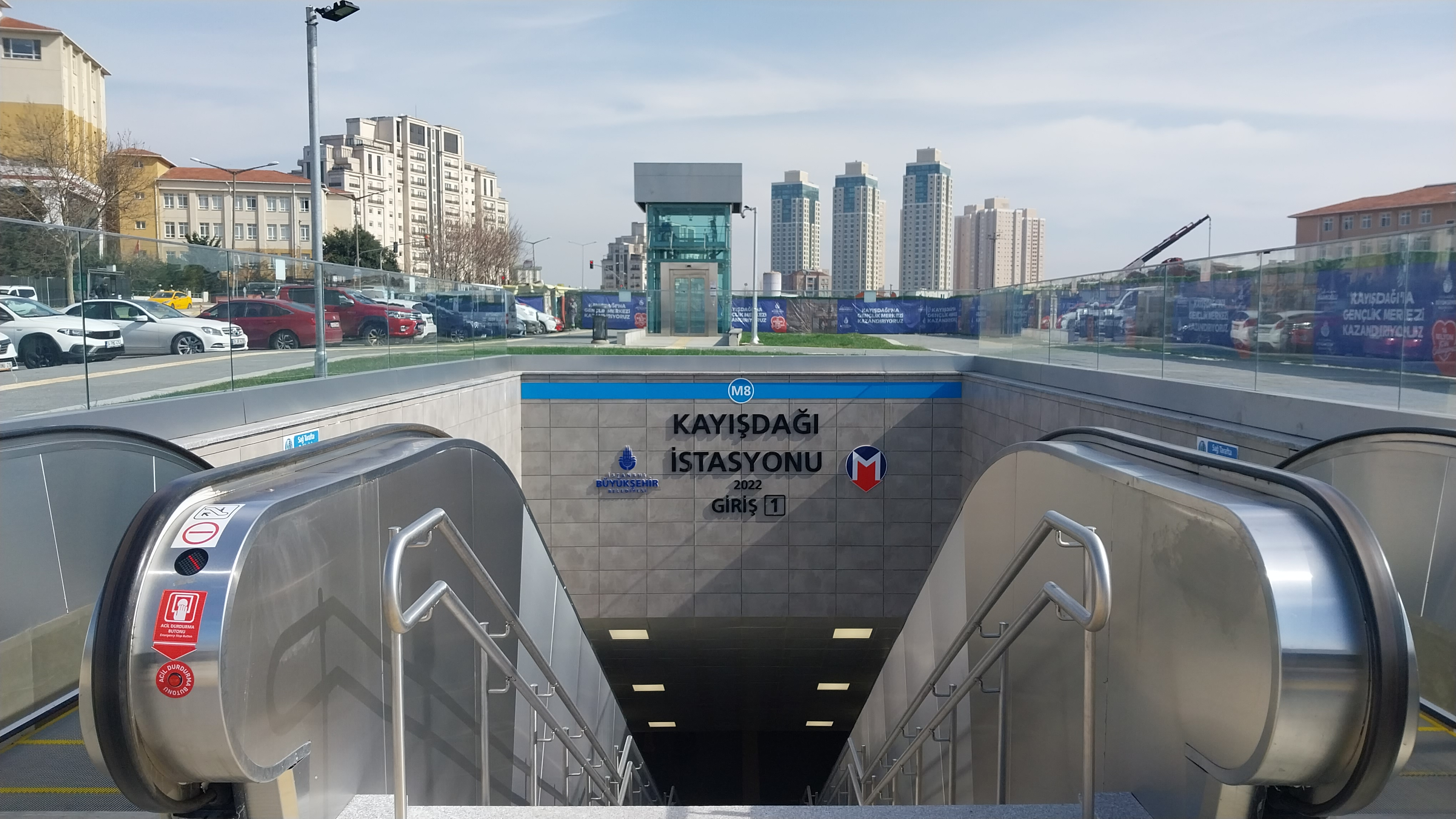
Entrance 1

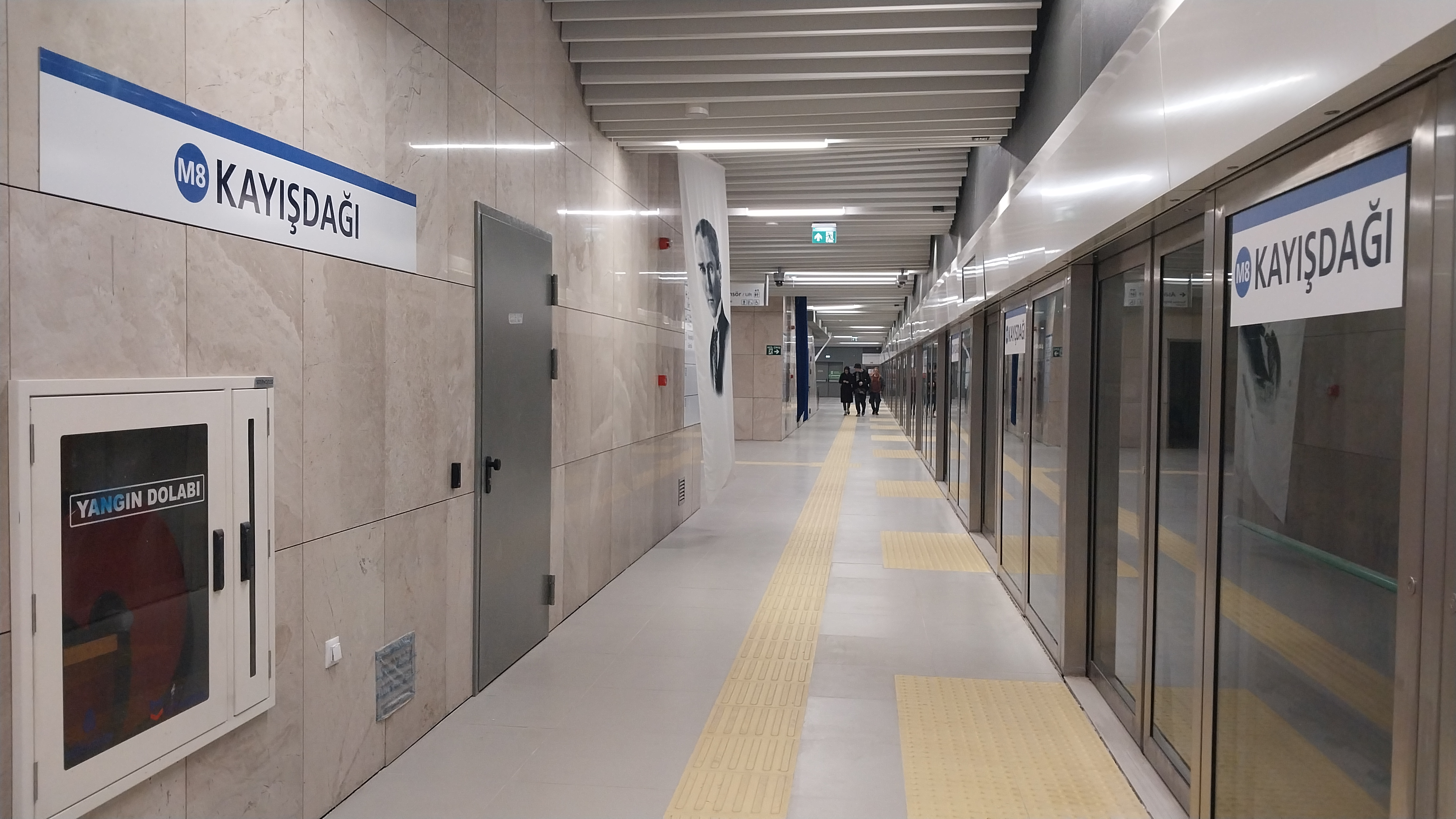
Platform
