= Çürüklük =

Çürüklük is a small neighborhood in Kasımpaşa in the Beyoğlu municipality on the European side of Istanbul, Turkey.

The word çürüklük means "rottenness," "garbage dump," or "graveyard for executed criminals and paupers." The area is said to have been built on the site of a Byzantine garbage dump that stretched from Elmadağ in Şişli to Tepebaşı in Beyoğlu (near the present British Consulate).

Çürüklük is one of the historic Romani ("Gypsy") neighborhoods of Istanbul, along with Selamsız, Sulukule, Küçükbakkalköy, Tophane, Çayırboyu, and Lonca.
