= Küçükyalı =

- Neighbourhood
- Location in Turkey Küçükyalı (Istanbul)
- Coordinates: 40°57′N 29°07′E
- Country: Turkey
- Province: Istanbul
- District: Maltepe
- Population (2022): 26,086
- Time zone: UTC+3 (TRT)

Küçükyalı or Küçükyalı Merkez is a neighbourhood in the municipality and district of Maltepe, Istanbul Province, Turkey. Its population is 26,086 (2022). It is on the Asian side of Istanbul, on the coast of the Marmara Sea.

== Transport ==
Metro

- M4 Kadıköy- Sabiha Gökçen Airport
