= Esatpaşa, Ataşehir =

Esatpaşa
- Neighbourhood
- Location in Turkey Esatpaşa (Istanbul)
- Coordinates: 41.0035°N 29.0851°E
- Country: Turkey
- Province: Istanbul
- District: Ataşehir
- Population (2023): 32,602
- Time zone: UTC+3 (TRT)

Esatpaşa is a neighbourhood in the municipality and district of Ataşehir, Istanbul Province, Turkey. Its population is 32,602 (2023). It is on the Asian side of Istanbul. It is bounded on the north by the Cumhuriyet neighborhood of Üsküdar, on the east by the Aşıkveysel neighborhood of Ataşehir, on the south and west by the Örnek neighborhood of Ataşehir, and on the west by the Fetih neighborhood of Ataşehir.

The neighborhood is in the location of the former Esatpaşa Farm, which was named after the owner, Mehmet Esat Işık, an Ottoman politician and ophthalmologist.

The neighborhood was organized in 1969 and includes three high schools, two primary schools, three mosques, and ten parks.

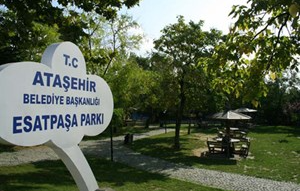
Esatpaşa Park

== History ==
Esatpaşa Neighborhood takes its name from Dr. Mehmet Esat Işık (Esat Pasha), a prominent ophthalmologist of the late Ottoman period. In the early 20th century, Esat Pasha purchased a large farm estate in the Libadiye area, covering what are now the Fetih and Esatpaşa neighborhoods, so that his children — Hasan Esat Işık and Tomris — could grow up in a healthy natural environment. The family spent their summers there, and Esat Pasha himself often stayed at the farmhouse, engaging in hunting. Hasan Esat Işık later became a well-known diplomat and statesman. During the Republican period, the estate was expropriated by the state, and over time, the modern Esatpaşa neighborhood developed on this land.
