= İçerenköy =

- Neighbourhood
- Location in Turkey İçerenköy (Istanbul)
- Coordinates: 40°58′09″N 29°06′59″E
- Country: Turkey
- Province: Istanbul
- District: Ataşehir
- Population (2022): 72,899
- Time zone: UTC+3 (TRT)

İçerenköy is a neighbourhood in the municipality and district of Ataşehir, Istanbul Province, Turkey. Its population is 72,899 (2022).

İçerenköy is home to the Swiss Hospital (Turkish: İsviçre Hastanesi), the 5-star hotels Greenpark and Marriott, and Hasan Leyli Secondary School (Turkish: Hasan Leyli İlköğretim Okulu), which is the largest of its kind in Ataşehir.

Its proximity to transport amenities and ease of access, as well as its recent modernisation, make it a sought-after neighbourhood.
