= Ataşehir =

- District and municipality
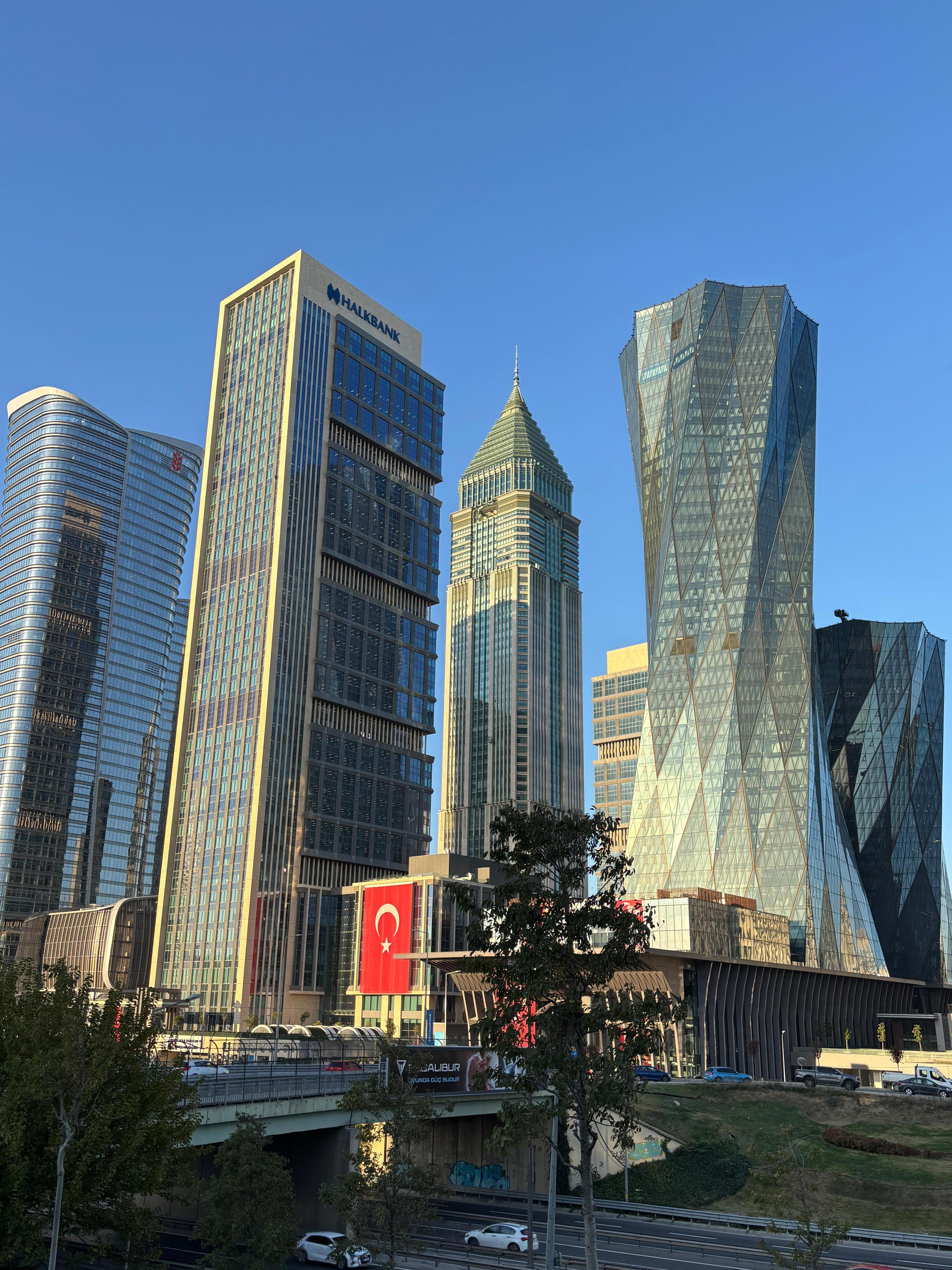
- Istanbul Financial Center in Ataşehir

- Logo

- Map showing Ataşehir District in Istanbul Province

- Location within Turkey Location within Istanbul
- Coordinates: 40°59′00″N 29°07′40″E
- Country: Turkey
- Province: Istanbul

Government
  - Mayor: Onursal Adıgüzel (CHP)
- Area: 25 km^{2} (9.7 sq mi)
- Population (2022): 423,127
  - Density: 17,000/km^{2} (44,000/sq mi)
- Time zone: UTC+3 (TRT)
- Area code: 0216
- Website: www.atasehir.bel.tr

Ataşehir (Turkish pronunciation: [ataˈʃehiɾ]) is a municipality and district of Istanbul, Turkey. Its area is 25 km^{2}, and its population is 423,127 (2022). It is located at the junction of the O-2 and O-4 motorways on the Anatolian (Asian) side of Istanbul. Its neighbours are the districts of Ümraniye to the north, Sancaktepe to the northeast, Maltepe to the east, Kadıköy to the south and Üsküdar to the west.

Since 2023, Ataşehir is home to the Istanbul Financial Center (IFC), where the new headquarters of the state-owned Turkish banks, such as the Turkish Central Bank, Ziraat Bank, VakıfBank and Halkbank, are located. Until 2023, the headquarters of these banks were in Ankara. As of 2024, the tallest buildings in Ataşehir are the 352 m (1,154 ft 10 in) Turkish Central Bank Tower, which is followed by Metropol Istanbul Tower A (70 floors / 301 metres including its twin spires).

Unlike in Başakşehir, another satellite city (on the western part of the European side of Istanbul), no single-family house types were designed for Ataşehir's residential projects. Most buildings in Ataşehir are high-rise towers, while some of them (especially around the main public squares in the district) are among Istanbul's and Turkey's tallest skyscrapers.

The M4 line (Kozyatağı and Yenisahra stations) and the M8 line (Kozyatağı, Küçükbakkalköy, İçerenköy, Kayışdağı and Mevlana) of the Istanbul Metro serves the district.

== History ==
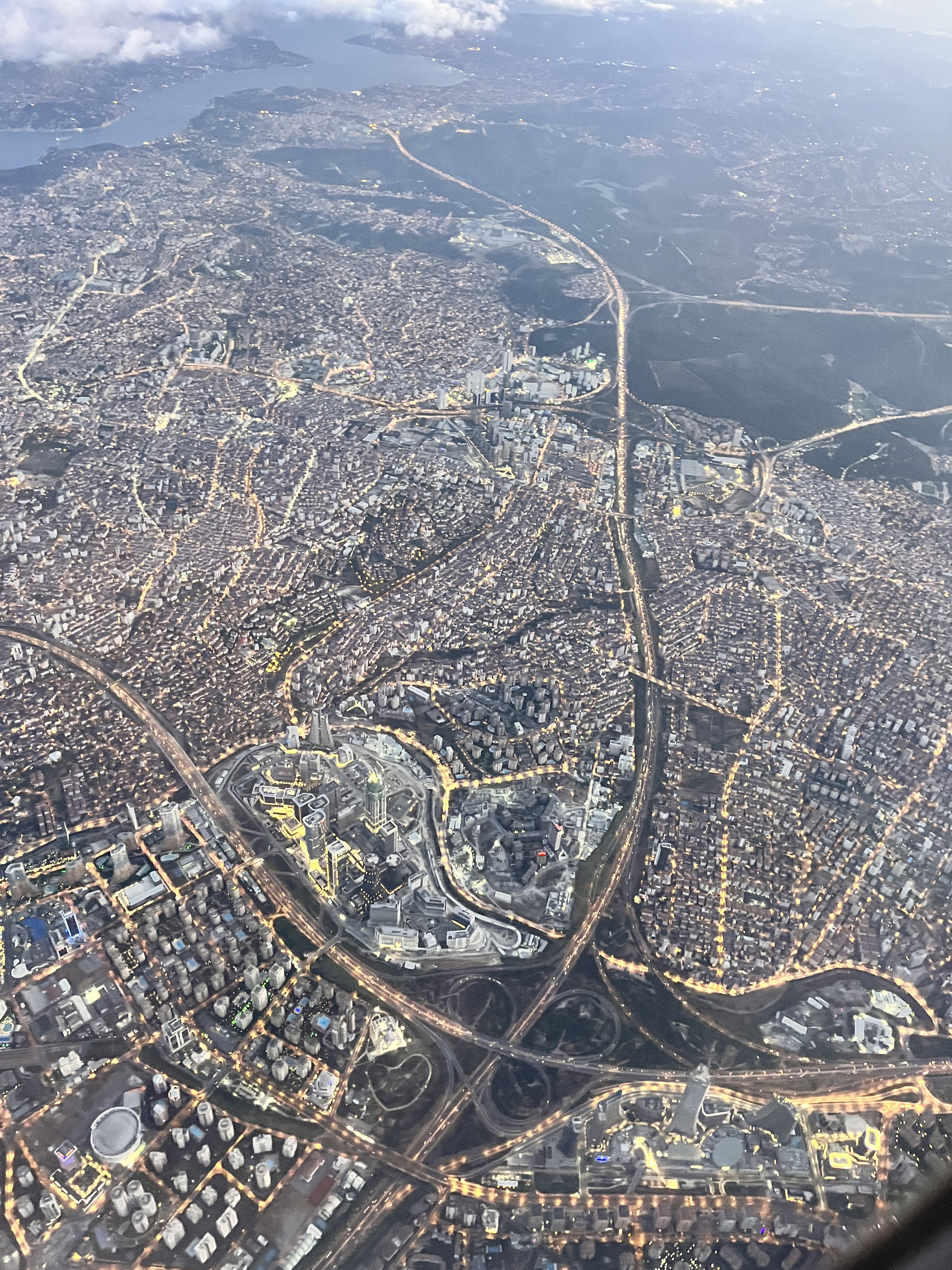
Aerial view of Ataşehir

In 2008 the district Ataşehir was created from parts of the districts Kadıköy, Üsküdar, Ümraniye and Kartal.

The original housing development of Ataşehir was designed to include 18,000 high-rise condominiums offering luxury residences for 80,000 people with higher incomes. Ataşehir was awarded the Habitat prize in 2005.

As of 2006, 8596 housing units were present within the site, housing approximately 35,000 people. New investments still continue on the last empty sites of the district.

== Politics and administration ==
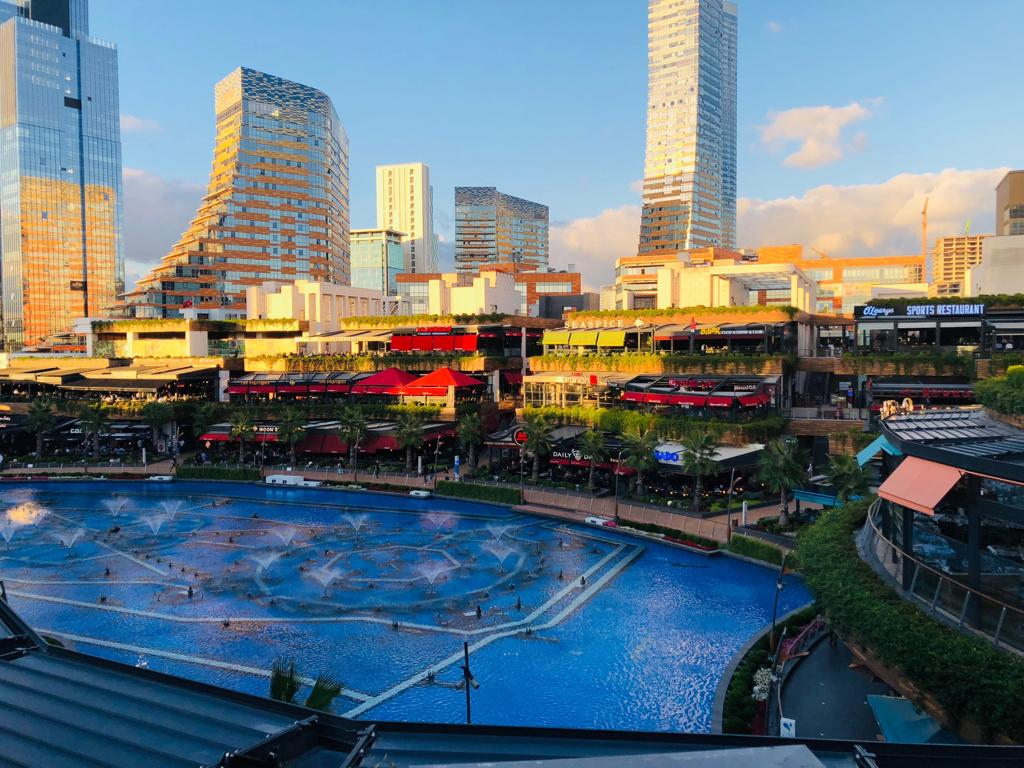
Watergarden with Varyap Meridian Towers in Ataşehir

Ataşehir Municipality has been founded in 2009. The municipal building and the district's security directorate are located in the neighborhood of Barbaros. Ataşehir Municipality has 24 subordinate directorates.

Local elections
Date	Mayor	Party	% of votes
2009	Battal İlgezdi	CHP	41.69
2014	Battal İlgezdi	CHP	49.80
2019	Battal İlgezdi	CHP	51.39
2024	Onursal Adıgüzel	CHP	56.39

General elections
Date	Party	% of votes
2011	AKP	45.64
June 2015	AKP	37.45
November 2015	AKP	43.60
2018	AKP	37.51

=== Composition ===
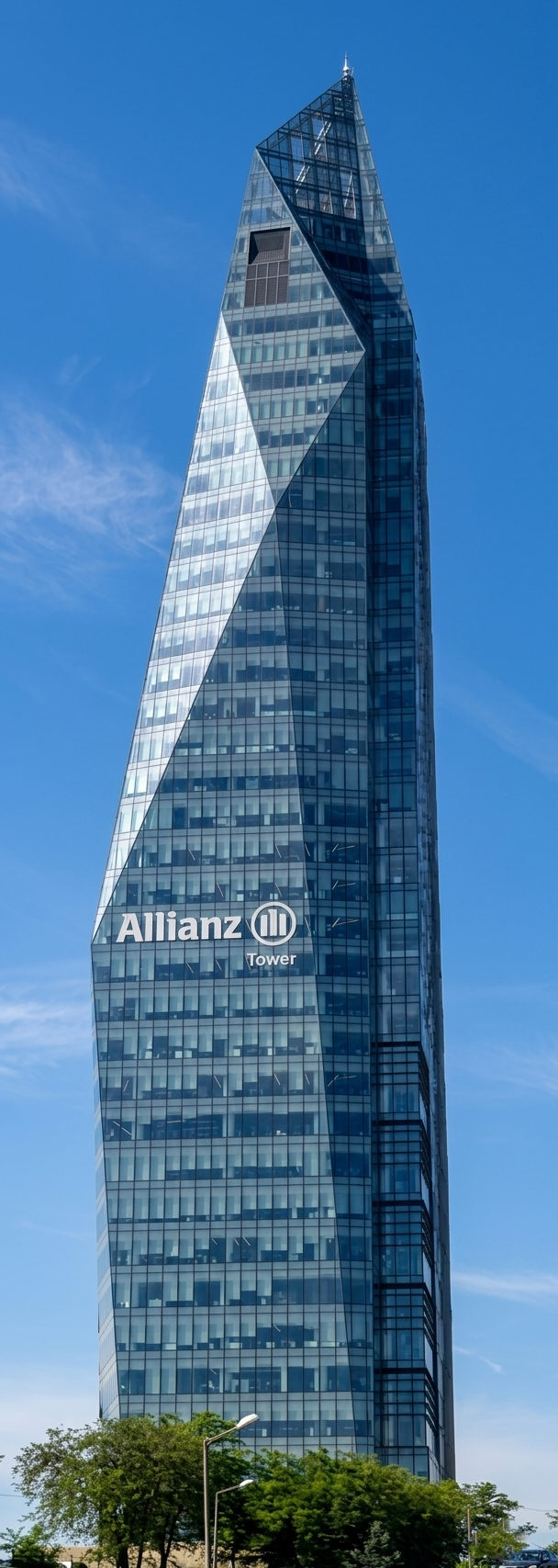
Allianz Tower in Ataşehir, Istanbul

There are 17 neighbourhoods in Ataşehir District:

- Aşık Veysel
- Atatürk
- Barbaros
- Esatpaşa
- Ferhatpaşa
- Fetih
- İçerenköy
- İnönü
- Kayışdağı
- Küçükbakkalköy
- Mevlana
- Mimar Sinan
- Mustafa Kemal
- Örnek
- Yeni Çamlıca
- Yenisahra
- Yenişehir

== Economy ==
Ataşehir is a business and trading centre and hosts the headquarters and offices of numerous companies. Opened in 2023, the Istanbul Financial Center (IFC) in the Ataşehir district brings together the new headquarters of the Central Bank of the Republic of Turkey and other state-owned banks, such as Ziraat Bank, VakıfBank and Halkbank.

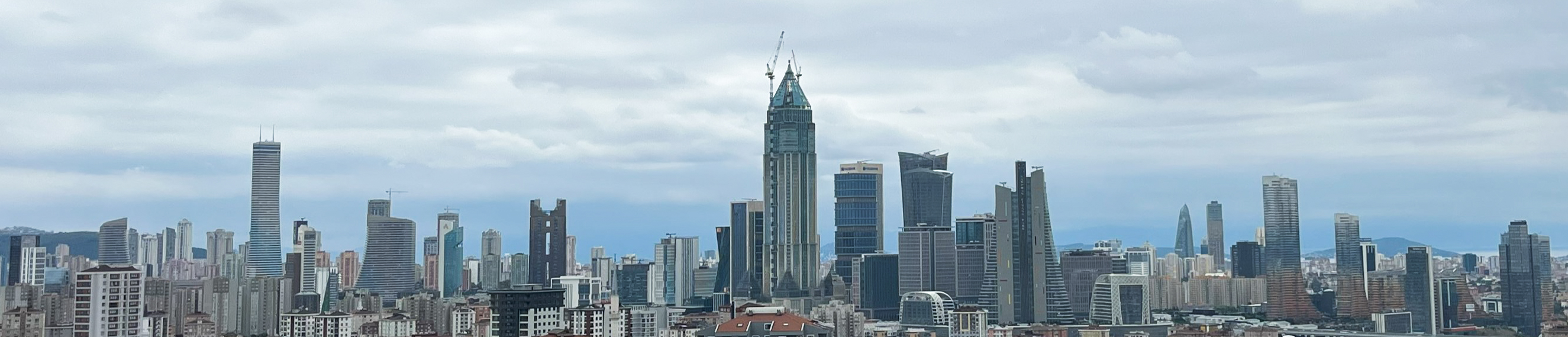
IFC and the skyline of Ataşehir on the Asian side of Istanbul

== Transportation ==
Ataşehir can be reached with the M4 line (Kozyatağı and Yenisahra stations) and the M8 line (Kozyatağı, İçerenköy, Küçükbakkalköy, Kayışdağı, Mevlana) of the Istanbul Metro.

For private car owners the subdivision is: 20-30 minutes from the Fatih Sultan Mehmet Bridge; 3 minutes from Highway D-100 and the İzmit-Ankara Trans-European Motorway (TEM); 20 minutes from Bağdat Avenue, the upper-class high street of Kadıköy district; and 30-40 minutes from Sabiha Gökçen Airport, the second international airport of Istanbul.

== Sports ==
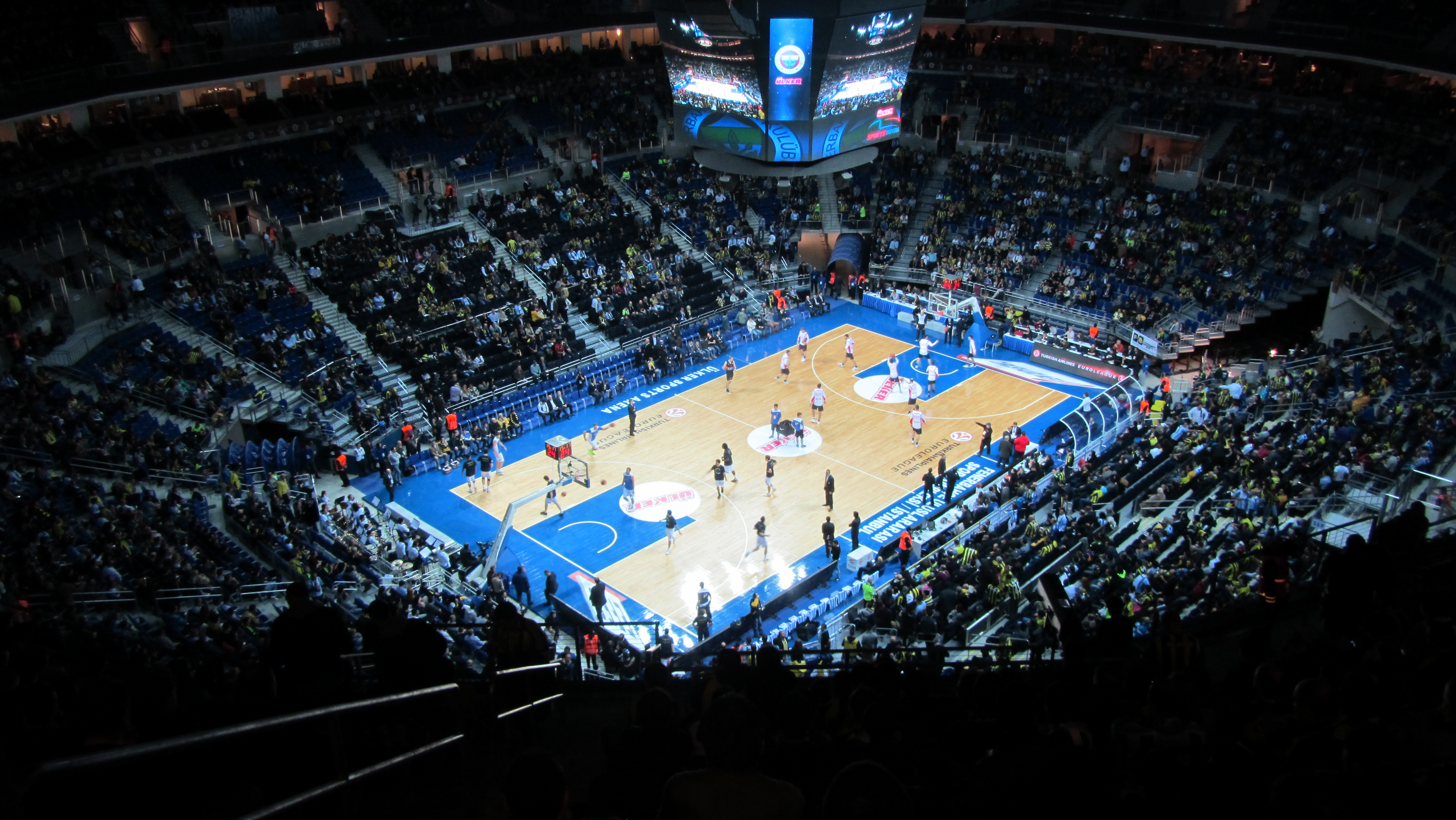
Ülker Sports and Event Hall in Ataşehir, home of Fenerbahçe

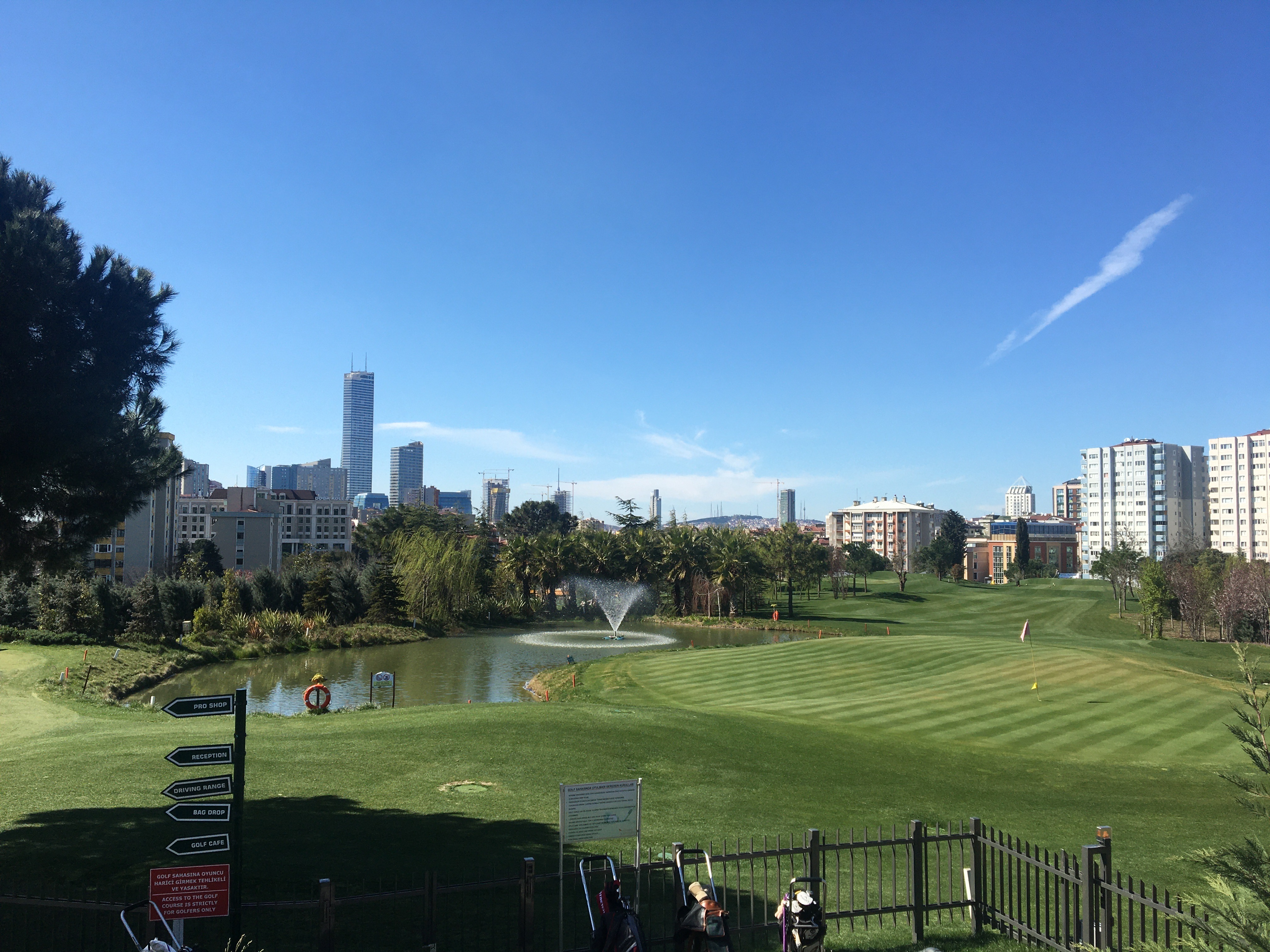
A view of Ataşehir Golf Club, with Metropol Istanbul Tower A (70 floors, 301 metres) in the background

Ülker Sports and Event Hall, home of Fenerbahçe's basketball team, is in Ataşehir. The women's football club Ataşehir Belediyespor plays in the Turkish Women's First Football League. The team was the champion in the 2010–11 and 2011–12 seasons. Their home court is Yenisahra Stadium. There is a facility of Galatasaray S.K., named Taçspor in Küçükbakkalköy.

Ataşehir Golf Club [tr] has a 6-hole course that was opened in 2017. The club also regularly hosts footgolf events.

There are tennis and football clubs in West Ataşehir area. A basketball court in East Ataşehir, built by Nike, was named after Kevin Durant. An olympic level swimming pool facility is located at İçerenköy.

== Education ==
Yeditepe University, one of the largest private universities in Turkey, is located in Ataşehir. Fenerbahçe University is also located in Ataşehir.

== Libraries ==
Ahmet Telli Çocuk ve Halk Kütüphanesi and Atatürk Kütüphanesi are the public libraries in the district.

== Climate ==
The district of Ataşehir has a Mediterranean climate (Csa/Cs) according to both Köppen and Trewartha climate classifications, with cool winters and warm to hot summers.

It is in USDA hardiness zone 9a and AHS heat zone 3.

Climate data for Sarıgazi (Note: Sarıgazi is in the district of Sancaktepe; however, it is the closest station to Ataşehir climatically.)
Month	Jan	Feb	Mar	Apr	May	Jun	Jul	Aug	Sep	Oct	Nov	Dec	Year
Mean daily maximum °C (°F)	8.5 (47.3)	9.2 (48.6)	11.0 (51.8)	16.2 (61.2)	20.9 (69.6)	25.5 (77.9)	27.6 (81.7)	27.4 (81.3)	24.4 (75.9)	19.3 (66.7)	15.1 (59.2)	11.0 (51.8)	18.0 (64.4)
Daily mean °C (°F)	5.5 (41.9)	6.1 (43.0)	7.4 (45.3)	11.8 (53.2)	16.1 (61.0)	20.5 (68.9)	22.7 (72.9)	22.8 (73.0)	19.8 (67.6)	15.5 (59.9)	11.6 (52.9)	8.0 (46.4)	14.0 (57.2)
Mean daily minimum °C (°F)	2.4 (36.3)	2.9 (37.2)	3.7 (38.7)	7.3 (45.1)	11.3 (52.3)	15.4 (59.7)	17.8 (64.0)	18.2 (64.8)	15.2 (59.4)	11.6 (52.9)	8.1 (46.6)	4.9 (40.8)	9.9 (49.8)
Average precipitation mm (inches)	111 (4.4)	75 (3.0)	72 (2.8)	52 (2.0)	37 (1.5)	28 (1.1)	26 (1.0)	36 (1.4)	51 (2.0)	82 (3.2)	95 (3.7)	130 (5.1)	795 (31.2)
