= Küçükbakkalköy =

- Neighbourhood
- Location in Turkey Küçükbakkalköy (Istanbul)
- Coordinates: 40°59′N 29°07′E
- Country: Turkey
- Province: Istanbul
- District: Ataşehir
- Population (2022): 30,050
- Time zone: UTC+3 (TRT)

Küçükbakkalköy is a neighborhood (mahalle) in the municipality and district of Ataşehir, Istanbul Province, Turkey.

Its population is 30,050 (2022).

The neighborhood is on the Anatolian side of Istanbul. It is bounded on the north and northeast by the Ataşehir neighborhood of Atatürk; on the southeast by the Ataşehir neighborhoods of İnönü, Kayışdağı, and İçerenköy; on the south by the Ataşehir neighborhood of İçerenköy; and on the northwest by the Ataşehir neighborhoods of Barbaros and Atatürk.

== Name ==
The name Küçükbakkalköy means "little grocery village" (Turkish: küçük + bakkal + köy). The name is said to come from the market held in the Greek village that formerly existed in the area.

The neighborhood was referred to as Μικροῦ Βακάλ-κιοϊ (Mikrou Vakal-kioi) in an 1823 history, as Πακαλ-κιοι (Pakal-kioi) on an 1875 Greek gravestone, as Micro-Bakal-keuy in an 1878 population report, and as Kutchuq Bakal-Keuy in an 1899 article on Ottoman cemeteries.

== History ==
The neighborhood is said to date from Byzantine times, with the neighborhood's Acısu Çeşmesi ("bitter water fountain") thought to be part of an old ayazma.

Küçükbakkalköy is one of the historic Romani ("Gypsy") neighborhoods of Istanbul, along with Sulukule, Selamsız, Çürüklük, Tophane, Çayırboyu, and Lonca. In 2006, there were reported to be 240 Romani households in the neighborhood.

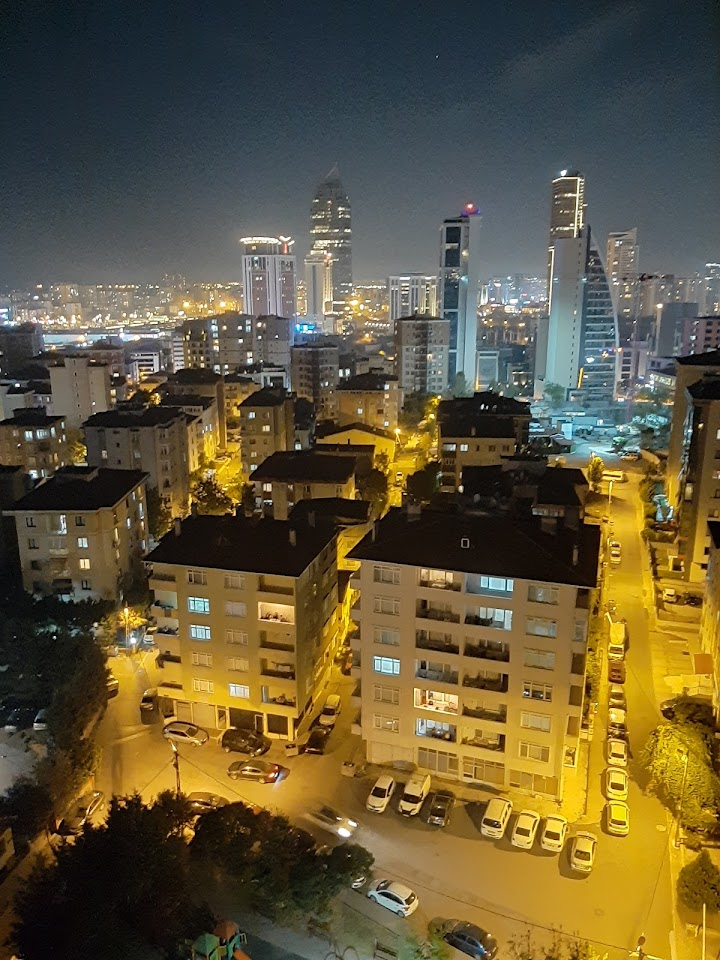
skyscrapers in Küçükbakkalköy
