= Maltepe, Istanbul =

Maltepe
- District and municipality
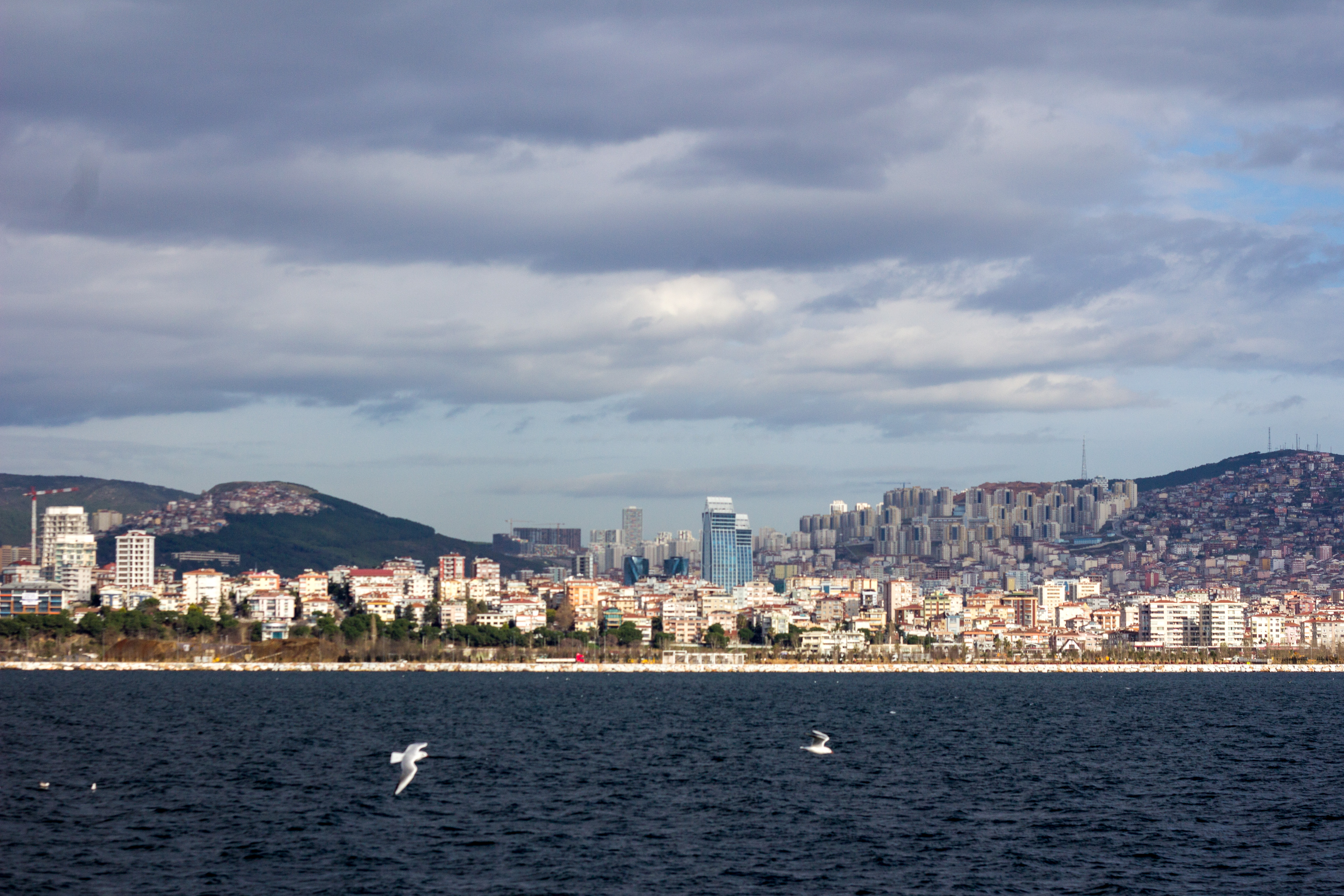
- İdealtepe neighbourhood in Maltepe

- Logo

- Map showing Maltepe District in Istanbul Province

- Location within Turkey Location within Istanbul
- Coordinates: 40°55′29″N 29°07′52″E
- Country: Turkey
- Province: Istanbul

Government
  - Mayor: Esin Köymen (Yeni Parti)
- Area: 53 km^{2} (20 sq mi)
- Population (2022): 525.044
  - Density: 9.9/km^{2} (26/sq mi)
- Time zone: UTC+3 (TRT)
- Area code: 0216
- Website: www.maltepe.bel.tr

Maltepe is a municipality and district of Istanbul Province, Turkey. Its area is 53 km^{2}, and its population is 528,544 (2022). It is on the northern shore of the Sea of Marmara, adjacent to the Kadıköy district to the west, Kartal district to the east and Ataşehir district to the northwest.

== History ==
In Byzantine times, the area was known as Bryas (Greek: Βρύας). In ca. 837, the emperor Theophilos (r. 829–842) built here a palace in Arab style, inspired by the palaces of the Abbasids in Baghdad. It was described to him by his ambassador to the Abbasid court, John Grammatikos. A ruin in nearby Küçükyalı has been identified as it.

This coast has been a retreat from the city since Byzantine and Ottoman times, and right up until the 1970s was a rural area occupied with summer homes for wealthy residents. Being on the suburban railway line, Maltepe was a favorite spot for day-trippers or weekenders to visit the beach and many summer houses were built there. Many of these houses remain even after Maltepe no longer was a beach retreat.

Between 1992 and 2004, it bordered Ümraniye from the northwest. However, in 1994, Yeni Çamlıca District was changed to Ümraniye and Ferhatpaşa District was transferred to Samandıra of Kartal district in 2004. The departure of Ferhatpaşa ends the neighboring relationship between Maltepe and Ümraniye.

Badly damaged after the İzmit earthquake 1999, most high-rise apartments were left in need of repair and fortification, and although most buildings in the district have been subject to urban renewal to comply with the new earthquake regulations, many buildings remain standing with structural damage cracks.

== Maltepe today ==
The population grew rapidly from the 70's onwards when, following the building of the Bosphorus Bridge, it became possible to commute from here to the city. Medium of transport in today's Maltepe is done by rail and road. Railway is the route where old Maltepe was established between Maltepe's D-100 Highway and Marmara Sea. The highway divides Maltepe into three parts. This road connects Maltepe to Anatolia and the side roads to the neighboring districts. The second important route is the Bağdat Avenue. The street starts from Kızıltoprak in Kadıköy and continues until Cevizli in Maltepe.

The D-100 highway divides Maltepe into two horizontally. North of the highway is Başıbüyük, a working-class neighborhood, which from afar appears as a wooded hill where the Süreyyapaşa Hospital (formerly used as a sanatorium) and also a large cemetery are located.

Zümrütevler, which, akin to Başıbüyük, also stands in the northern half of the district. It is residential in most parts, and is the most populated neighborhood in the Asian side of Istanbul, with 88.042 residents as of 2022. Today, neighborhoods of Maltepe under the D-100 highway are slightly more developed than north of the highway with newer housing, easier access to public transport and education.

Maltepe Square is located in a point where the now-pedestrianized Bağdat Avenue and Atatürk Avenue, both of which host many boutiques, shops and cafes happen to merge. It serves as the primary meeting point for Maltepe as it spans a police station, an art gallery, a private hospital, as well as the Republic Mosque. The square was inaugurated in 2024.

The Republic Mosque was opened to prayer in November 2001, and has been built in the traditional style of a Turkish Mosque, inspired by the Blue Mosque. Its interior contains a tall high dome, a large gallery, and a balcony where women may pray. The gallery hosts tiled mosaics of various sights of importance to Islam and carved wood frames.

=== Amenities ===
Maltepe is just a small distance from the city. It is a busy shopping district which has some big supermarkets, branches of some pastry shops and all the other modern amenities. In addition to these, Maltepe has many cinemas, fast-food places, and famous kebab houses. There is the seashore where there are cafes, a few bars, and cafes with live music similar (but on a much smaller scale) to those found in Kadıköy or in Taksim. Public transportation in Maltepe is generally provided by Metro, Marmaray, buses, and minibuses.

== Geography ==
Maltepe is located in the southwestern part of the Kocaeli Peninsula, on the Marmara Sea coast of Istanbul. Maltepe has approximately 7km of coastline to the Marmara Sea. The district has the highest peak at 440m. The seaside is covered with sand, clay and silica from the coast.

=== Composition ===
There are 18 neighbourhoods in Maltepe District:

- Altayçeşme
- Altıntepe
- Aydınevler
- Bağlarbaşı
- Başıbüyük
- Büyükbakkalköy
- Cevizli
- Çınar
- Esenkent
- Feyzullah
- Fındıklı
- Girne
- Gülensu
- Gülsuyu
- İdealtepe
- Küçükyalı Merkez
- Yalı
- Zümrütevler

== Politics ==
Maltepe was separated from Kartal district on 1 November 1992 with ANAP candidate Bahtiyar Uyanık being elected as the first mayor of Maltepe with 28.37% of the votes in the midterm election, serving 2 more full-terms until he transferred his seat to AK Party candidate Fikri Köse, who received 43.01% of the votes in the 2004 elections. In the 2009 elections, with 51.39% of the votes, Prof. Dr. Mustafa Zengin from the CHP was elected mayor. In the 2014 elections, Ali Kılıç, the CHP candidate, was elected mayor with 49.34% of the votes. Kılıç was re-elected in 2019. In 2024, the CHP held the municipality with Esin Köymen elected as the first female mayor to the district. Esin Köymen declared her resignation and joined New Party (Turkey, 2026) on 24th of October 2026.

== Transport ==
Metro

Ferry

- M4 Kadıköy - Sabiha Gökçen Airport metro line

Train Line

- Marmaray Train Line: Stations Küçükyalı, İdealtepe, Süreyya Plajı and Maltepe
- Princes' Islands - Maltepe
