= Maltepe metro station =

Station of the Istanbul Metro

Maltepe
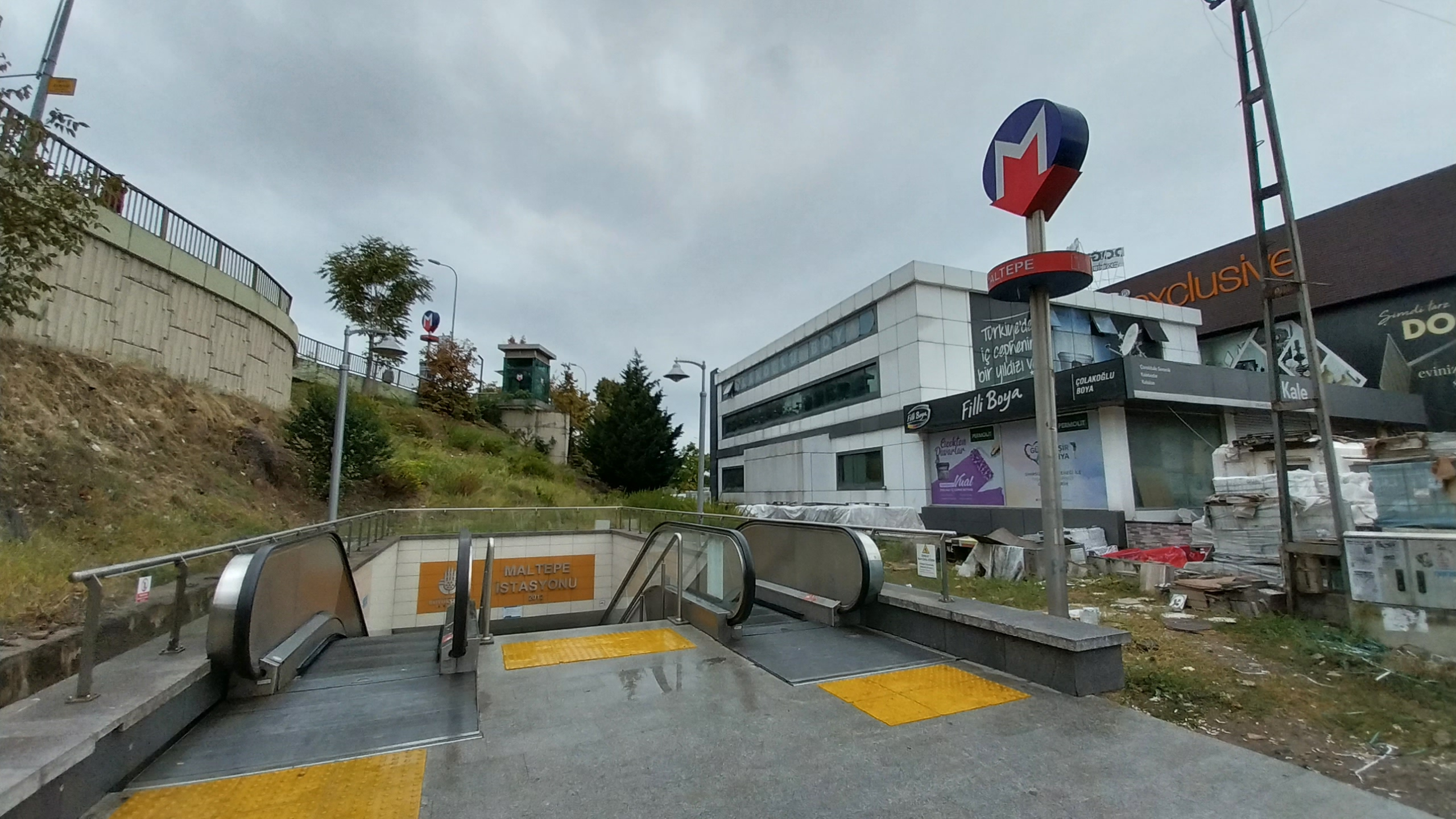

General information
- Location: Maltepe Kav., Zümrütevler Mah., 34852; Maltepe, Istanbul
- Coordinates: 40.9359°N 29.1392°E
- System: Istanbul Metro rapid transit station
- Owner: Istanbul Metropolitan Municipality
- Operator: Metro Istanbul
- Line: M4
- Platforms: 1 island platform
- Tracks: 2
- Connections: İETT Bus: 16A, 16B, 16C, 16KH, 16S, 16U, 16Y, 16Z, 17K, 17P, 21C, 21G, 21K, 21U, 130, 130A, 130Ş, 133N, 251, 500T, E-10, KM42, KM43, KM44; Istanbul Minibus: Harem-Gebze, Kadıköy-Kartal, Kadıköy-Uğur Mumcu, Maltepe-Başıbüyük, Maltepe-Büyükbakkalköy, Maltepe-Fındıklı Mahallesi

Construction
- Structure type: Underground
- Accessible: Yes

History
- Opened: 17 August 2012
- Electrified: 1,500 V DC Overhead line

Services
Preceding station	Istanbul Metro	Following station
Küçükyalı towards Kadıköy	M4 Line	Huzurevi towards Sabiha Gökçen Airport
Location

Maltepe is an underground station on the M4 line of the Istanbul Metro in Maltepe. It is located beneath the Maltepe Interchange, on the D.100 State Highway, in the Zümrütevler neighborhood. Connection to IETT city buses and Istanbul Minibus service is available. The station consists of an island platform with two tracks and was opened on 17 August 2012.

== Station Layout ==
P Platform level	Westbound	← toward Kadıköy
P Platform level	Island platform, doors will open on the left
P Platform level	Eastbound	toward Sabiha Gökçen Airport →
