= Acıbadem station =

Station of the Istanbul Metro

Acıbadem
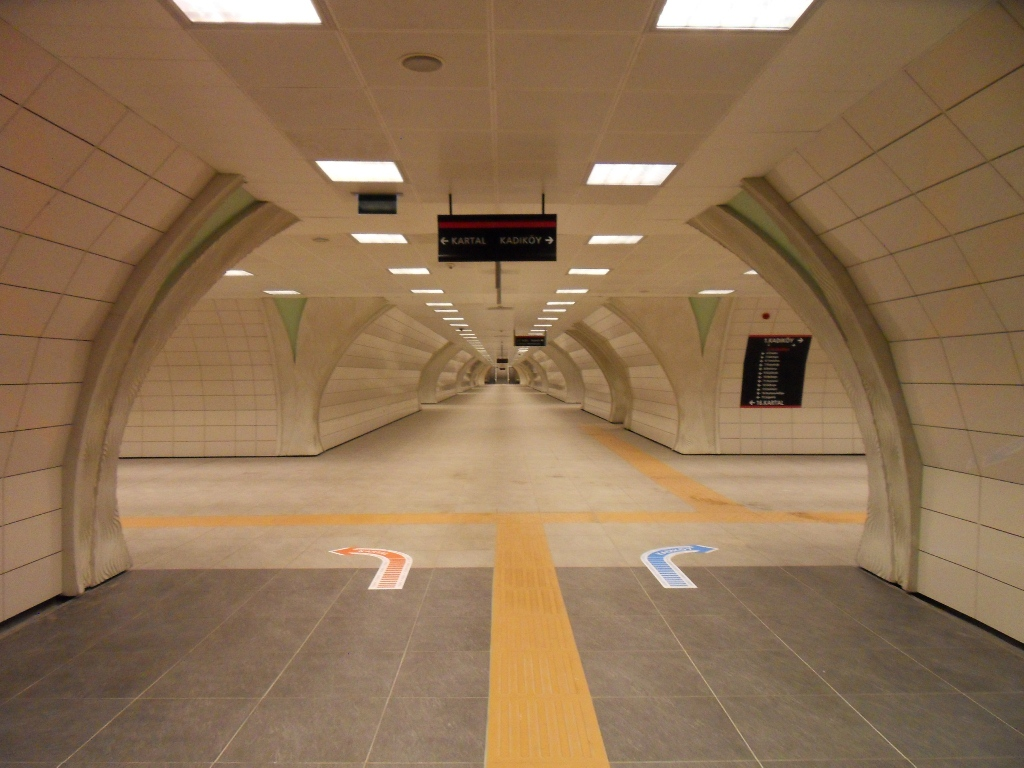
- The middle of the wide platform concourse.

General information
- Location: D.100, Acıbadem Mah. 34718; Kadıköy/Istanbul; Turkey
- Coordinates: 40.8883°N 29.2387°E
- System: Istanbul Metro rapid transit station
- Owner: Istanbul Metro
- Line: M4
- Platforms: 1 island platform
- Tracks: 2
- Connections: İETT Bus: 3A, 11T, 13M, 13Y, 14A, 14BK, 14DK, 15BK, 16A, 16B, 16C, 16F, 16KH, 16M, 16U, 16Y, 16Z, 17K, 18E, 18K, 18Y, 18Ü, 19, 19A, 19B, 19E, 19FK, 19H, 19T, 19Z, 20E, 20Ü, 21B, 21C, 21G, 21K, 21U, 130, 130A, 130Ş, 319, 320A, E-10, E-11; Istanbul Minibüs: Harem-Gebze; Kadıköy-Armağanevler; Kadıköy-Atakent; Kadıköy-Batı Ataşehir; Kadıköy-Bulgurlu; Kadıköy-Kartal; Kadıköy-Uğur Mumcu; Kadıköy-Yukarı Dudullu; Kadıköy-Özel Eyüboğlu Koleji; Üsküdar-Ataşehir; Üsküdar-Ferhatpaşa; Üsküdar-Kozyatağı

Construction
- Structure type: Underground
- Accessible: Yes

History
- Opened: 17 August 2012
- Electrified: 1,500 V DC Overhead line

Services
| Preceding station | Istanbul Metro | Following station |
|---|---|---|
| Ayrılık Çeşmesi towards Kadıköy | M4 Line | Ünalan towards Sabiha Gökçen Airport |
Location

Acıbadem is an underground station on the M4 line of the Istanbul Metro in the Acıbadem neighborhood of Kadıköy, Istanbul. Situated under the D.100 state highway, near Acıbadem Avenue. The station was opened on 17 August 2012 along with the Kadıköy-Kartal portion of the M4 line.

== Station Layout ==
| P Platform level | Westbound | ← toward Kadıköy |
| P Platform level | Island platform, doors will open on the left |
| P Platform level | Eastbound | toward Sabiha Gökçen Airport → |

== Connections ==
Connections to IETT Bus service are available via the Acıbadem Metro İst. bus stop. The following routes stop here:

- 3A — Kadıköy - Ünalan Mahallesi
- 11T — Türkiş Blokları - Üsküdar
- 13M — Üsküdar - Şerifali
- 13Y — Kadıköy - Çakmak Mahallesi/Yenisahra
- 14A — Kadıköy - Alemdağ
- 14BK — Kadıköy - Parseller Mahallesi
- 14DK — Kadıköy/Libadiye Caddesi - İnkılap Mahallesi
- 15BK — Kadıköy - Dereski/Beykoz
- 16A — Üküdar - Pendik
- 16B — Kadıköy - Kartal Metro/Topselvi
- 16C — Kadıköy - Hilal Konutları
- 16F — Üsküdar - Fındıklı Mahallesi
- 16KH — Kadıköy - Yenişehir/Marmara Üniv. Hastanesi
- 16M — Üsküdar - Ataşehir
- 16U — Üsküdar - Uğur Mumcu
- 16Y — Kadıköy - Yeşilbağlar
- 16Z — Kadıköy - Çamlık/Kartal Cezaevi
- 17K — Kadıköy - Kavakpınar
- 18E — Kadıköy - Yenidoğan/Samandıra
- 18K — Kadıköy - Sultanbeyli Gölet
- 18Ü — Üsküdar - Sultanbeyli
- 18V — Kadıköy - Veysel Karani/Samandıra
- 18Y — Üsküdar - Yenidoğan/Samandıra
- 19 — Kadıköy - Ferhatpaşa/Yeditepe Üniversitesi
- 19A — Ayrılıkçeşme - Yenidoğan
- 19B — Kadıköy - Başbüyük Mahallesi
- 19E — Kadıköy - Yenidoğan
- 19FK — Ayrılıkçeşme - Fındıklı Mahallesi
- 19H — Kadıköy - Marmara Eğtim Köyü
- 19T — Kadıköy - Ferhatpaşa
- 19Z — Kadıköy - Zümrütevler
- 20E — Kadıköy - Esatpaşa
- 20Ü — Kadıköy - Ümraniye Tepeüstü
- 21B — Kadıköy - Küçükbakkalköy
- 21C — Kadıköy - Esenkent
- 21G — Kadıköy - Gülensu Mahallesi
- 21K — Kadıköy - Kurfalı
- 21U — Kadıköy - Uğur Mumcu
- 130 — Kadıköy-Tuzla
- 130A — Kadıköy-Deniz Harp Okulu
- 130Ş — Kadıköy-Şifa Mahallesi
- 319 — Kadıköy - Kayışdağı
- 320A — Üsküdar - Sultanbeyli Mimarsinan/Samandıra
- E-10 — Kadıköy - S. Gökçen Havalimanı/Kurtköy ✈
- E-11 — Kadıköy - S. Gökçen Havalimanı ✈
