= Esenkent station =

Station of the Istanbul Metro

Esenkent

General information
- Location: D.100, Esenkent Mah., 34848; Maltepe, Istanbul
- Coordinates: 40.9207°N 29.1662°E
- System: Istanbul Metro rapid transit station
- Owner: Istanbul Metropolitan Municipality
- Operator: Metro Istanbul
- Line: M4
- Platforms: 1 island platform
- Tracks: 2
- Connections: İETT Bus: 16B, 16C, 16KH, 16S, 16U, 16Y, 16Z, 17K, 17P, 21K, 21U, 130, 130A, 130Ş, 500T, E-10, KM30, KM33; Istanbul Minibus: Harem-Gebze, Kadıköy-Uğur Mumcu

Construction
- Structure type: Underground
- Accessible: Yes

History
- Opened: 17 August 2012
- Electrified: 1,500 V DC Overhead line

Services
Preceding station	Istanbul Metro	Following station
Gülsuyu towards Kadıköy	M4 Line	Hastane–Adliye towards Sabiha Gökçen Airport
Location

Esenkent is an underground station on the M4 line of the Istanbul Metro in Maltepe. It is located beneath the D.100 State Highway, just west of the Cevizli interchange, in the Esenkent neighborhood and is the easternmost metro station in Maltepe. Connection to IETT city buses and Istanbul Minibus service is available. The station consists of an island platform with two tracks and was opened on 17 August 2012.

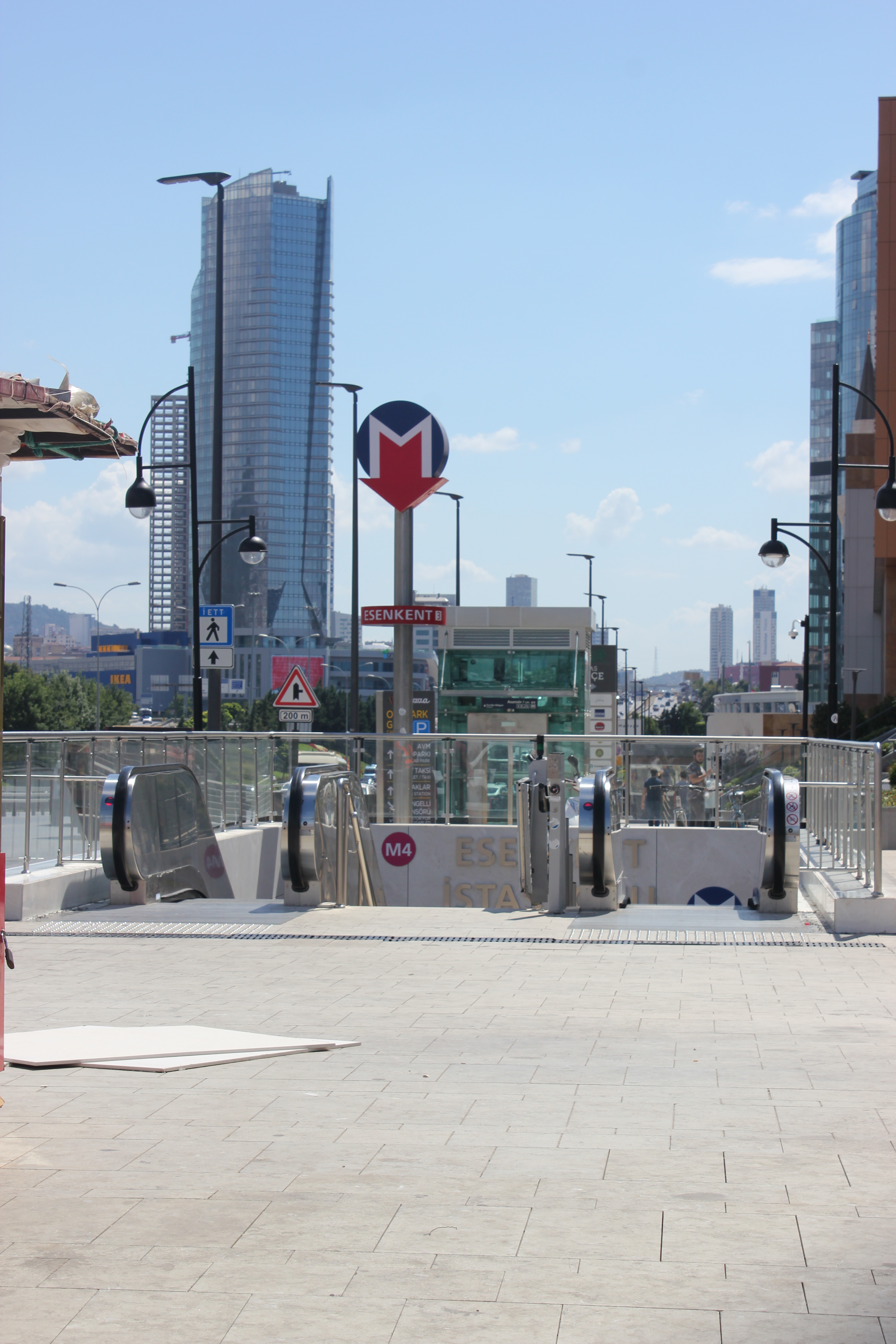
Esenkent (Istanbul Metro)

== Station Layout ==
P Platform level	Westbound	← toward Kadıköy
P Platform level	Island platform, doors will open on the left
P Platform level	Eastbound	toward Sabiha Gökçen Airport →
