= Pendik metro station =

Station of the Istanbul Metro

Pendik
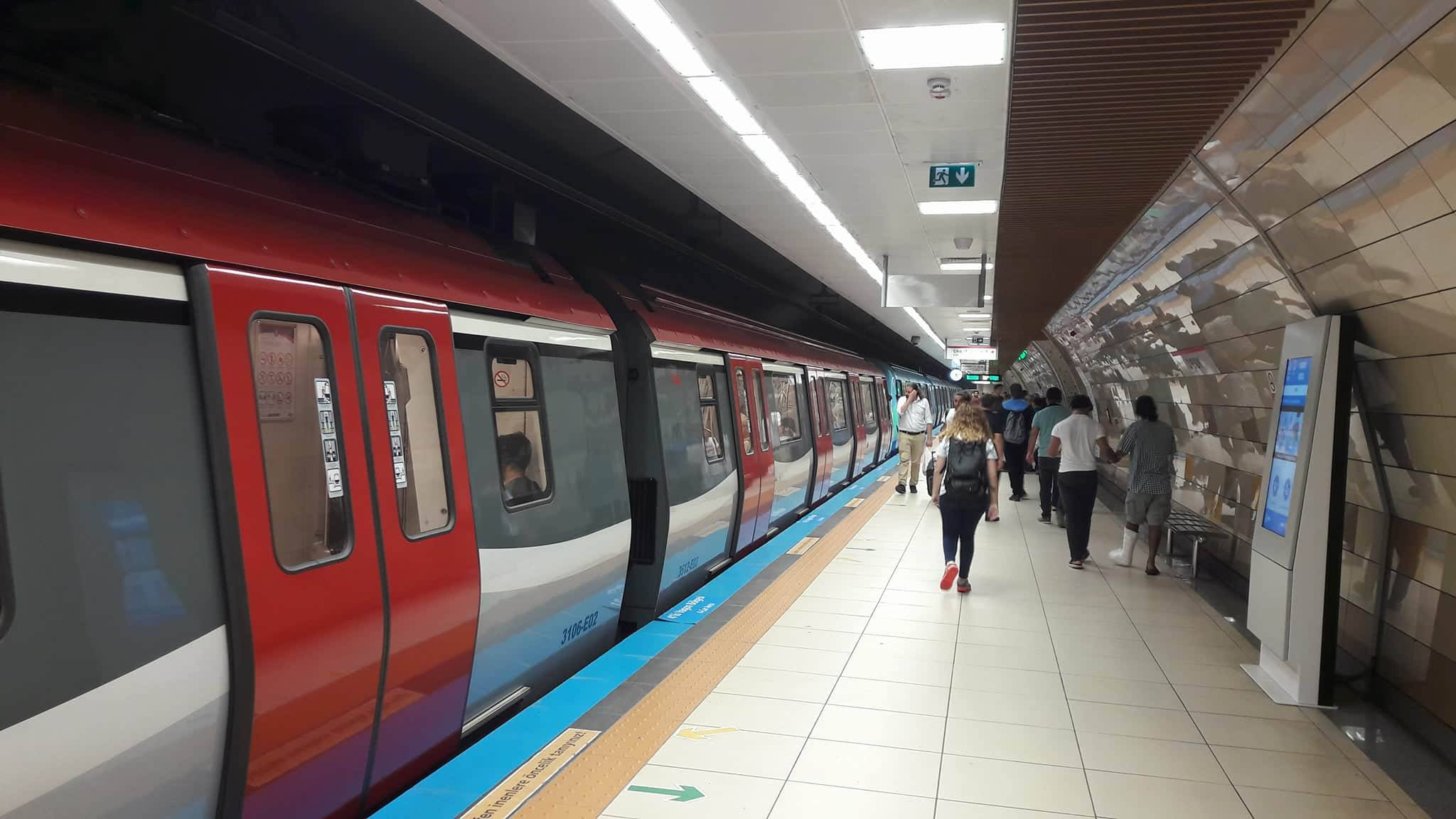
- An eastbound train departing the station.

General information
- Location: Pendik Kavşağı, Bahçelievler Mah., 34893; Pendik
- Coordinates: 40.8883°N 29.2387°E
- System: Istanbul Metro rapid transit station
- Owner: Istanbul Metro
- Line: M4
- Platforms: 1 Island platform
- Tracks: 2
- Connections: İETT Bus: 16C, 16KH, 16Z, 17K, 17P, 130, 130A, 130E, 130G, 130Ş, 132, 132A, 132B, 132D, 132E, 132H, 132K, 132P, 132G, 133GP, 132T, 132Y, 251, 500T, E-9, E-10, KM10, KM11, KM12, KM13, KM23, KM24, KM25, KM28, KM29; Istanbul Minibus: Harem-Gebze

Construction
- Structure type: Underground
- Accessible: Yes

History
- Opened: 10 October 2016
- Electrified: 1,500 V DC Overhead line

Services
Preceding station	Istanbul Metro	Following station
Yakacık–A. Kahveci towards Kadıköy	M4 Line	Tavşantepe towards Sabiha Gökçen Airport
Location

Pendik is an underground station on the M4 line of the Istanbul Metro. Located under the Pendik interchange on the D.100 in the Bahçelievler neighborhood of Pendik, Istanbul, it was opened on 10 October 2016 along with the 5 km (3.1 mi) expansion from Kartal to Pendik. It is the closest station to the Turkish State Railways' Pendik station, located 1 km (0.62 mi) south. IETT offers bus service to bridge the gap.

== Station Layout ==
P Platform level	Westbound	← toward Kadıköy
P Platform level	Island platform, doors will open on the left
P Platform level	Eastbound	toward Sabiha Gökçen Airport →

== Connections ==
Connections to IETT Bus service are available via the Pendik Köprüsü bus stop. The stop is located on the upper level (Ankara Cd.) and lower level (D.100). The following routes stop here:

- 132 — Akfırat/Tepeören - Kartal
- 132A — Çamlık Mahallesi - Kartal
- 132B — Akfırat Evleri - Kartal Metro
- 132D — Kurtdoğmuş/Ballıca - Kartal
- 132E — Emirli/Kurnaköy - Kartal
- 132H — Pendik YHT - Sabiha Gökçen Havalimanı ✈
- 132K — Yenişehir - Kartal
- 132P — Veysel Karani/Sultanbeyli - Kartal
- 133GP — Göçbeyli - Kartal
- KM28 — Okan Üniversitesi - Pendik YHT
