= Huzurevi station =

Station of the Istanbul Metro

Huzurevi
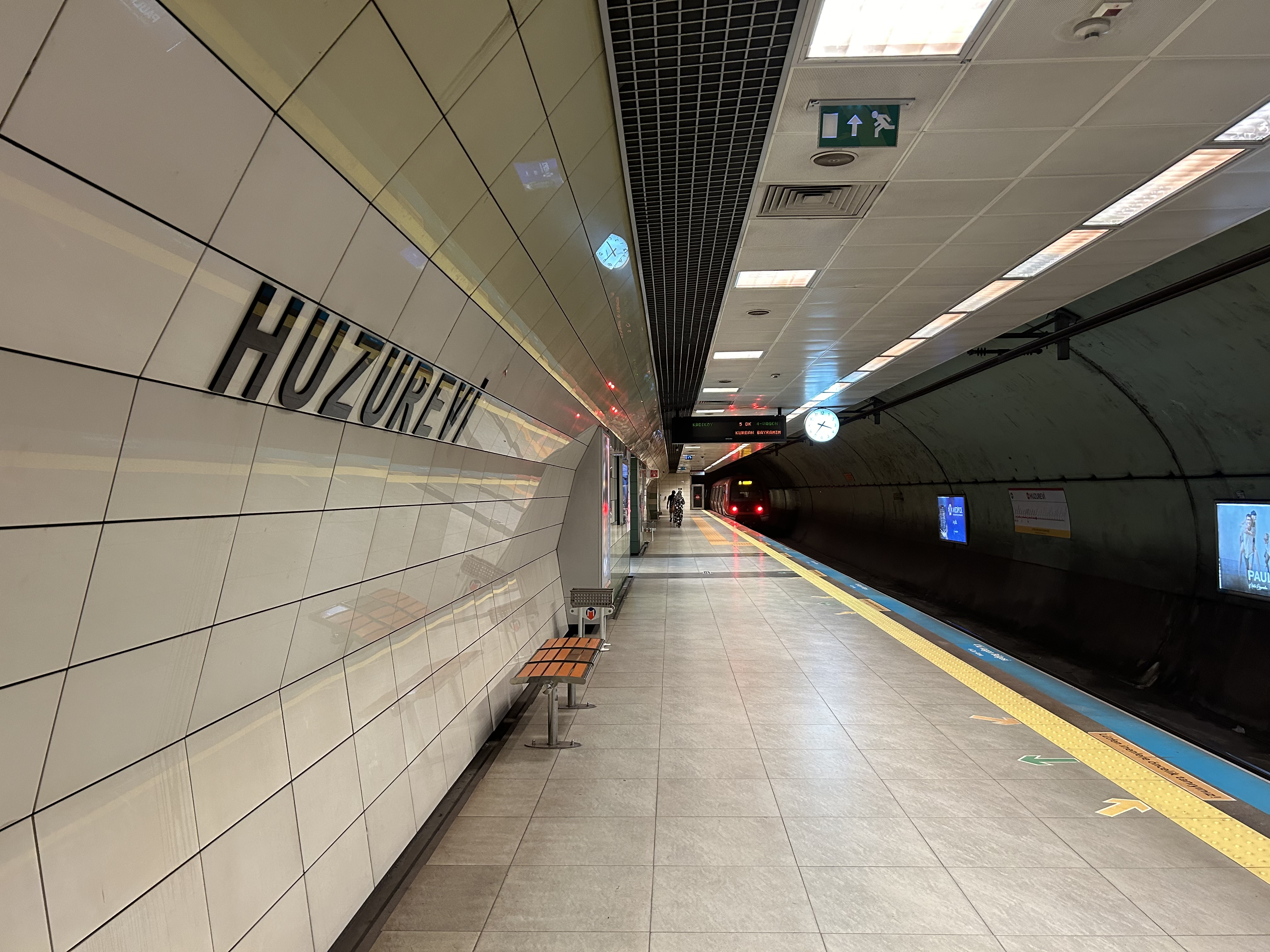

General information
- Location: D.100, Bağlarbaşı Mah., 34844; Maltepe, Istanbul
- Coordinates: 40.9298°N 29.1461°E
- System: Istanbul Metro rapid transit station
- Owner: Istanbul Metropolitan Municipality
- Operator: Metro Istanbul
- Line: M4
- Platforms: 1 island platform
- Tracks: 2
- Connections: İETT Bus: 16B, 16C, 16KH, 16S, 16U, 16Y, 16Z, 17K, 17P, 21C, 21G, 21K, 21U, 130, 130A, 130Ş, 133N, 136, 136R, 136Z, 251, 500T, E-10; Istanbul Minibus: Harem-Gebze, Kadıköy-Uğur Mumcu

Construction
- Structure type: Underground
- Accessible: Yes

History
- Opened: 17 August 2012; 14 years ago
- Electrified: 1,500 V DC Overhead line

Services
| Preceding station | Istanbul Metro | Following station |
|---|---|---|
| Maltepe towards Kadıköy | M4 Line | Gülsuyu towards Sabiha Gökçen Airport |
Location

Huzurevi is an underground station on the M4 line of the Istanbul Metro in Maltepe. It is located beneath the D.100 State Highway, in the Bağlarbaşı neighborhood. Connection to IETT city buses and Istanbul Minibus service is available. The station consists of an island platform with two tracks and was opened on 17 August 2012.

== Station Layout ==
| P Platform level | Westbound | ← toward Kadıköy (Maltepe) |
| P Platform level | Island platform, doors will open on the left |
| P Platform level | Eastbound | toward Sabiha Gökçen Airport (Gülsuyu) → |
