= Göztepe station (M4) =

Station of the Istanbul Metro

Göztepe
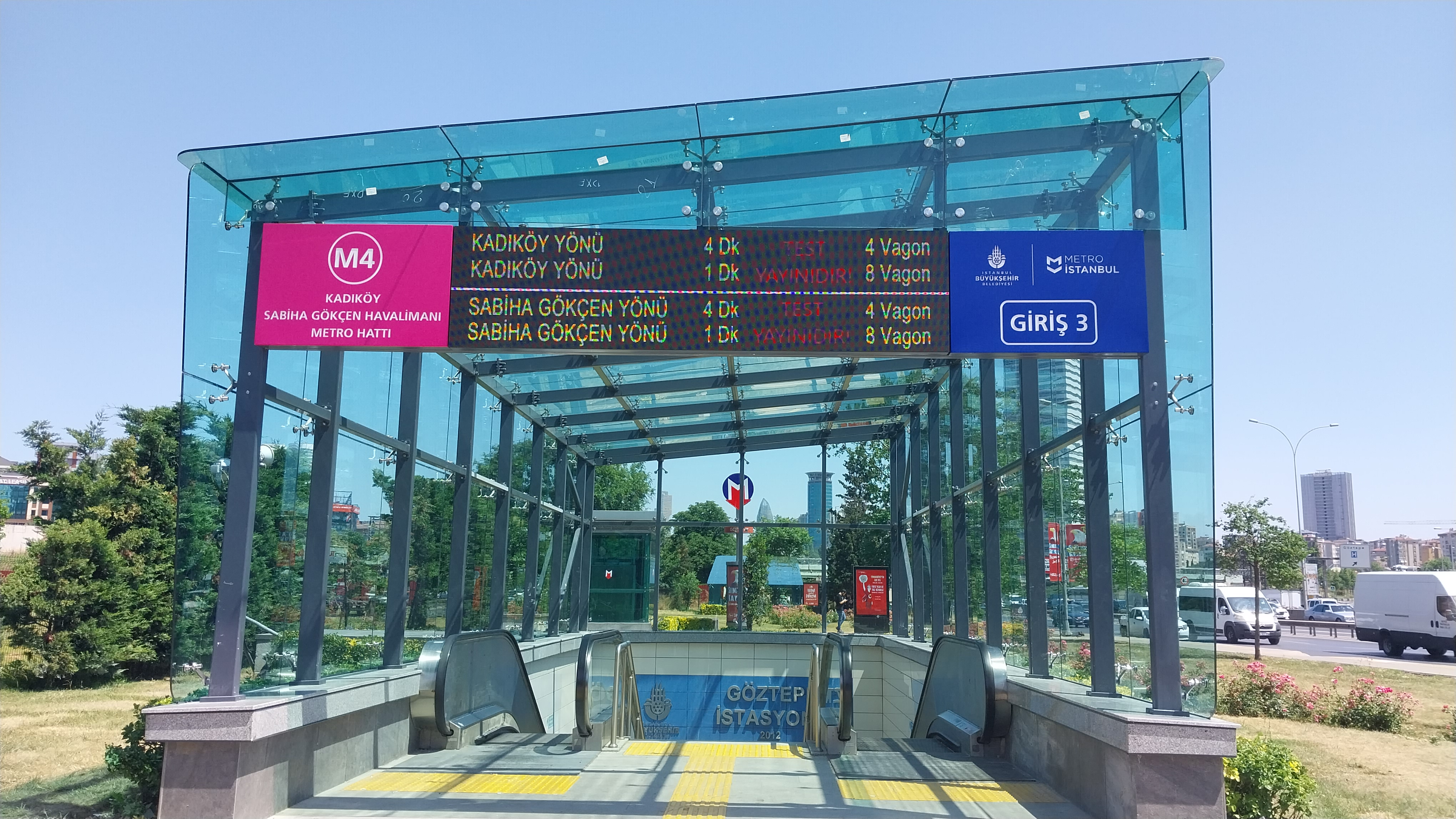

General information
- Location: Göztepe Kavşağı, Merdivenköy Mah., 34732; Kadıköy
- Coordinates: 40.9936°N 29.0703°E
- System: Istanbul Metro rapid transit station
- Owner: Istanbul Metropolitan Municipality
- Operator: Istanbul Metro
- Line: M4
- Platforms: 1 island platform
- Tracks: 2
- Connections: İETT Bus: 3A, 8E, 9K, 10E, 10G, 11T, 13M, 13Y, 14A, 14B, 14BK, 14ES, 15BK, 15ÇK, 15SK, 16A, 16B, 16C, 16F, 16KH, 16M, 16S, 16U, 16Y, 16Z, 17K, 17P, 18A, 18E, 18K, 18M, 18Ü, 18V, 18Y, 19, 19A, 19B, 19E, 19FK, 19H, 19T, 19Z, 20D, 20E, 20K, 20Ü, 21B, 21C, 21G, 21K, 21U, 129T, 130, 130A, 130Ş, 202, 251, 252, 319, 320A, E-10, E-11, Istanbul Minibüs: Harem-Gebze, Kadıköy-Armağanevler, Kadıköy-Atakent, Kadıköy-Batı Ataşehir, Kadıköy-Bulgurlu, Kadıköy-Kartal, Kadıköy-Uğur Mumcu, Kadıköy-Yukarı Dudullu, Kadıköy-Özel Eyüboğlu Koleji, Ümraniye-Göztepe Hastane, Üsküdar-Ataşehir, Üsküdar-Ferhatpaşa, Üsküdar-Kozyatağı

Construction
- Structure type: Underground
- Accessible: Yes

History
- Opened: 17 August 2012
- Electrified: 1,500 V DC Overhead line

Services
Preceding station	Istanbul Metro	Following station
Ünalan towards Kadıköy	M4 Line	Yenisahra towards Sabiha Gökçen Airport
Location

Göztepe is an underground station on the M4 line of the Istanbul Metro. Located under beneath the Göztepe Interchange in the Merdivenköy neighborhood of Kadıköy, Istanbul, it was opened on 17 August 2012.

== Station Layout ==
P Platform level	Westbound	← toward Kadıköy
P Platform level	Island platform, doors will open on the left
P Platform level	Eastbound	toward Sabiha Gökçen Airport →
