= Yakacık–Adnan Kahveci station =

Station of the Istanbul Metro

Yakacık - Adnan Kahveci

General information
- Location: D.100, Hürriyet Mah., 34876; Kartal, Istanbul
- Coordinates: 40.8949°N 29.2289°E
- System: Istanbul Metro rapid transit station
- Owner: Istanbul Metropolitan Municipality
- Operator: Metro Istanbul
- Line: M4
- Platforms: 1 island platform
- Tracks: 2
- Connections: İETT Bus: 16C, 16KH, 16Z, 17K, 17P, 130, 130A, 130E, 130Ş, 132G, 132Ş, 132T, 251, 500T, E-10, KM11, KM12, KM23, KM25, KM29; Istanbul Minibus: Harem-Gebze

Construction
- Structure type: Underground
- Accessible: Yes

History
- Opened: 10 October 2016
- Electrified: 1,500 V DC Overhead line

Services
Preceding station	Istanbul Metro	Following station
Kartal towards Kadıköy	M4 Line	Pendik towards Sabiha Gökçen Airport
Location

Yakacık - Adnan Kahveci is an underground station on the M4 line of the Istanbul Metro in Kartal. It is located beneath the D.100 State Highway in the Hürriyet neighborhood and is the easternmost station in Kartal. Connection to IETT city buses and Istanbul Minibus service is available. The station consists of an island platform with two tracks and was opened on 10 October 2016.

== Station Layout ==
P Platform level	Westbound	← toward Kadıköy
P Platform level	Island platform, doors will open on the left
P Platform level	Eastbound	toward Sabiha Gökçen Airport →
