= M4 (Istanbul Metro) =

Metro line in Istanbul

M4 Kadıköy–Sabiha Gökçen Airport
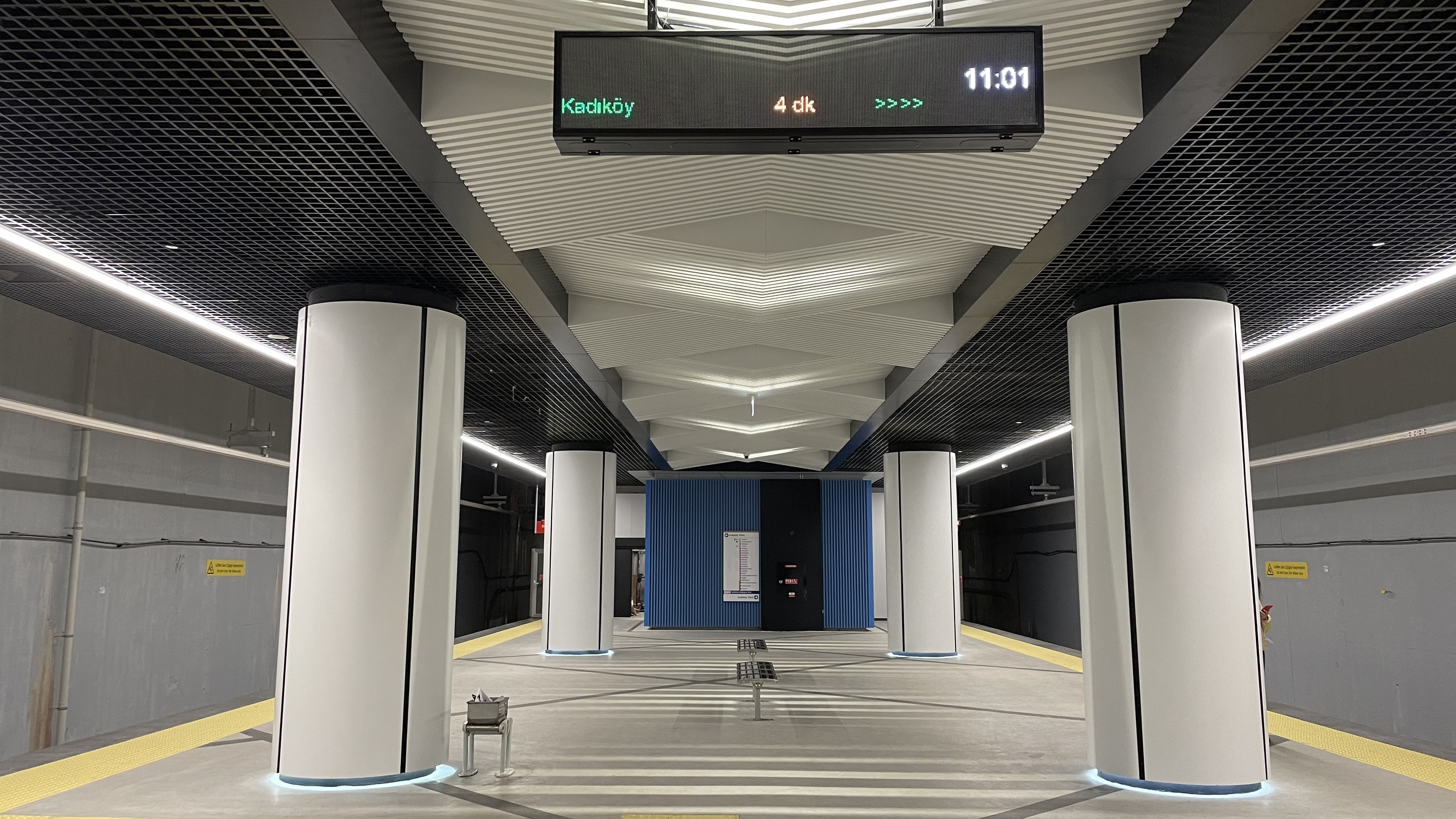
- Sabiha Gökçen Airport Station

Overview
- Status: Operational; Kadıköy - Sabiha Gökçen Airport; Under Construction; M4ʙ (Tavşantepe - Kaynarca Merkez); Projected; M4ʙ (Kaynarca Merkez - İçmeler/Tuzla Bld.); Planned; M4ᴀ (Sabiha Gökçen Air. - Kurtköy YHT/ViaPort); M4ʙ (İçmeler/Tuzla Bld. - Tuzla Sahil)
- Owner: Istanbul Metropolitan Municipality
- Locale: Istanbul, Turkey
- Termini: Kadıköy station, Kadıköy; Sabiha Gökçen Airport station, Pendik
- Stations: 23
- Website: M4

Service
- Type: Rapid transit
- System: Istanbul Metro
- Services: 1
- Route number: M4
- Operator: Metro Istanbul A.Ş.
- Depot: Maltepe
- Rolling stock: 144 CAF; 4 carriages per trainset
- Daily ridership: 134,524 (2013)

History
- Opened: 17 August 2012 (14 years ago)
- Last extension: 2 October 2022 (4 years ago)

Technical
- Line length: 33.5 km (20.8 mi)
- Number of tracks: 2
- Track gauge: 1,435 mm (4 ft 8 1/2 in) standard gauge
- Electrification: 1,500 V DC Overhead line
- Operating speed: 80 km/h (50 mph)

The M4, officially referred to as the M4 Kadıköy - Sabiha Gökçen Airport metro line (Turkish: M4 Kadıköy–Sabiha Gökçen Havalimanı metro hattı), is a 33.5-kilometre (20.8 mi), 23-station rapid transit line of the Istanbul Metro. It is colored deep pink on the maps and route signs. Running between Kadıköy and Sabiha Gökçen Airport, it is the first rapid transit line operating on the Asian side of Istanbul. The M4 mostly runs under State road D100, parallel to the Istanbul-Ankara railway and is entirely underground.

== History ==
A plan to build a subway line on the Asian side of İstanbul was approved in 2005. In 2008, a €751 million construction contract was awarded to a consortium of Astaldi, Makyol and Gülermak. The rolling stock was ordered from the Spanish company CAF. In mid-2010, the construction of the tunnels was completed and the track laying started. The route has connections with TCDD's Marmaray commuter rail at Ayrılık Çeşmesi and the Istanbul Metrobus system at Ünalan, as well as with line M8 of the metro system at Kozyatağı. The scheduled opening date was December 2011 up to Kartal, but it was postponed because of signalization works.

The M4 opened on 17 August 2012 with a large ceremony in Kadıköy, attended by Prime Minister Recep Tayyip Erdoğan. On 29 October 2013, with the opening of Marmaray rail service under the Bosphorus, Ayrılık Çeşmesi station was opened to allow passengers to transfer between lines. On 10 October 2016, 3 new stations were added to the line (Yakacık Station, Pendik Station and Tavşantepe Station). On 2 October 2022, 4 new stations were added to the line (Fevzi Çakmak Station, Yayalar Station, Kurtköy Station and Sabiha Gökçen Airport Station). Thus, the length of the line reached 33.5 km.

The addition of 100 new vehicles to the Kadıköy-Sabiha Gökçen Airport metro line fleet is undertaken by Bozankaya.

=== Opening timeline ===
Stage	Segment	Commencement	Length	Station(s)
1	Kadıköy – Kartal	17 August 2012	21.7 km (13.48 mi)	16
2	Kartal – Tavşantepe	10 October 2016	4.4 km (2.73 mi)	3
3	Tavşantepe – Sabiha Gökçen Airport	2 October 2022	7.4 km (4.60 mi)	4
4	Tavşantepe – Kaynarca Merkez	Early 2027 (expected)	1.1 km (0.68 mi)	1

== Stations ==
The M4 has a total of 23 stations in operation, with 6 more under construction.

M4 route diagram with M4A and M4B branches

M4 Kadıköy - Sabiha Gökçen Airport
Station	District	Opened	Connections
Kadıköy	Kadıköy	17 August 2012	Istanbul nostalgic tramways: Şehir Hatları; İDO; Turyol; İETT Bus: 1, 3, 3A, 3B, 8, 8A, 11D, 12A, 12H, 13, 13B, 13Y, 14, 14A, 14C, 14D, 14DK, 14E, 14F, 14K, 14KS, 14M, 14R, 14S, 14ŞB, 14Y, 15BK, 15F, 15TK, 16, 16D, 16K, 16KH, 16Y, 17, 17L, 18K, 19, 19EK, 19F, 19S, 21A, 21C, 21G, 21K, 21U, 110, 120M, 125, 130Ş, 222, 319, 500A, 500T; Havabüs
Ayrılık Çeşmesi	Kadıköy	29 October 2013	TCDD Transport: Marmaray
Acıbadem	Kadıköy	17 August 2012	İETT Bus: 3A, 11T, 13M, 13Y, 14A, 14BK, 14DK, 15BK, 16A, 16B, 16C, 16F, 16KH, 16M, 16U, 16Y, 16Z, 17K, 18E, 18K, 18Y, 18Ü, 19, 19A, 19B, 19E, 19FK, 19H, 19T, 19Z, 20E, 20Ü, 21B, 21C, 21G, 21K, 21U, 130, 130A, 130Ş, 319, 320A, E-10, E-11
Ünalan	Kadıköy	17 August 2012	Metrobus: 34A, 34AS, 34G, 34Z; İETT Bus: 3A, 11T, 130, 13M, 13Y, 14A, 14BK, 14DK, 15BK, 16A, 16, B, 16C, 16F, 16KH, 16M, 16S, 16U, 16Y, 16Z, 17K, 17P, 18A, 18E, 18K, 18M, 18Ü, 18V, 18Y, 19, 19A, 19B, 19E, 19FK, 19H, 19T, 19Z, 20E, 20Ü, 21B, 21C, 21G, 21K, 21U, 130A, 130Ş, 319, 320A, E-10, E-11; Havabüs
Göztepe	Kadıköy	17 August 2012	İETT Bus: 3A, 8E, 9K, 10E, 10G, 11T, 13M, 13Y, 14A, 14B, 14BK, 14ES, 15BK, 15ÇK, 15SK, 16A, 16B, 16C, 16F, 16KH, 16M, 16S, 16U, 16Y, 16Z, 17K, 17P, 18A, 18E, 18K, 18M, 18Ü, 18V, 18Y, 19, 19A, 19B, 19E, 19FK, 19H, 19T, 19Z, 20D, 20E, 20K, 20Ü, 21B, 21C, 21G, 21K, 21U, 129T, 130, 130A, 130Ş, 202, 251, 252, 319, 320A, E-10, E-11
Yenisahra	Kadıköy	17 August 2012	Istanbul Metro: (under construction); İETT Bus: 8A, 8Y; Havabüs
Kozyatağı	Kadıköy	17 August 2012	Istanbul Metro: İETT Bus: 14KS, 14T, 15KB, 16A, 16B, 16C, 16F, 16FK, 16KH, 16S, 16U, 16Y, 16Z, 17K, 17P, 19, 19B, 19FK, 19H, 19Z, 21B, 21C, 21G, 21K, 21U, 129L, 129T, 130, 130A, 130Ş, 251, 252, 319, 500T, E-10
Bostancı	Kadıköy	17 August 2012	İETT Bus: 10, 13AB, 14KS, 14T, 15KB, 16A, 16B, 16C, 16F, 16KH, 16S, 16U, 16Y, 16Z, 17K, 17P, 19, 19B, 19D, 19FK, 19H, 19SB, 19Z, 21B, 21C, 21G, 21K, 21U, 129L, 130, 130A, 130Ş, 251, 319, 500T, E-10
Küçükyalı	Maltepe	17 August 2012	İETT Bus: 16A, 16B, 16C, 16KH, 16S, 16U, 16Y, 16Z, 17K, 17P, 19B, 19H, 19Z, 21C, 21G, 21K, 21U, 130, 130A, 130Ş, 251, 500T, KM41, KM45
Maltepe	Maltepe	17 August 2012	İETT Bus: 16A, 16B, 16C, 16KH, 16S, 16U, 16Y, 16Z, 17K, 17P, 21C, 21G, 21K, 21U, 130, 130A, 130Ş, 133N, 251, 500T, E-10, KM42, KM43, KM44
Huzurevi	Maltepe	17 August 2012	İETT Bus: 16B, 16C, 16KH, 16S, 16U, 16Y, 16Z, 17K, 17P, 21C, 21G, 21K, 21U, 130, 130A, 130Ş, 133N, 136, 136R, 136Z, 251, 500T, E-10
Gülsuyu	Maltepe	17 August 2012	İETT Bus: 16B, 16C, 16KH, 16S, 16U, 16Y, 16Z, 17K, 17P, 21K, 21U, 130, 130A, 130Ş, 133N, 251, 500T, E-10
Esenkent	Maltepe	17 August 2012	İETT Bus: 16B, 16C, 16KH, 16S, 16U, 16Y, 16Z, 17K, 17P, 21K, 21U, 130, 130A, 130Ş, 500T, E-10, KM30, KM33
Hastane–Adliye	Kartal	17 August 2012	İETT Bus: 16C, 16KH, 16S, 16U, 16Z, 17K, 17P, 21K, 17S, 21K, 21U, 130, 130A, 130E, 130Ş, 132G, 134YK, 251, 500T, E-10, KM11, KM21, KM23, KM25, KM29, KM32, KM60, KM70, KM71
Soğanlık	Kartal	17 August 2012	İETT Bus: 16C, 16KH, 16S, 16Z, 17K, 17P, 21K, 130, 130A, 130E, 130Ş, 132G, 132M, 134GK, 251, 500T, E-10, KM11, KM12, KM21, KM23, KM25, KM29, KM32, KM60, KM70, KM71
Kartal	Kartal	17 August 2012	İETT Bus: 16C, 16KH, 16S, 16Z, 17K, 17P, 21K, 130, 130A, 130E, 130Ş, 131K, 131V, 131Y, 132C, 132ÇK, 132G, 132M, 132N, 132S, 132T, 132Y, 132Z, 134, 134CK, 134GK, 134K, 134UK, 251, 500T, E-10, KM11, KM12, KM21, KM23, KM25, KM29, KM31, KM32, KM60, KM70, KM71
Yakacık–Adnan Kahveci	Kartal	10 October 2016	İETT Bus: 16C, 16KH, 16Z, 17K, 17P, 130, 130A, 130E, 130Ş, 132G, 132Ş, 132T, 251, 500T, E-10, KM11, KM12, KM23, KM25, KM29
Pendik	Pendik	10 October 2016	İETT Bus: 16C, 16KH, 16Z, 17K, 17P, 130, 130A, 130E, 130G, 130Ş, 132, 132A, 132B, 132D, 132E, 132H, 132K, 132P, 132G, 133GP, 132T, 132Y, 251, 500T, E-9, E-10, KM10, KM11, KM12, KM13, KM23, KM24, KM25, KM28, KM29
Tavşantepe	Pendik	10 October 2016	İETT Bus: 16KH, 17K, 17P, 130, 130A, 130E, 130Ş, 132F, 132T, 132Y, 500T, E-9, KM2, KM10, KM11, KM12, KM13, KM14, KM23, KM24, KM29
Fevzi Çakmak-Hastane	Pendik	2 October 2022	İETT Bus: 16KH, 132P, 132V, 132Y, KM29
Yayalar–Şeyhli	Pendik	2 October 2022	İETT Bus: 16KH, 132, 132A, 132B, 132D, 132E, 132H, 133GP, 133Ü, E-10, KM18, KM25, KM27, KM28, KM29
Kurtköy	Pendik	2 October 2022	İETT Bus: 16KH, 132, 132A, 132B, 132D, 132E, 132H, 133GP, 133Ü, E-10, KM18, KM25, KM27, KM28, KM29, KM37
Sabiha Gökçen Airport	Pendik	2 October 2022	TCDD Taşımacılık: Yüksek Hızlı Tren (planned); İETT Bus: E-3, E-9, E-10, E-11; Havabüs SG-1, SG-2

== Specifications ==
Kadıköy, Ayrılıkçeşmesi, Ünalan and Göztepe stations are situated below sea level. The average distance between the stations is 1,300 m (1,400 yd). The distance between the stations at Maltepe and Huzurevi is the shortest at 800 m (870 yd). The distance between Bostancı and Küçükyalı is the longest with 2,300 m (2,500 yd). The Operation Control Center of the line is situated in Esenkent and the depot is located in Maltepe. Another depot is to be built in Kaynarca when the line extends there.

Train frequency is currently every 5 minutes during peak hours and technically could be shortened to 90 seconds. Trains remain at stations for an average of 15 seconds. Ridership capacity in one direction is 70,000 passengers hourly. Total travel time of the entire line is around 52 minutes.

== Rolling stock ==
=== CAF trains ===
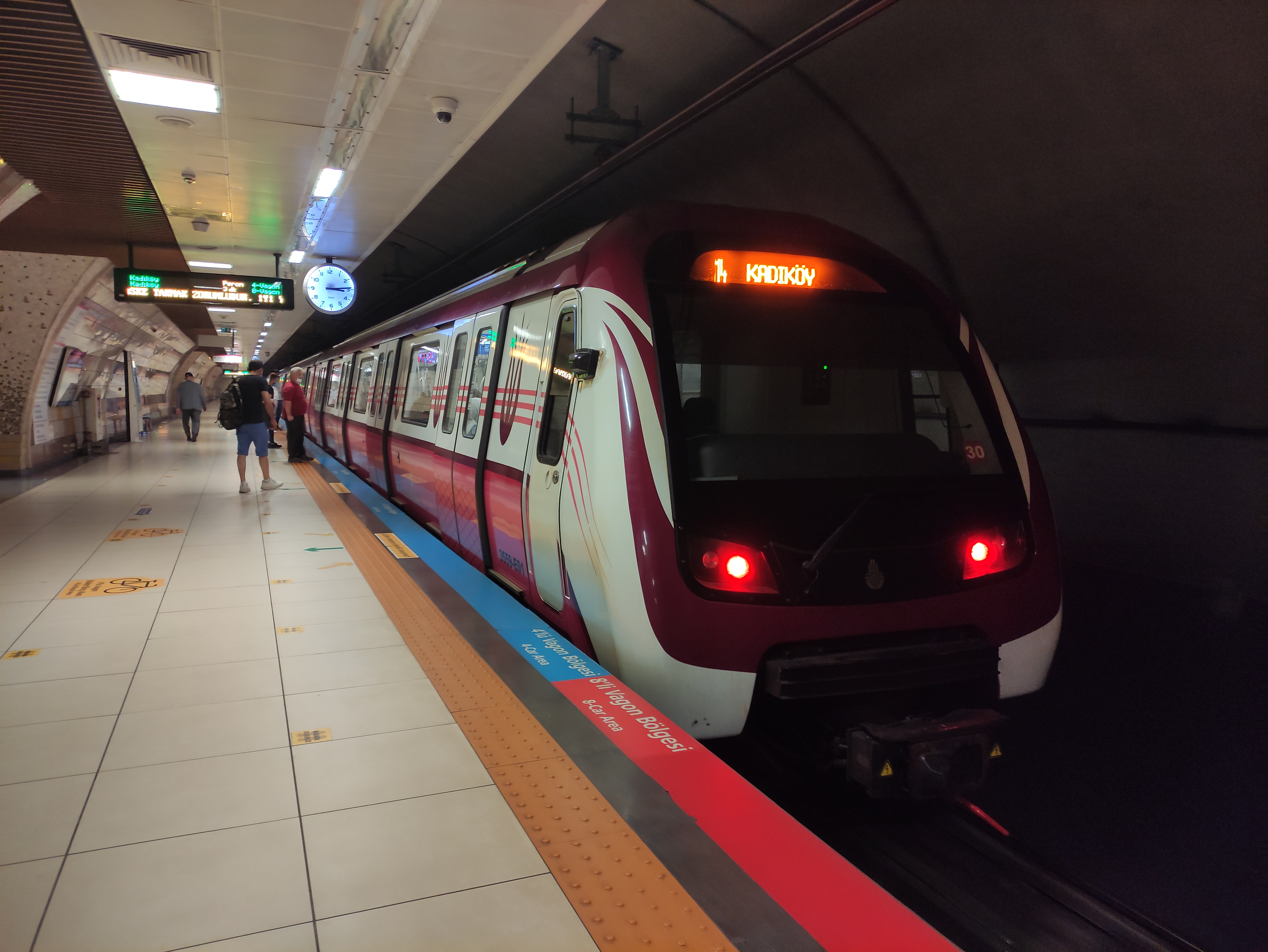
A Kadıköy-bound CAF train at Pendik station, 2021

In September 2009, the Spanish rail vehicle manufacturer CAF was awarded a contract to supply 30 four-car trains for the line, or 120 cars in total. Later, this order was increased by six trains, for a total of 144 cars. Deliveries of the trains took place from 2011 to 2012. The trains have a maximum speed of 80 kilometres per hour (50 mph) and a total capacity of 1,309 passengers. Out of the total of 36 trains, there are four different exterior and interior designs used.

=== Bozankaya trains ===
Bozankaya cars (middle) at the Behiç Erkin Yard, July 2026

In order to increase capacity on the line following its extension to Sabiha Gökçen Airport in 2022, 25 four-car trains were ordered from Turkish manufacturer Bozankaya to operate on both the M4 and M10 lines in July 2023. The trains, which have a capacity of 1,366 passengers and a maximum speed of 80 kilometres per hour (50 mph), will be capable of operating at the GoA2 (semi-automatic) level of automatic train operation. They are being constructed at Bozankaya's facility in Ankara. The first trainset was delivered in July 2026, with dynamic testing beginning later in August. All 100 cars are planned to be in Istanbul by mid-2027.

== See also ==
- Istanbul modern tramways
- Istanbul nostalgic tramways
- Marmaray
- Public transport in Istanbul
- Istanbul Metro
