= Hastane–Adliye station =

Station of the Istanbul Metro

Hastane-Adliye
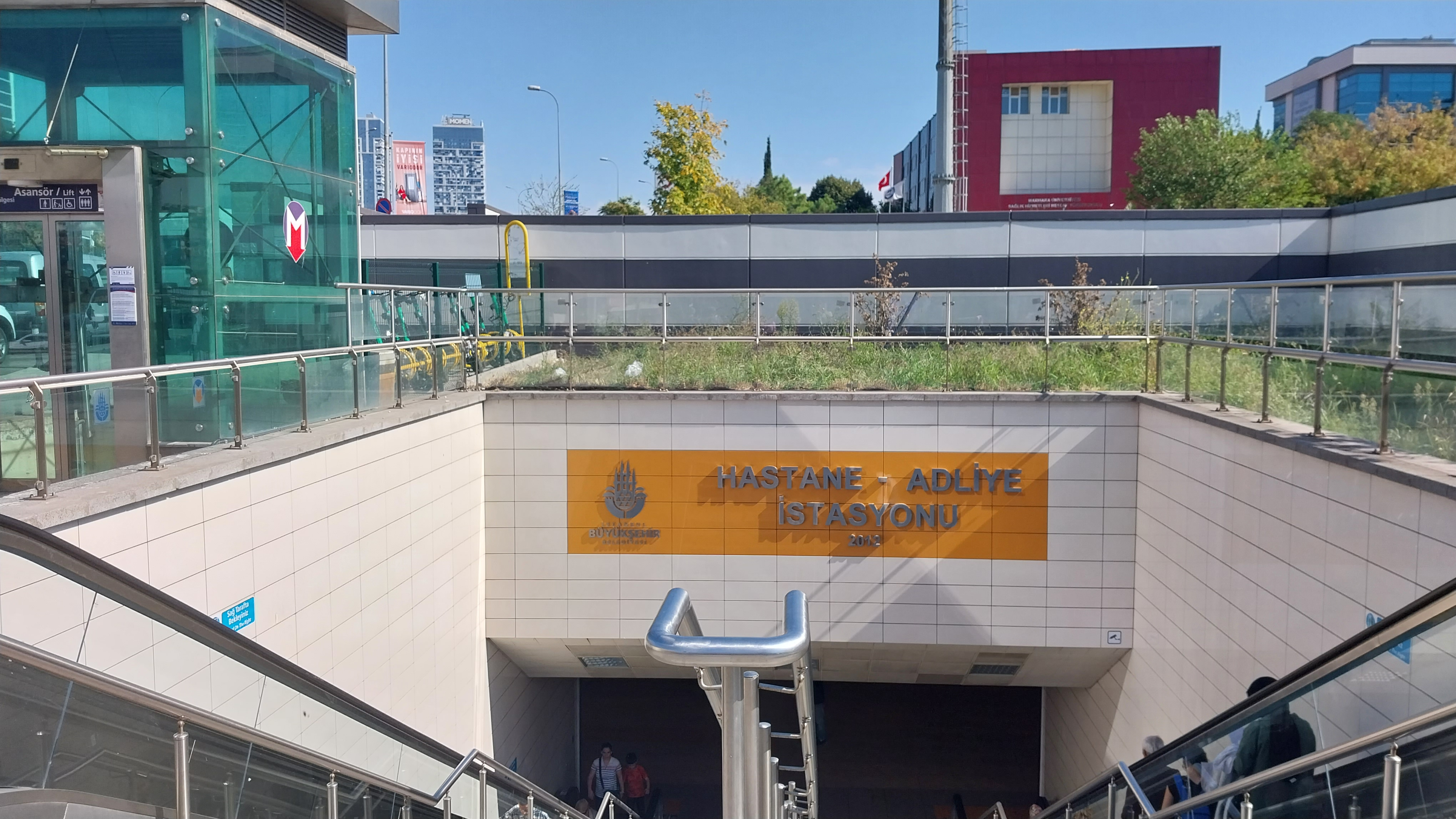

General information
- Location: D.100, Cevizli Mah., 34865; Kartal, Istanbul
- Coordinates: 40.9151°N 29.1815°E
- System: Istanbul Metro rapid transit station
- Owner: Istanbul Metropolitan Municipality
- Operator: Metro Istanbul
- Line: M4
- Platforms: 1 island platform
- Tracks: 2
- Connections: İETT Bus: 16C, 16KH, 16S, 16U, 16Z, 17K, 17P, 21K, 17S, 21K, 21U, 130, 130A, 130E, 130Ş, 132G, 134YK, 251, 500T, E-10, KM11, KM21, KM23, KM25, KM29, KM32, KM60, KM70, KM71; Istanbul Minibus: Harem-Gebze, Kadıköy-Uğur Mumcu

Construction
- Structure type: Underground
- Accessible: Yes

History
- Opened: 17 August 2012
- Electrified: 1,500 V DC Overhead line

Services
Preceding station	Istanbul Metro	Following station
Esenkent M4 towards Kadıköy	M4 Line	Soğanlık towards Sabiha Gökçen Airport
Location

Hastane - Adliye is an underground station on the M4 line of the Istanbul Metro in Kartal. It is located beneath the D.100 State Highway in the Esenkent neighborhood and is the westernmost metro station in Kartal. Connection to IETT city buses and Istanbul Minibus service is available. The station consists of an island platform with two tracks and was opened on 17 August 2012.

== Station Layout ==
P Platform level	Westbound	← toward Kadıköy
P Platform level	Island platform, doors will open on the left
P Platform level	Eastbound	toward Sabiha Gökçen Airport →
