= Esenkent =

Esenkent can refer to:

- Esenkent, Elâzığ
- Esenkent (M4) station
