= Ayrılık Çeşmesi metro station =

Station of the Istanbul Metro

Ayrılık Çeşmesi
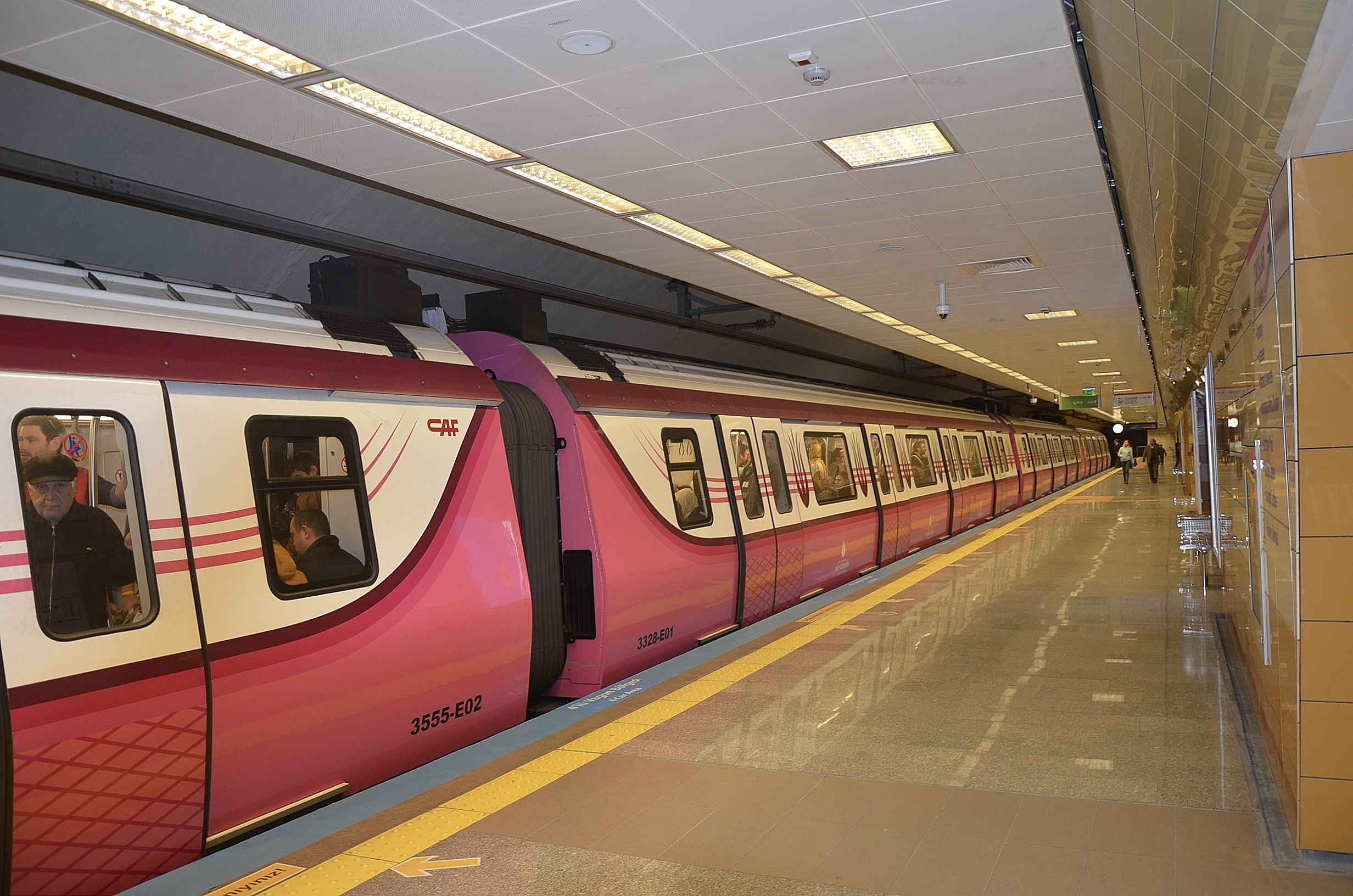

General information
- Coordinates: 41.000371°N 29.029972°E
- System: Istanbul Metro rapid transit station
- Owner: Istanbul Metro
- Line: M4
- Platforms: 1 island platform
- Tracks: 2
- Connections: TCDD Taşımacılık: Marmaray at Ayrılık Çeşmesi

Construction
- Structure type: Underground
- Depth: 28 m (92 ft)
- Accessible: Yes

History
- Opened: 29 October 2013
- Electrified: 1,500 V DC Overhead line

Services
| Preceding station | Istanbul Metro | Following station |
|---|---|---|
| Kadıköy Terminus | M4 Line | Acıbadem towards Sabiha Gökçen Airport |
Location

Ayrılık Çeşmesi is an underground station on the M4 line of the Istanbul Metro. It was opened on 29 October 2013 to provide a connection to the Marmaray station and trains crossing the Bosphorus, a year after the rest of the line's first stage (which opened on 17 August 2012). Ayrılık Çeşmesi has an island platform serviced by two tracks.

== Station Layout ==
| P Platform level | Westbound | ← toward Kadıköy |
| P Platform level | Island platform, doors will open on the left |
| P Platform level | Eastbound | toward Sabiha Gökçen Airport → |
