= Makyol =

Turkish construction company

Makyol is a Turkish construction company. It builds roads, metro lines, and airports. It is said by opposition MPs to have close links to the Turkish government and to have won some public construction contracts in special invitation tenders rather than open tenders.
