= Kadıköy station =

Station of the Istanbul Metro

Kadıköy
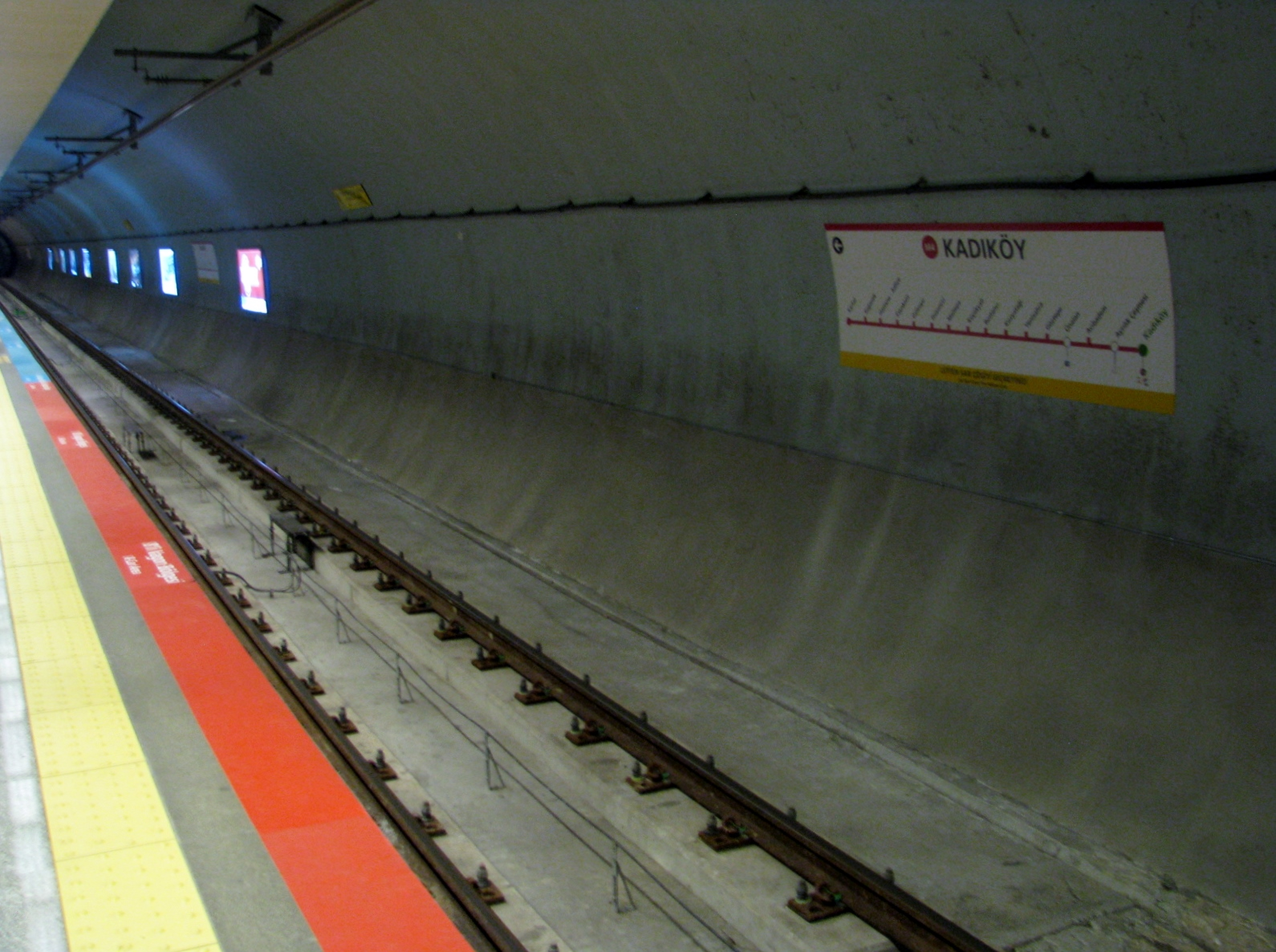

General information
- Location: Haydarpaşa Rıhtım Caddesi; Kadıköy, Istanbul 34710
- Coordinates: 40.991113°N 29.020906°E
- Owner: Istanbul Metro
- Line: M4
- Platforms: 1 island platform
- Tracks: 2 (M4)
- Connections: Kadıköy-Moda Heritage tram Şehir Hatları at Kadıköy Pier; İDO at Kadıköy Terminal; Turyol at Çayırbaşı Pier and Kadıköy Pier İETT Bus: 1, 3, 3A, 3B, 8, 8A, 11D, 12A, 12H, 13, 13B, 14, 14A, 14C, 14D, 14DK, 14E, 14F, 14K, 14KS, 14R, 14S, 14ŞB, 14Y, 16, 16D, 16K, 16KH, 16Y, 17, 17L, 18K, 19, 19F, 19S, 21A, 21C, 21G, 21K, 21U, 110, 120M, 125, 130Ş, 222, 319, 500A, 500T

Construction
- Structure type: Underground
- Accessible: Yes

History
- Opened: 17 August 2012
- Electrified: 1,500 V DC Overhead line

Services
Preceding station	Istanbul Metro	Following station
Terminus	M4 Line	Ayrılık Çeşmesi towards Sabiha Gökçen Airport
Location

Kadıköy is the western terminal station on the M4 line of the Istanbul Metro. Located beneath Haydarpaşa Rıhtım Caddesi (Street) it is serviced by the M4 between 6:00 and 0:04. The station has two tracks serving an island platform. Kadıköy opened on 17 August 2012 along with fifteen other stations on the M4 line. The Turkish Prime Minister Recep Tayyip Erdoğan along with the Mayor of Istanbul, Kadir Topbaş and other members of government inaugurated the line from Kadıköy and boarded a train to Kartal.

Kadıköy harbor is right next to the stations entrances. Ferry service offered by the municipal ferry service, Şehir Hatları (City Lines), as well the private line operator, Turyol. İDO operates SeaBus ferry service to piers on the Marmara coast of the city. İETT has a large city bus hub next to the harbor and station and operates buses to many parts of the Asian side of Istanbul.

== Station Layout ==
P Platform level	Eastbound	toward Sabiha Gökçen Airport →
P Platform level	Island platform, doors will open on the left
P Platform level	Eastbound	toward Sabiha Gökçen Airport →

== Gallery ==
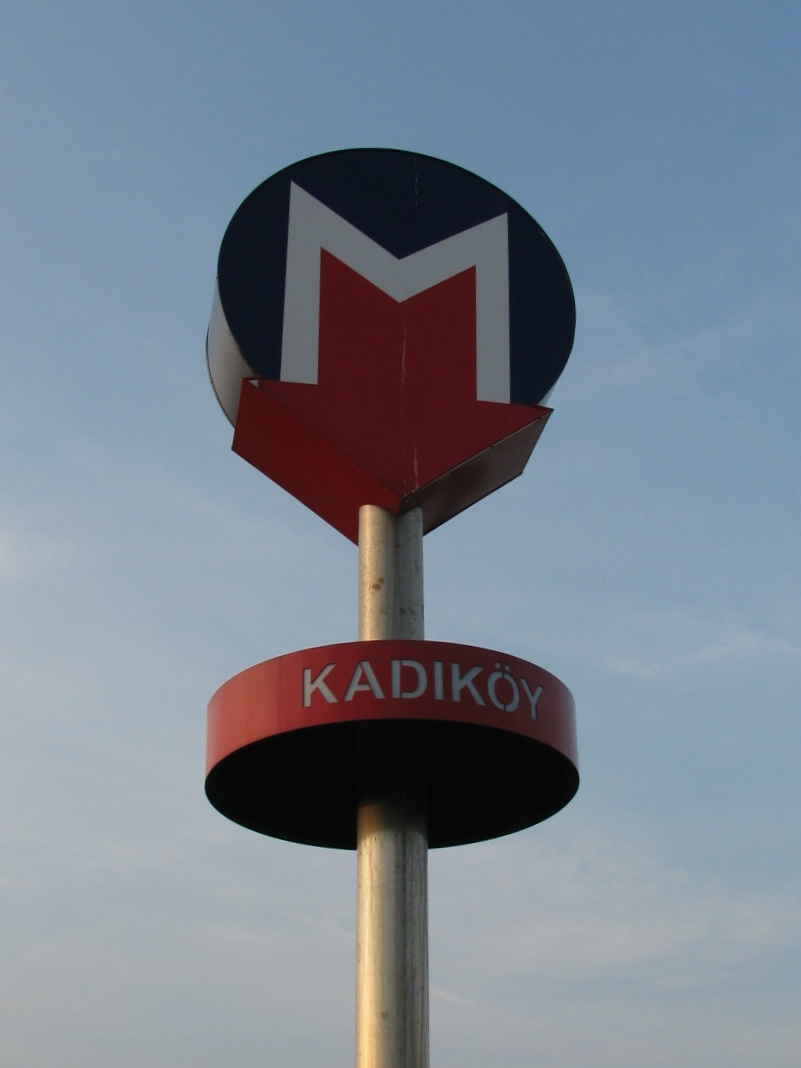
Kadıköy metro sign.

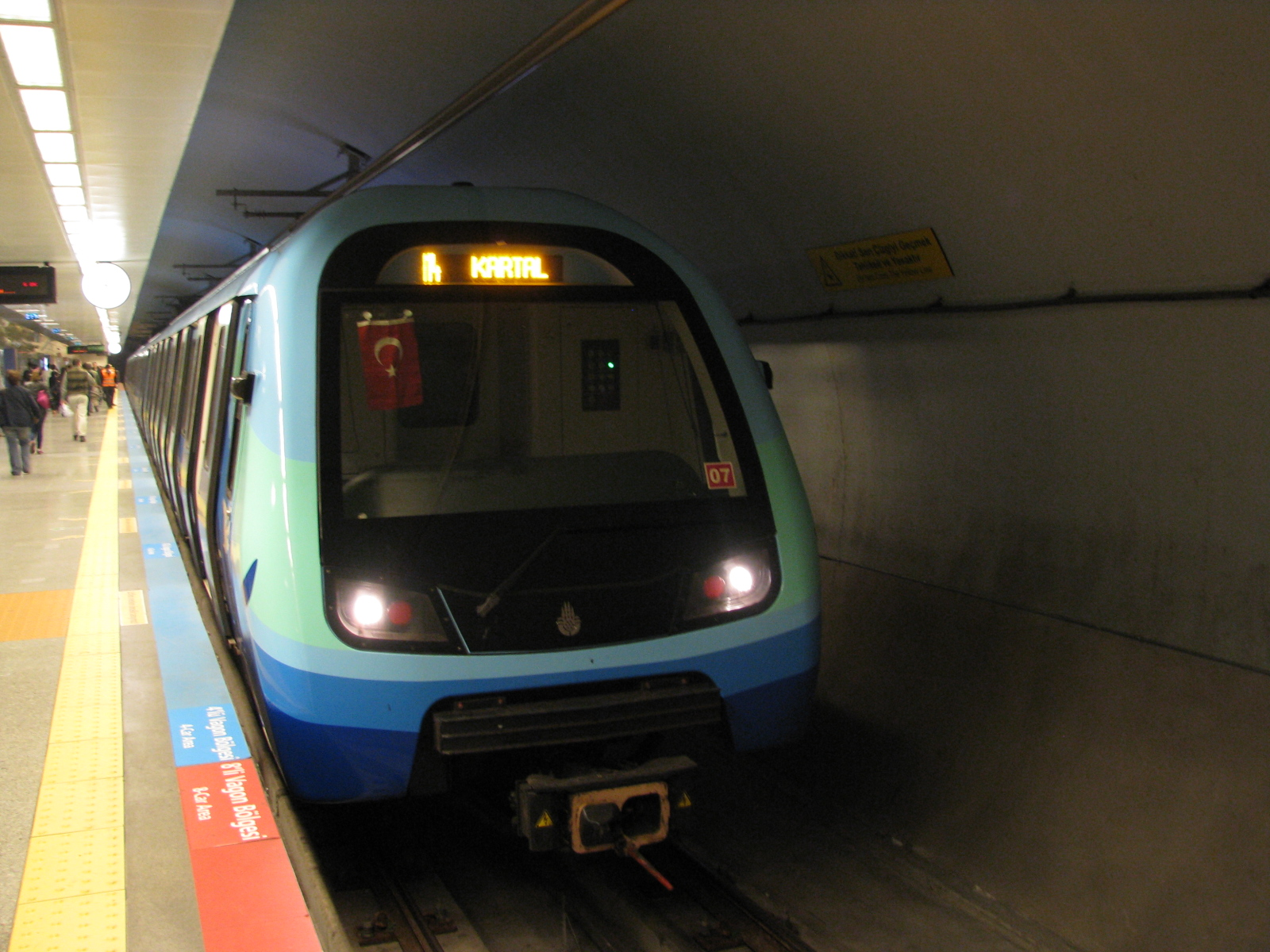
A CAF built EMU at the station.

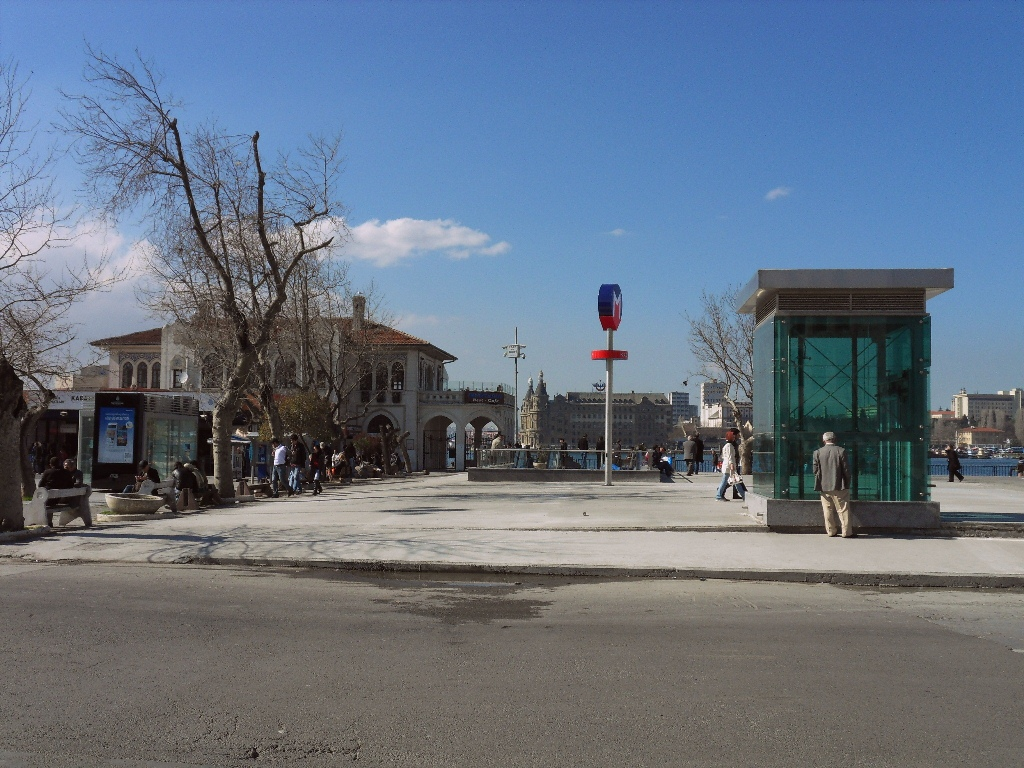
The station entrance with Kadıköy harbor and Haydarpaşa Terminal in the background.

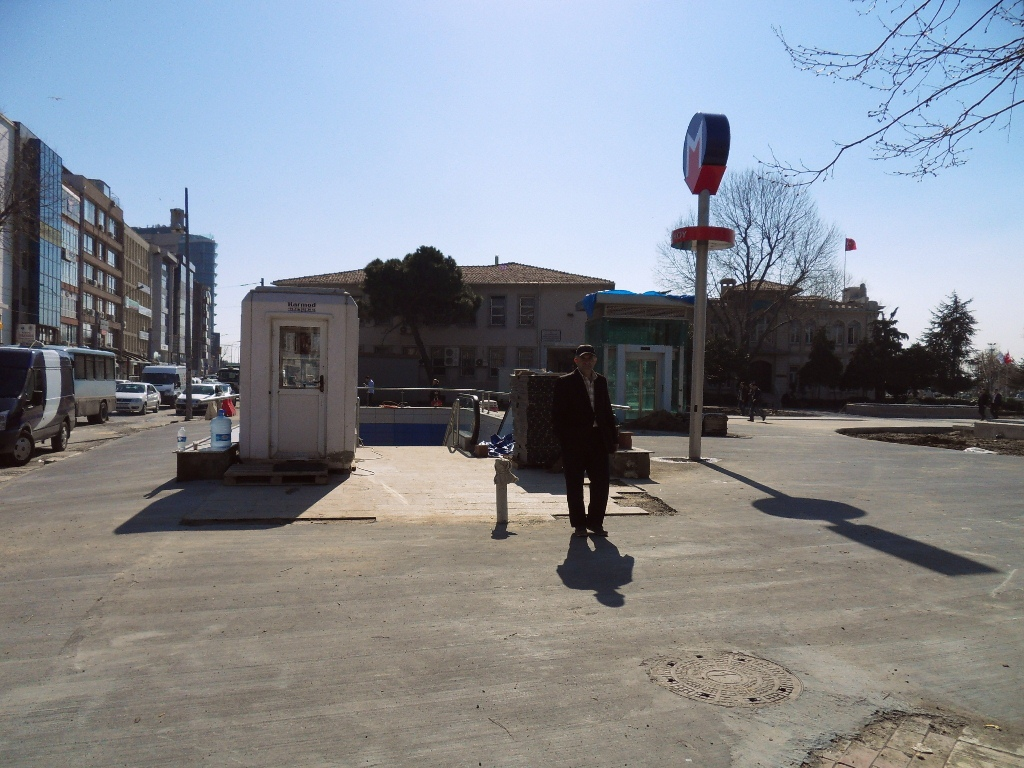
A different view to the station entrance.

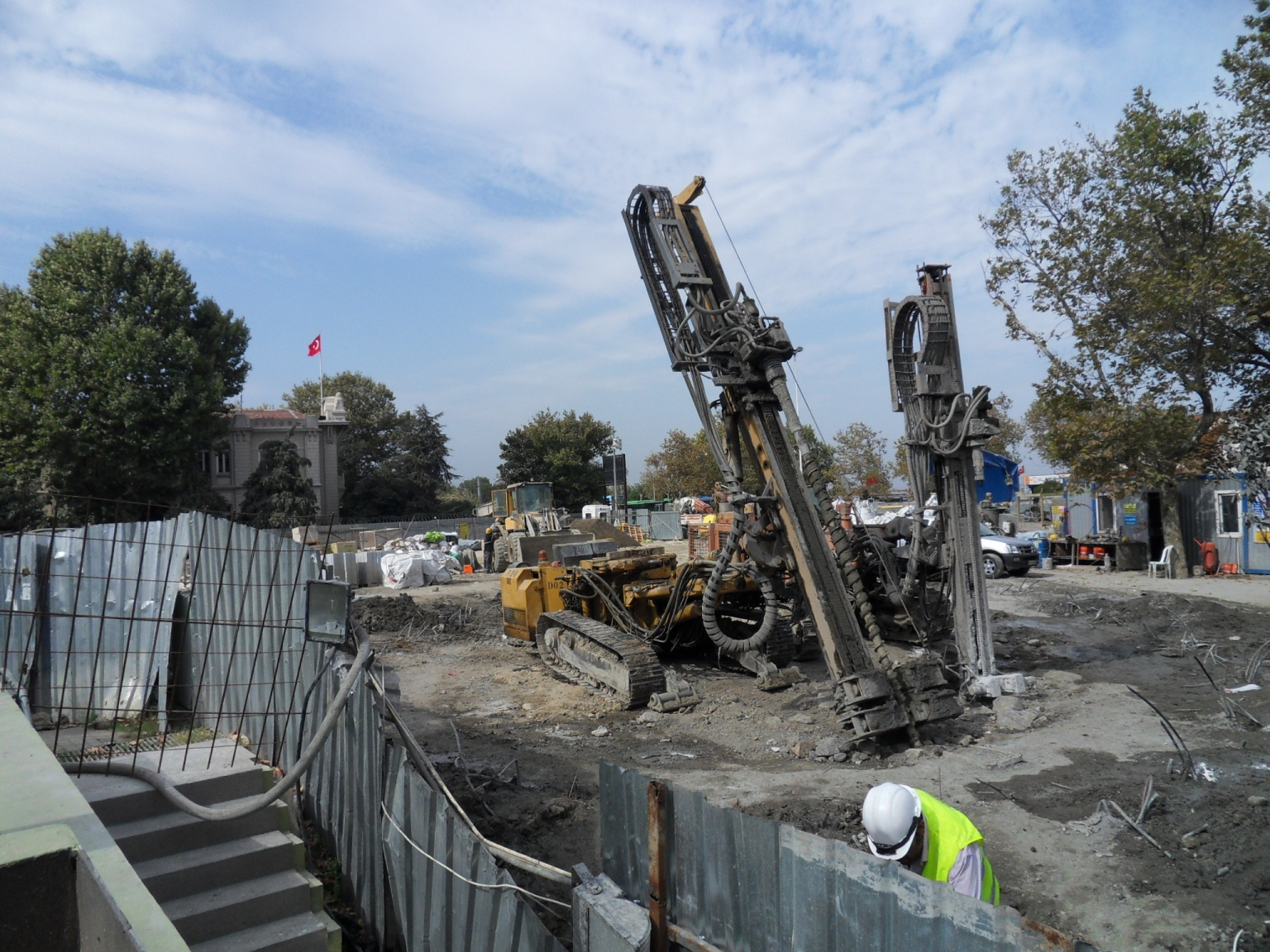
Kadıköy station during its construction.
