= Sabiha Gökçen Havalimanı station =

Station of the Istanbul Metro

Sabiha Gökçen Hvl. (Sabiha Gökçen Airport)
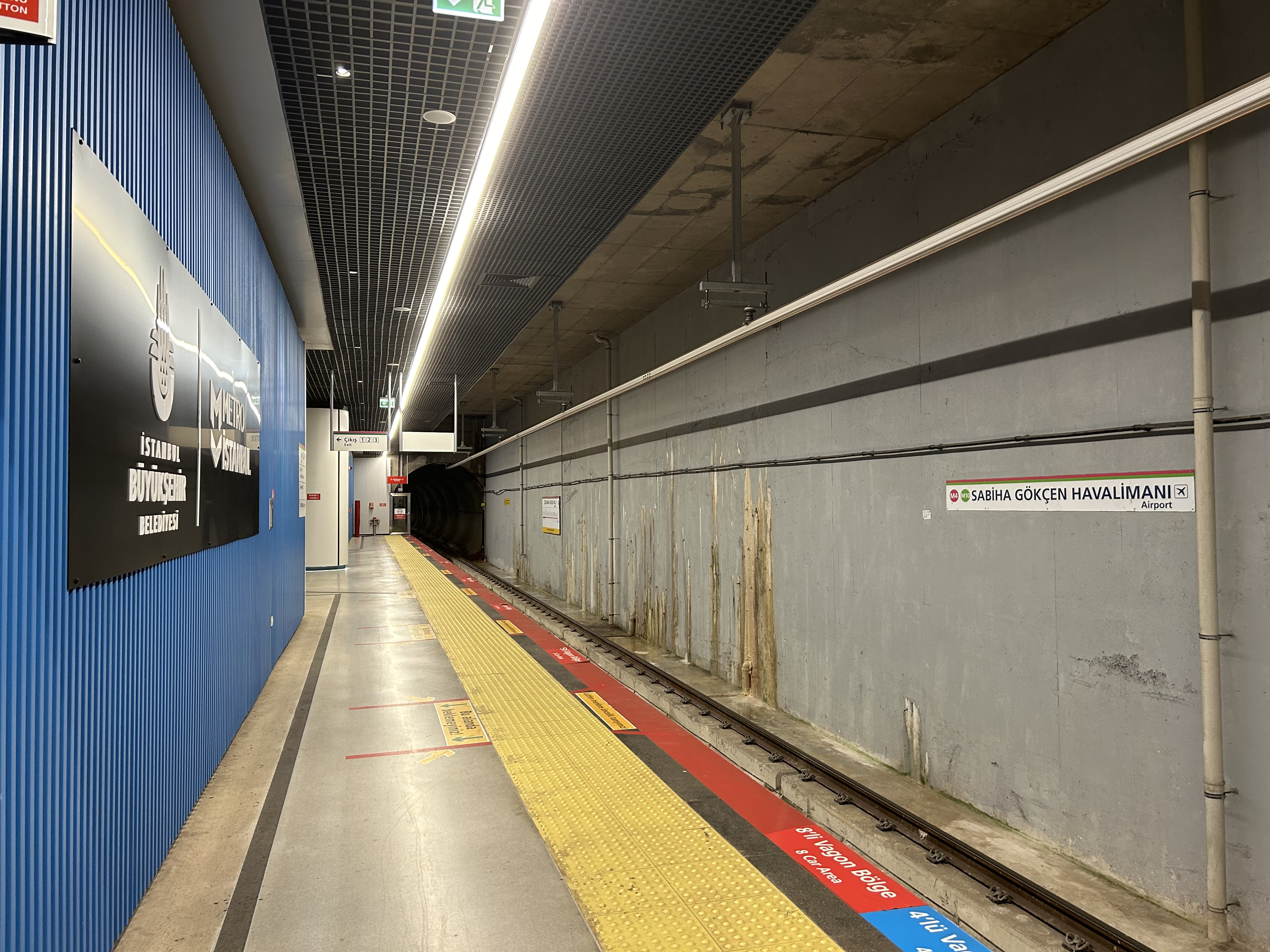
- Platform

General information
- Location: Sanayi Neighborhood, Sabiha Gökçen International Airport, 34906; Pendik, Istanbul; Turkey
- Coordinates: 40°54′23″N 29°18′41″E
- System: Istanbul Metro rapid transit station
- Owner: Istanbul Metropolitan Municipality
- Line: M4
- Platforms: 1 Island platform
- Tracks: 2
- Connections: İETT Bus: E-3, E-9, E-10, E-11, 132H, SG-1, SG-2; Sabiha Gökçen International Airport

Construction
- Structure type: Underground
- Parking: Yes
- Cycle facilities: Yes
- Accessible: Yes

History
- Opened: 2 October 2022 (3 years ago)
- Electrified: 1,500 V DC Overhead line

Services
Preceding station	Istanbul Metro	Following station
Kurtköy towards Kadıköy	M4 Line	Terminus
Location

Sabiha Gökçen Havalimanı (Sabiha Gökçen Airport) is an underground rapid transit station on the M4 line of the Istanbul Metro. It is located in the Sanayi neighborhood of Pendik, serving Sabiha Gökçen International Airport. It was opened on 2 October 2022 with the extension of M4 line from Tavşantepe, and is the eastern terminus of the line.

== Future development ==
The line is expected to extend to Kurtköy YHT/ViaPort, and this is likely to occur after 2030.

== Layout ==
Westbound	← toward Kadıköy (Kurtköy)
Island platform, doors will open on the left or right
Westbound	← toward Kadıköy (Kurtköy)

== Operation information ==
The M4 line operates between 06:00 and 00:00 with a train frequency of 4 minutes at peak hours and 7 minutes at all other times. The line also operates night metro services between 00:00 and 06:00 on Saturdays and Sundays, with trains running every 30 minutes. This provides 66 hours of uninterrupted service between Friday and Sunday. During these hours, fares are charged at double the price. During this time, Entrances 2 and 3 are open, whilst Entrance 1 is closed.

== Gallery ==
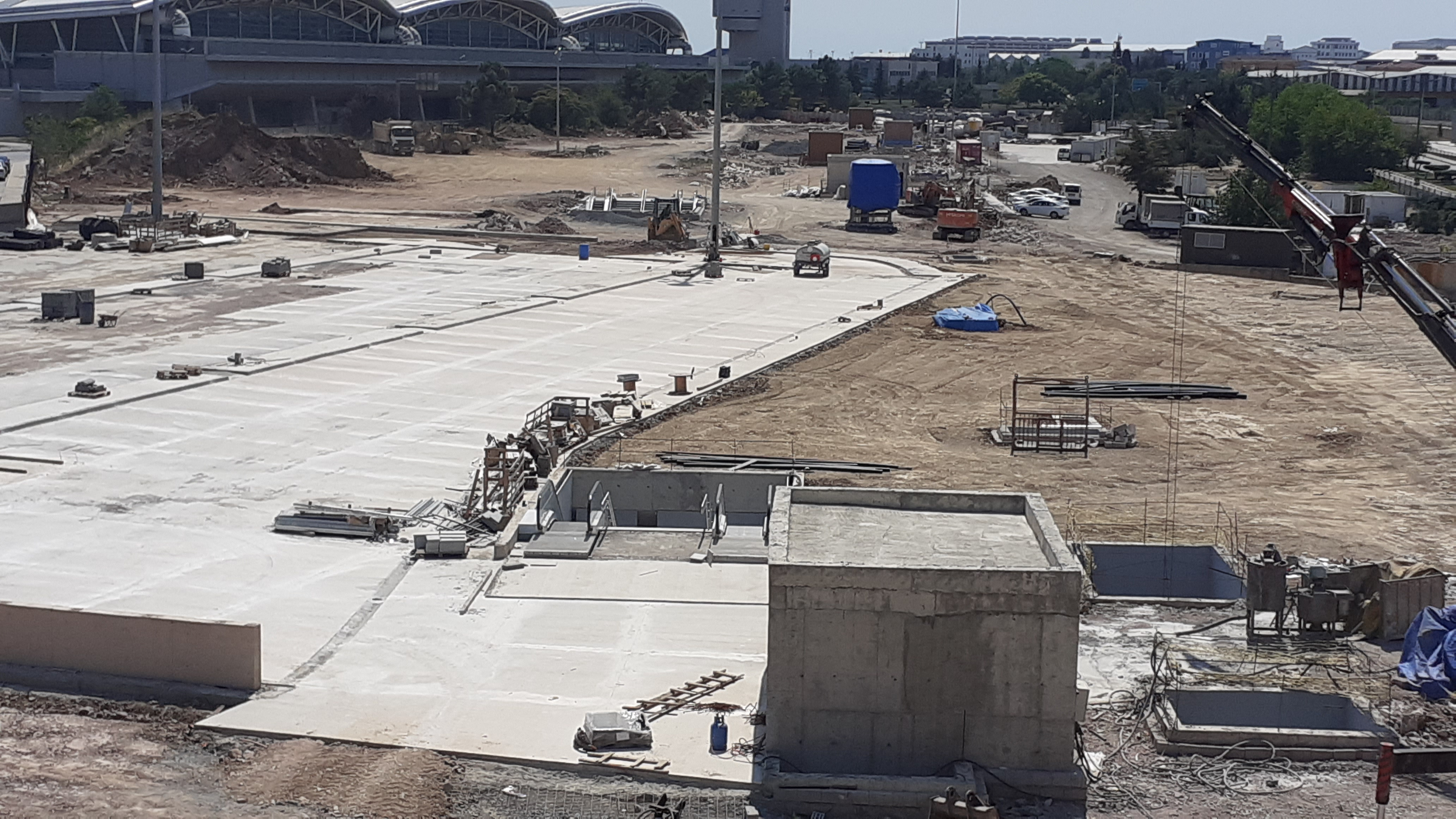
Under construction (July 2022)

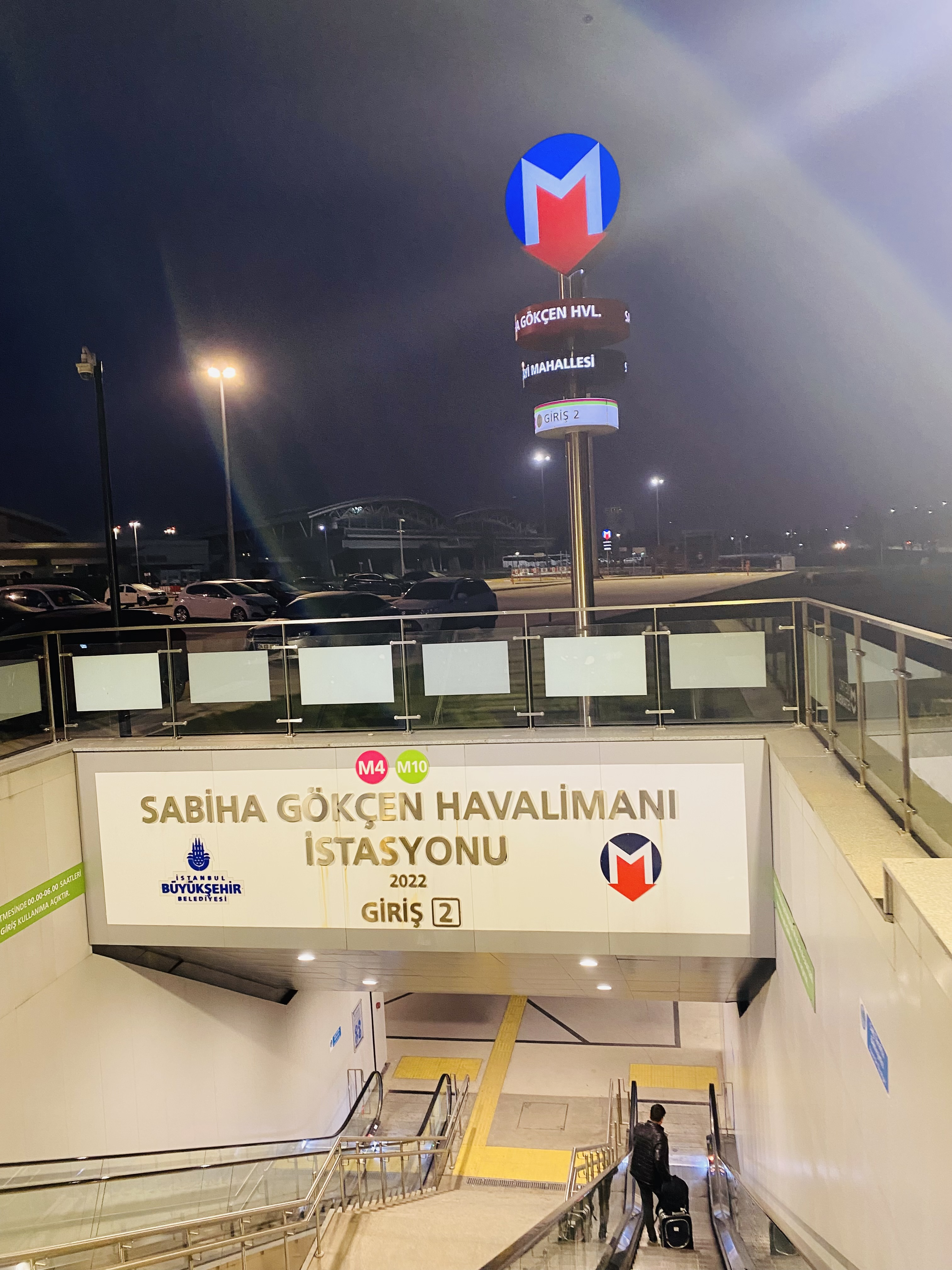
Entrance

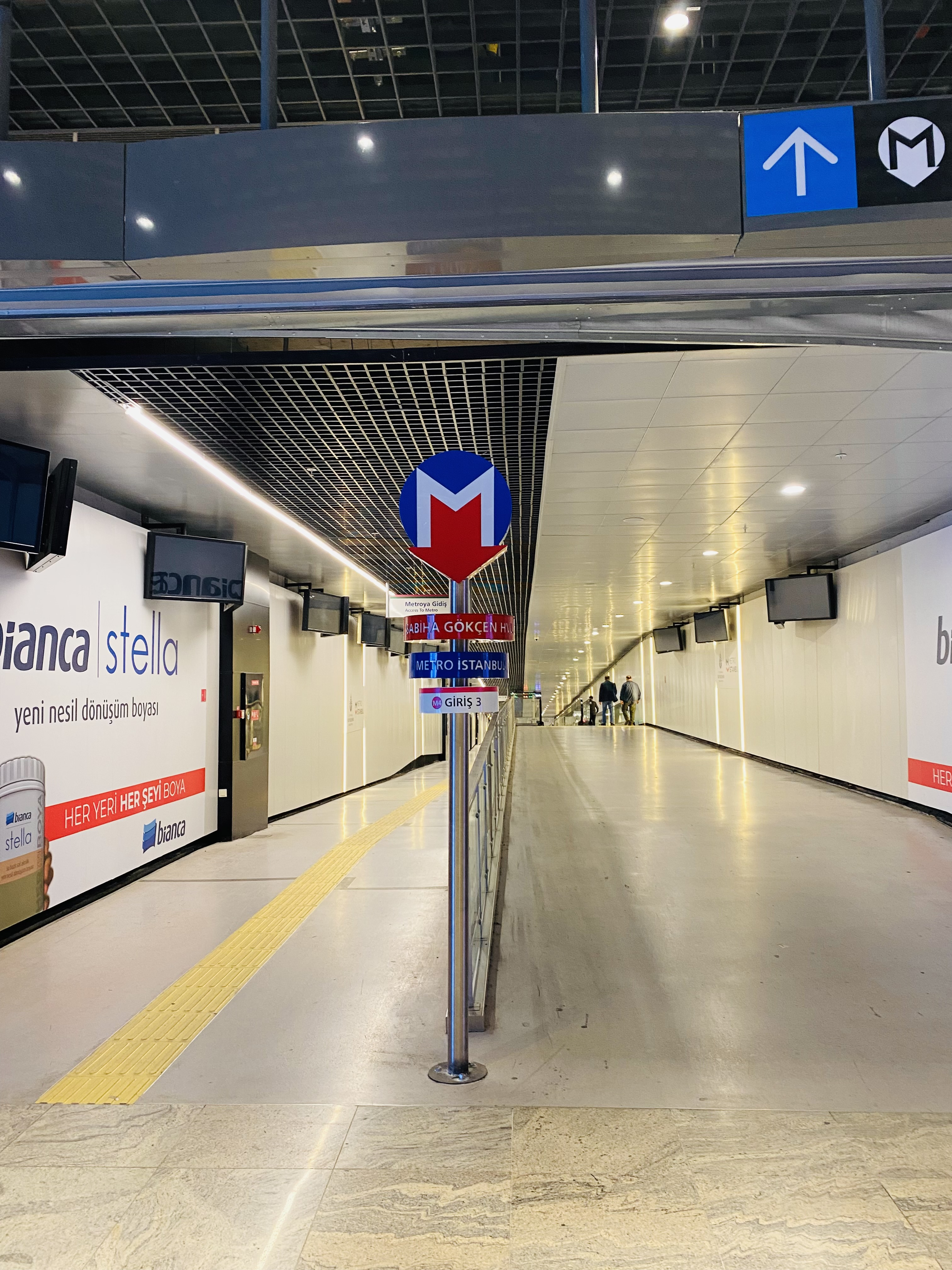
Entrance from inside the airport

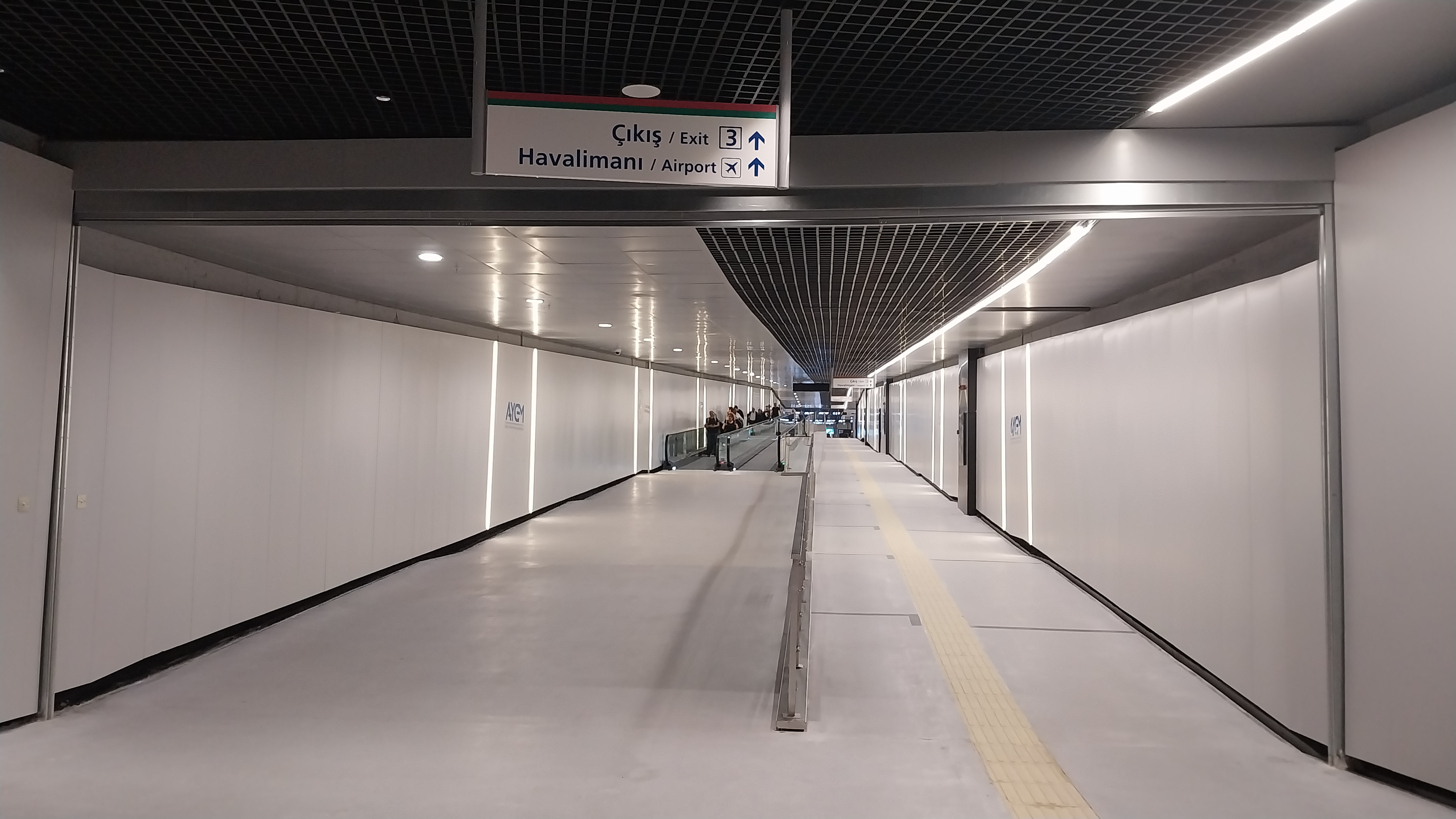
Pedestrian underpass (Exit 3)

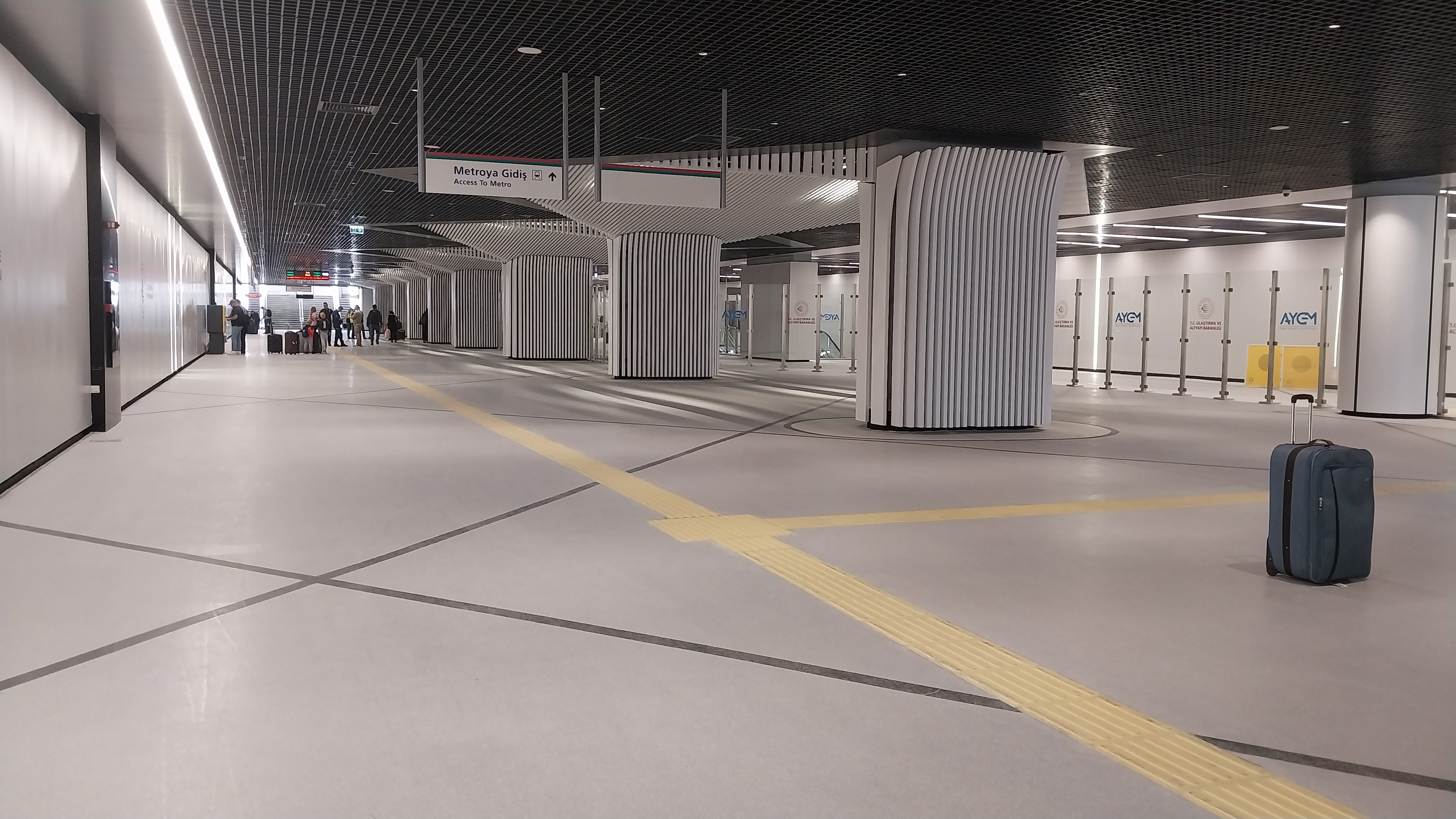
Ticket hall

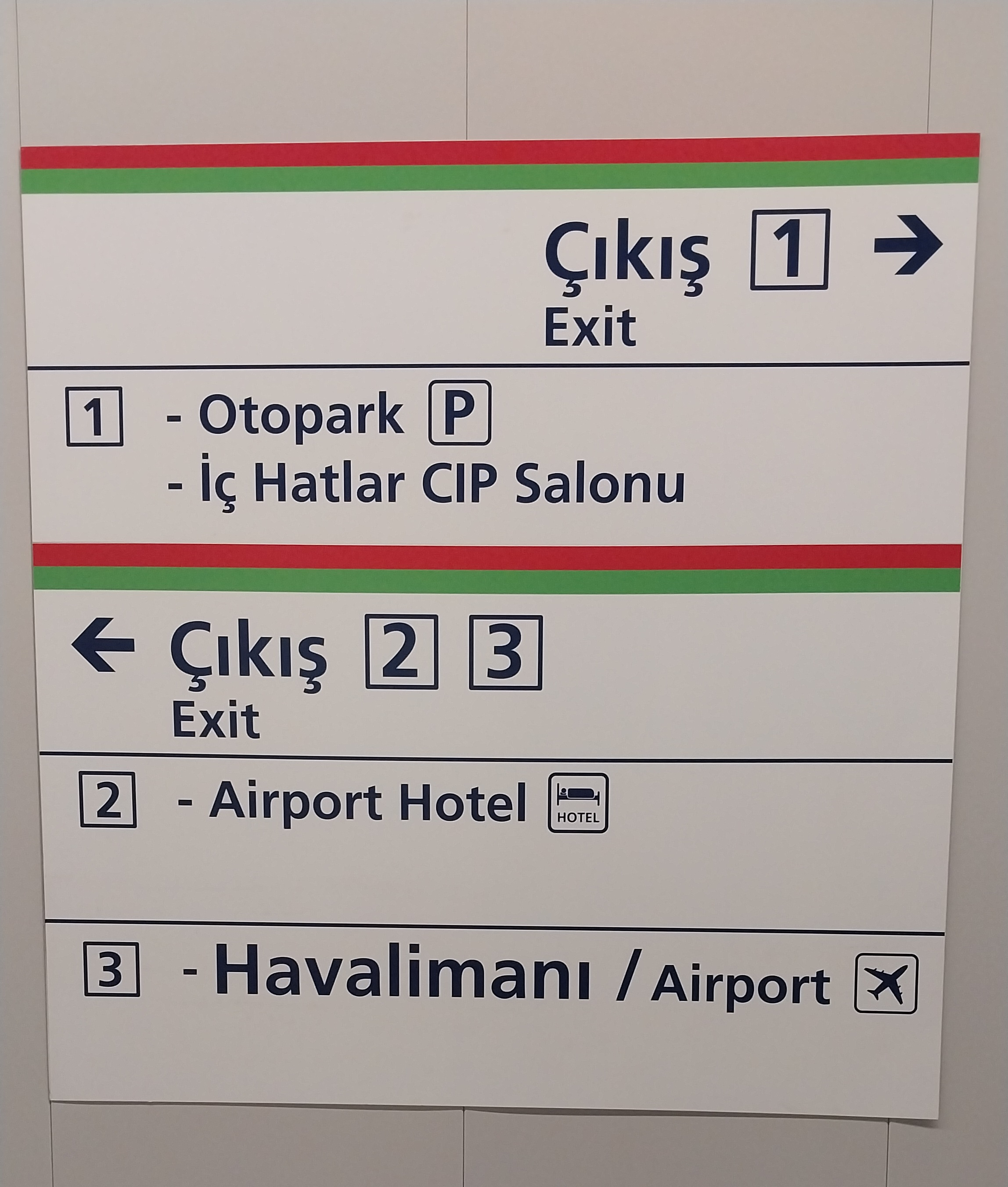
Exit sign

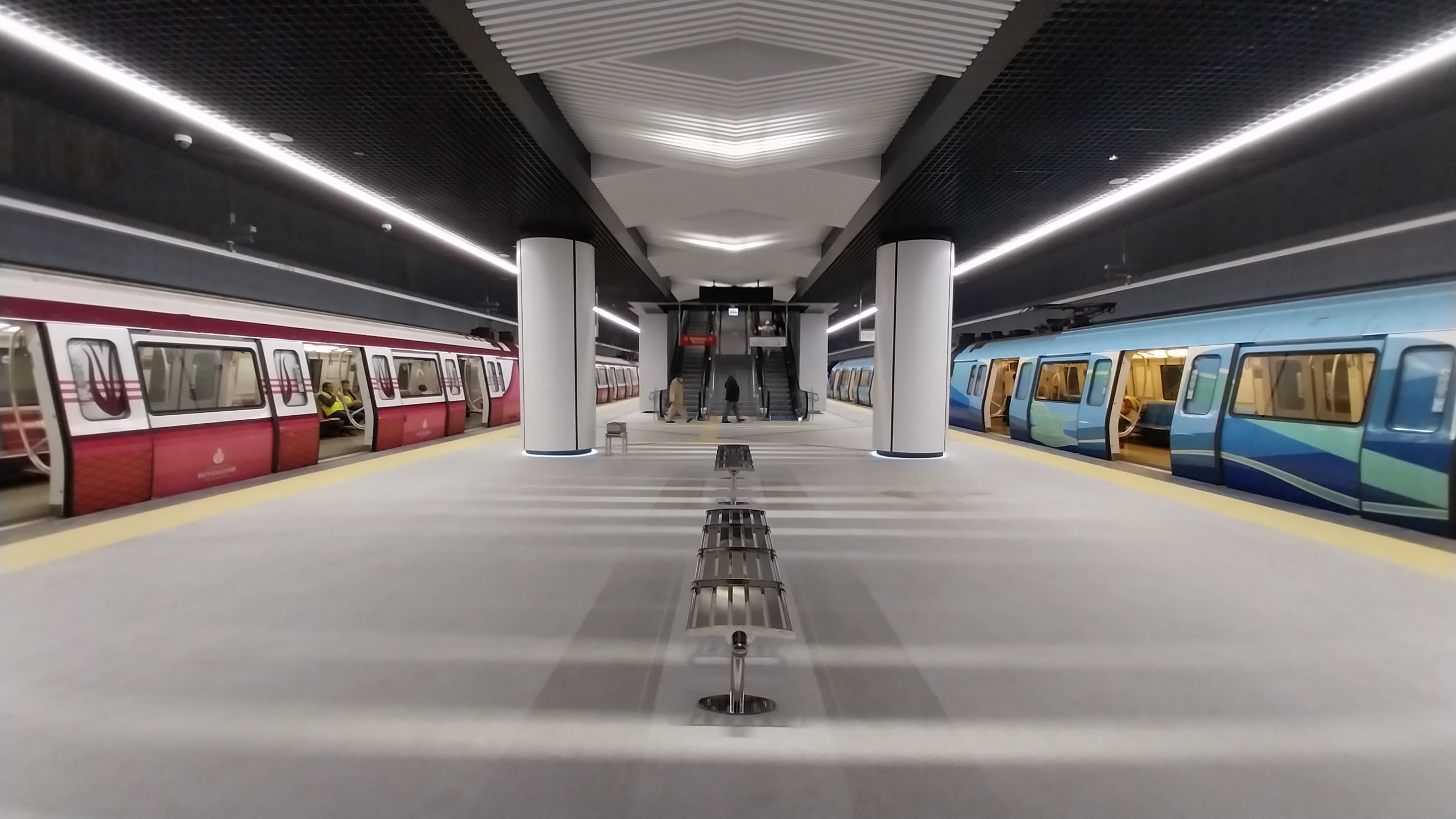
Platform view 1

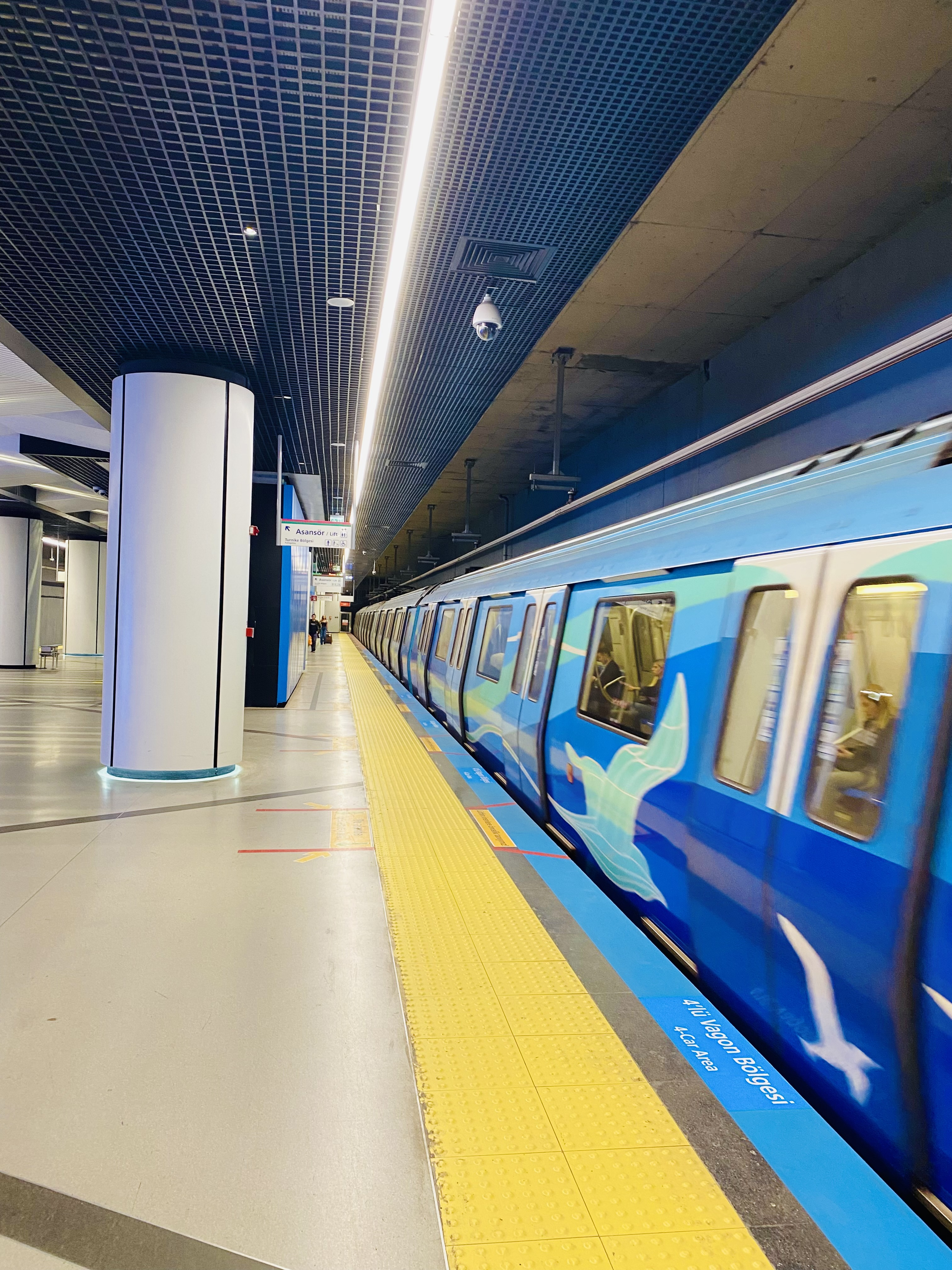
Platform view 2

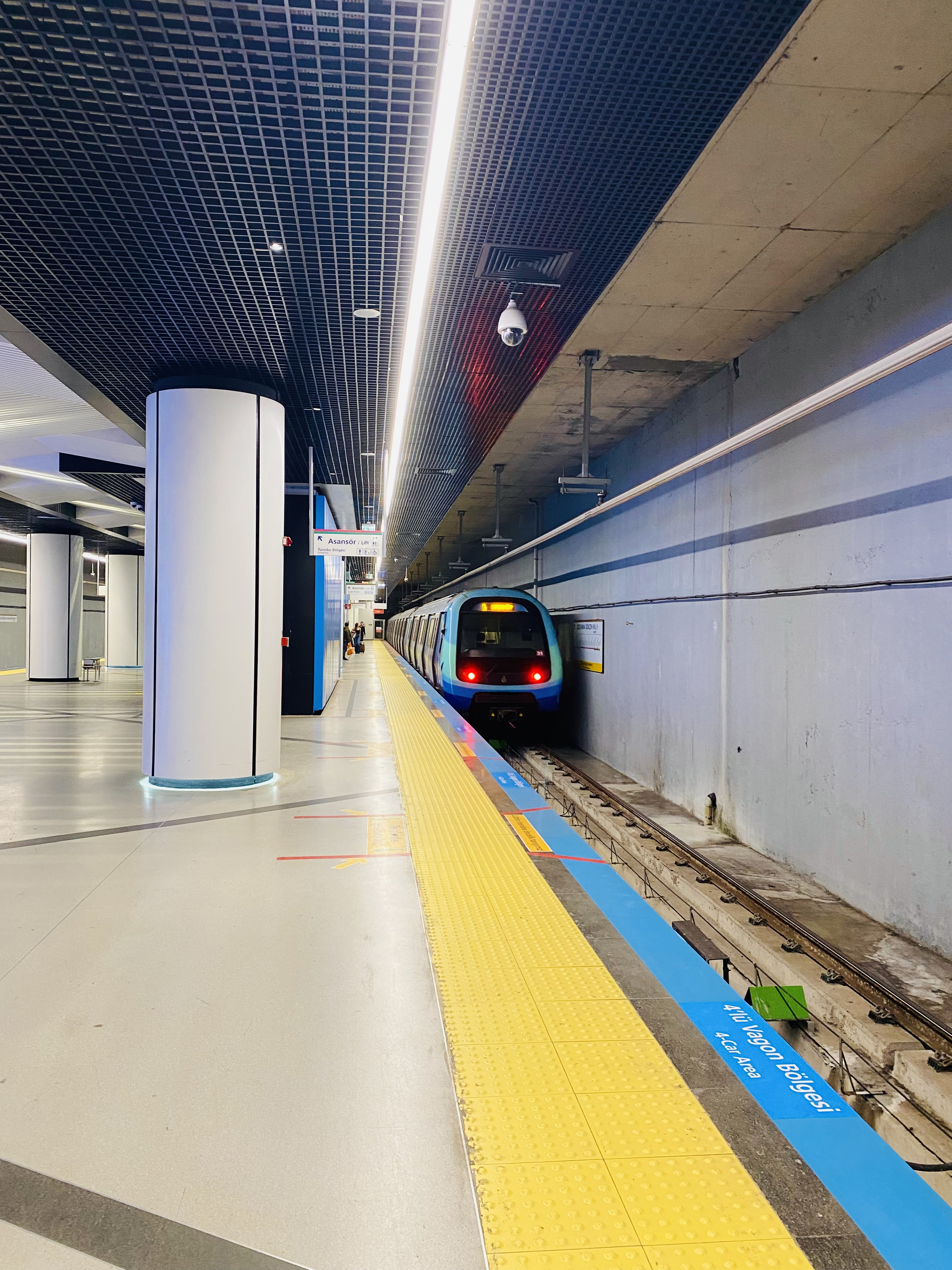
Platform view 3

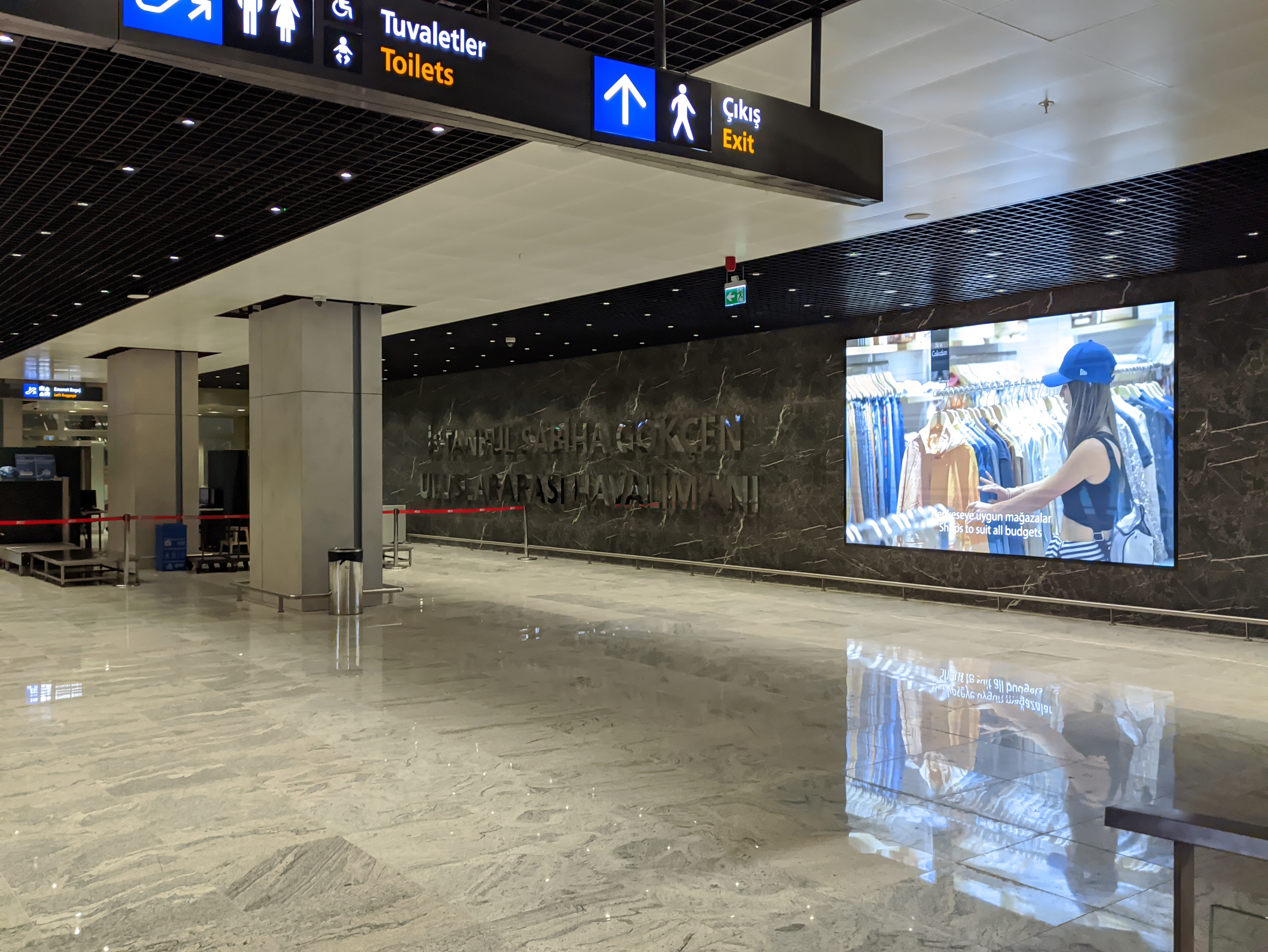
Airport entrance

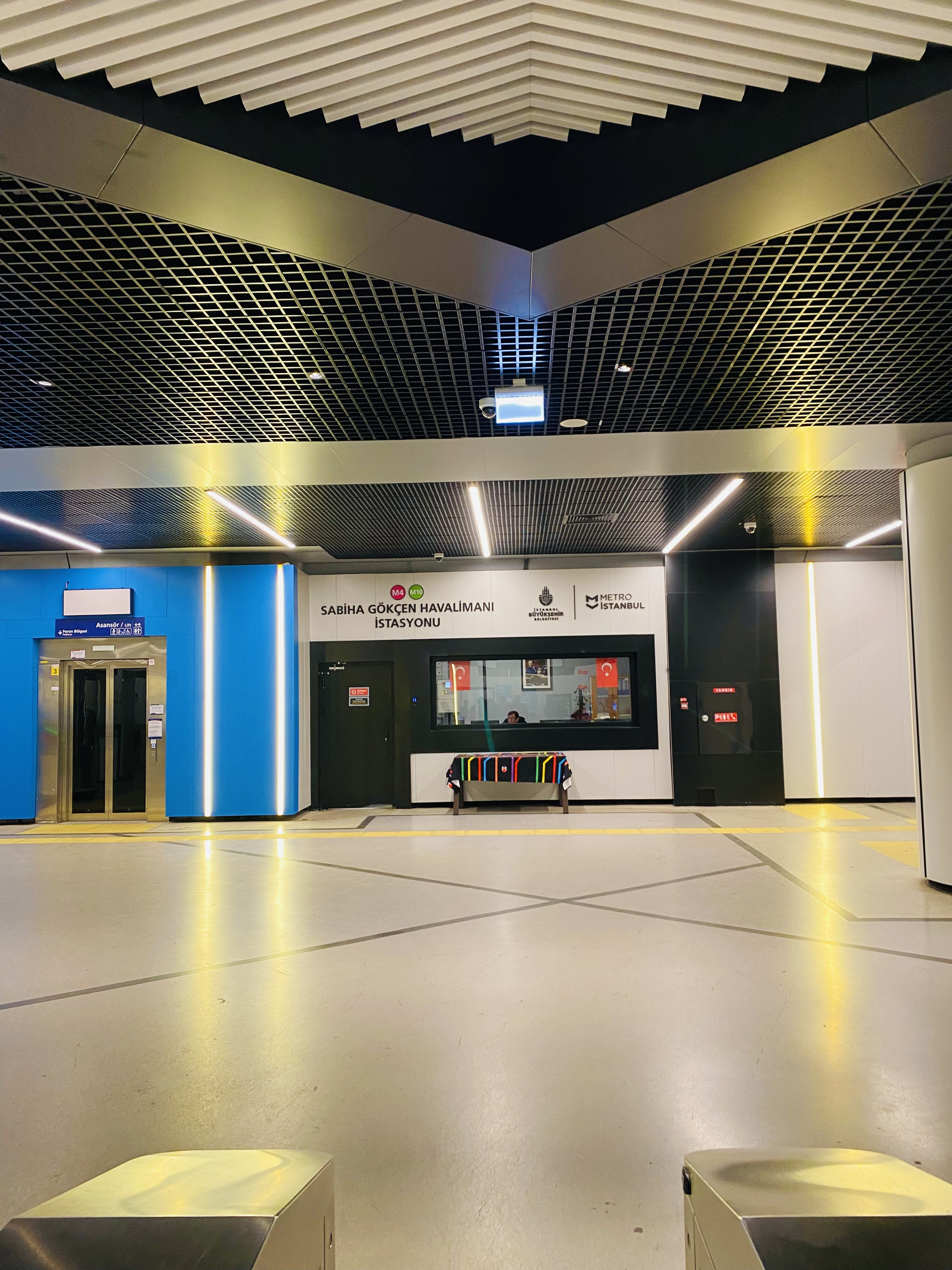
Station entrance from arrivals hall

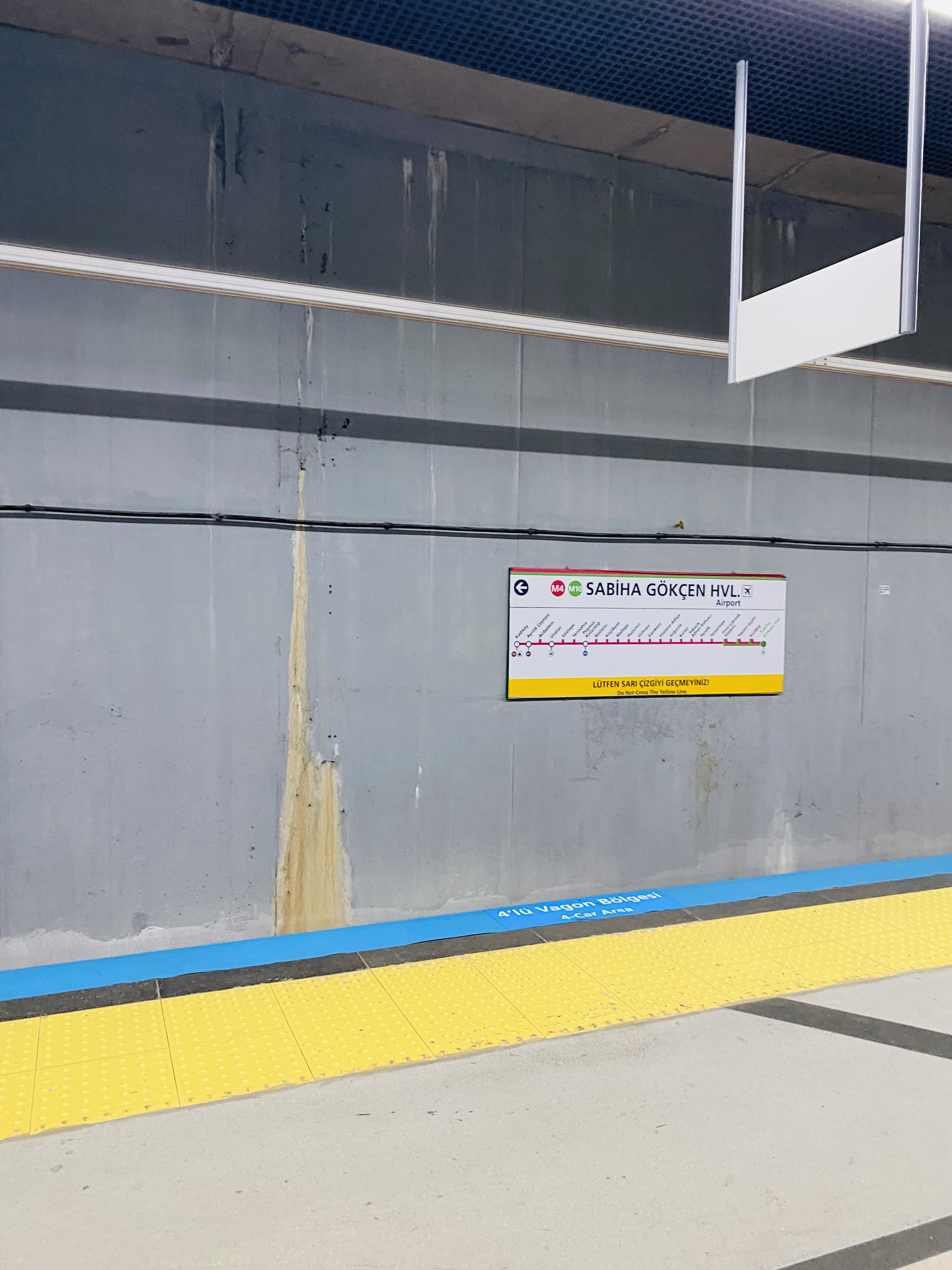
Route diagram on the platform wall
