= Kartal (disambiguation) =

Kartal is a district of Istanbul, Turkey.

Kartal may also refer to:

== Places ==
=== Turkey ===
- Kartal (Istanbul Metro), an underground railway station on the M4 line
- Kartal railway station, a surface railway station on the Marmaray line in Istanbul
- Kartal Anadolu Lisesi, an Anatolian High School in Istanbul
- Kartal Cemevi, a cemevi of Alevi Moslems in Istanbul
- Kartal Park, Istanbul, an urban public park

=== Other countries ===
- Kartal, Hungary, a village in Pest County
- Kartal Lake, a lake in Ukraine; see List of Ramsar sites in Ukraine

== People ==
- Kartal (name)

== Other uses ==
- Kartal S.K., a sports club in Istanbul
- Kartal-class fast attack craft, a class of missile and torpedo boats of the Turkish Navy
- Tofaş Kartal, a car model

== See also ==
- Khartal, an Indian musical instrument
