= Yakacık =

Yakacık is a Turkish place name, and it may refer to:

- Yakacık, Çivril
- Yakacık, Ergani
- Yakacık, Hatay, commonly referred to as Payas, a city in Payas district of Hatay Province.
- Yakacık, Beşiri, a village in Beşiri district of Batman Province
- Yakacık, Gazipaşa, a village in Gazipaşa district of Antalya Province
- Yakacık Çarşı, a neighborhood of Kartal district in Istanbul Province
- Yakacık Yeni, a neighborhood of Kartal district in Istanbul Province
- Yakacık, Merzifon, a village in Merzifon district of Amasya Province
- Yakacık, Söğüt, a village in Söğüt district of Bilecik Province
