= Soğanlık station =

Station of the Istanbul Metro

Soğanlık
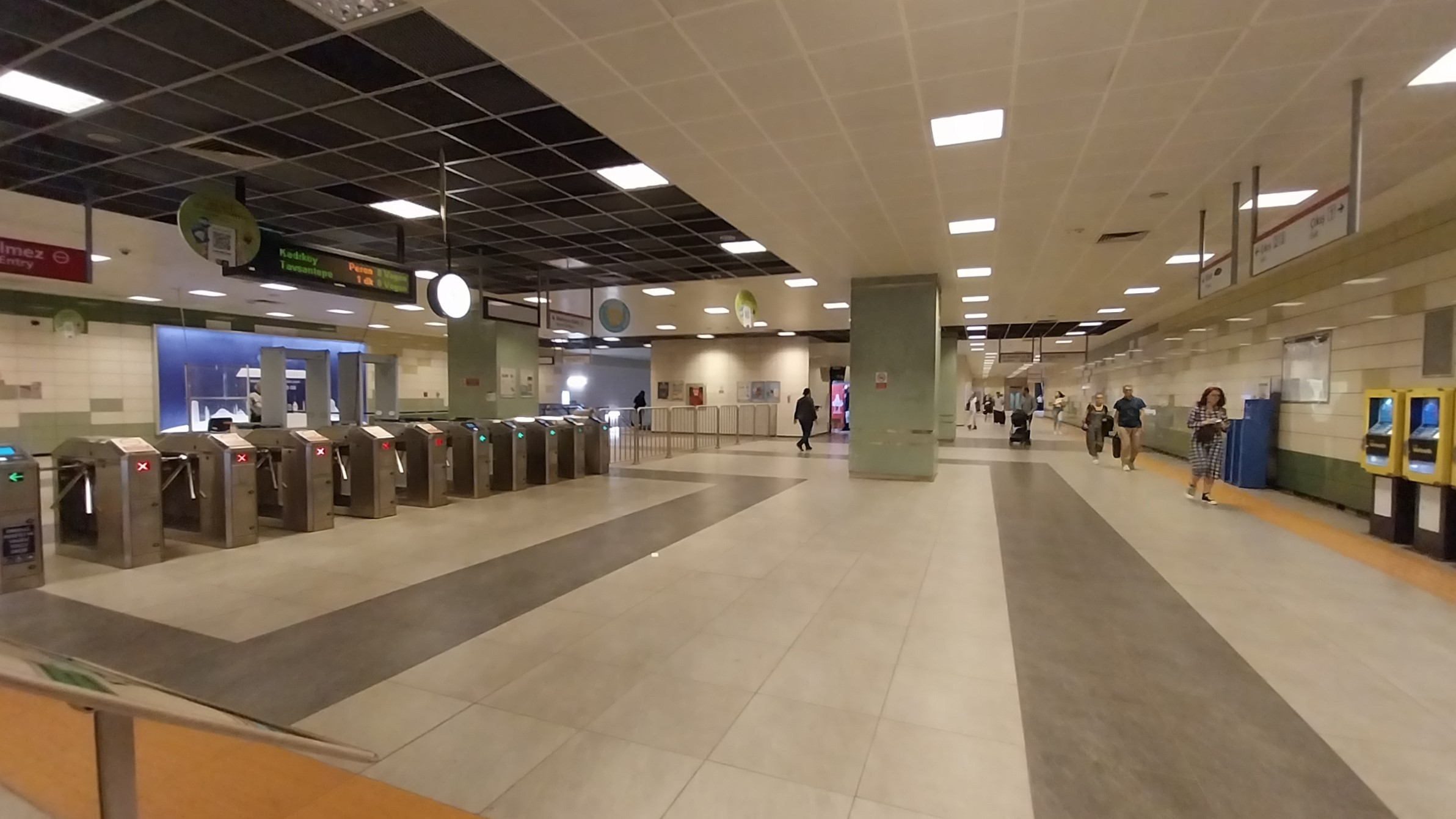

General information
- Location: D.100, Soğanlık Yeni Mah., 34880; Kartal, Istanbul
- Coordinates: 40.9127°N 29.1920°E
- System: Istanbul Metro rapid transit station
- Owner: Istanbul Metropolitan Municipality
- Operator: Metro Istanbul
- Line: M4
- Platforms: 1 island platform
- Tracks: 2
- Connections: İETT Bus: 16C, 16KH, 16S, 16Z, 17K, 17P, 21K, 130, 130A, 130E, 130Ş, 132G, 132M, 134GK, 251, 500T, E-10, KM11, KM12, KM21, KM23, KM25, KM29, KM32, KM60, KM70, KM71; Istanbul Minibus: Harem-Gebze, Kadıköy-Uğur Mumcu

Construction
- Structure type: Underground
- Parking: Yes (İşpark)
- Accessible: Yes

History
- Opened: 17 August 2012
- Electrified: 1,500 V DC Overhead line

Services
Preceding station	Istanbul Metro	Following station
Hastane–Adliye towards Kadıköy	M4 Line	Kartal towards Sabiha Gökçen Airport
Location

Soğanlık is an underground station on the M4 line of the Istanbul Metro in Kartal. It is located beneath the D.100 State Highway in the Soğanlık Yeni neighborhood. Connection to IETT city buses and Istanbul Minibus service is available. The station consists of an island platform with two tracks and was opened on 17 August 2012.

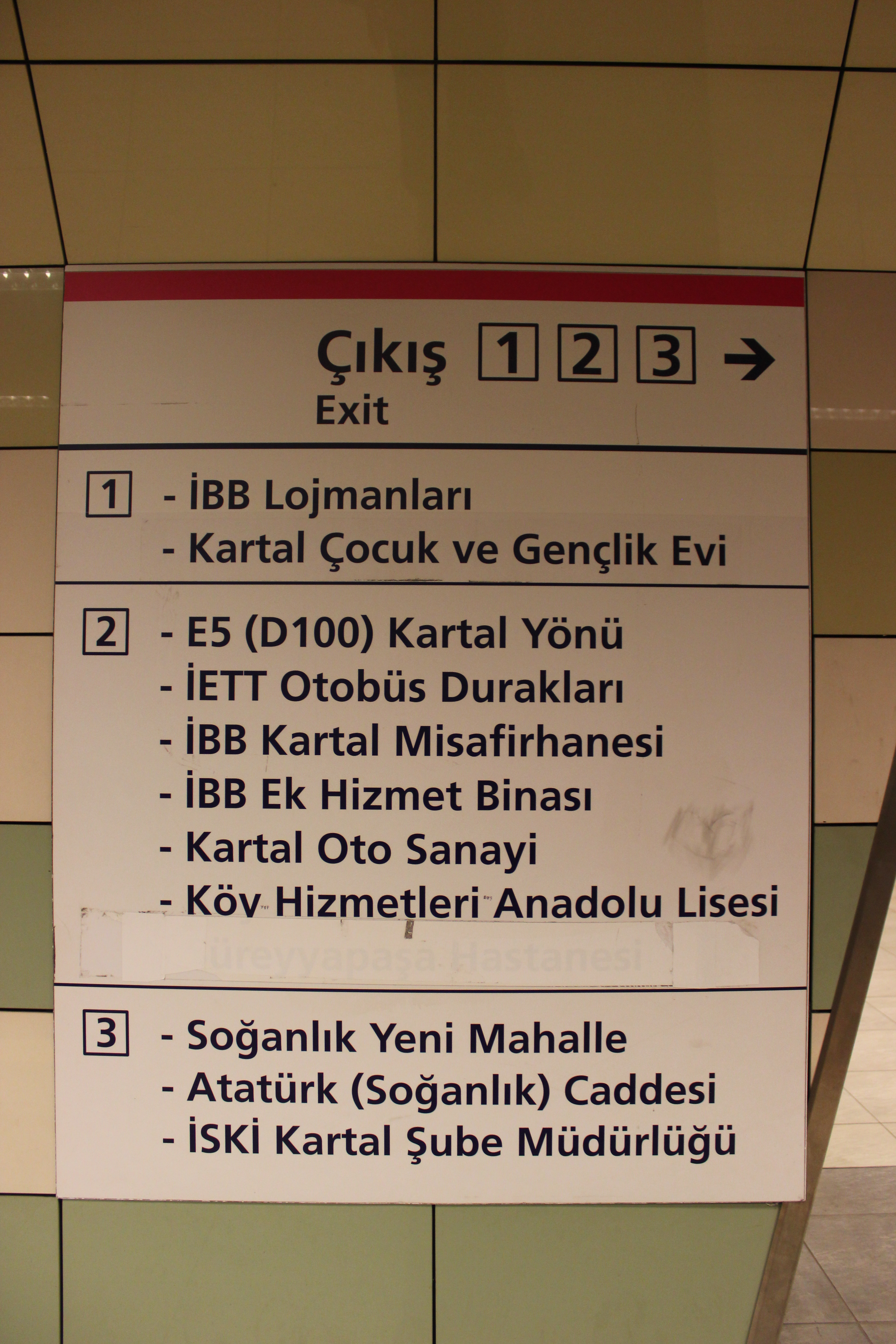
Soğanlık (Istanbul Metro)
