= Kosilaos =

Town of ancient Bithynia

Coordinates: 40°52′26″N 29°14′37″E

Kosilaos was a town of ancient Bithynia located on the road from Libyssa to Chalcedon on the north coast of the Sinus Astacenus, an arm of the Propontis.

Its site is located east of Pendik, in Asiatic Turkey.
