= Kurtköy, Pendik =

Kurtköy
- Neighbourhood
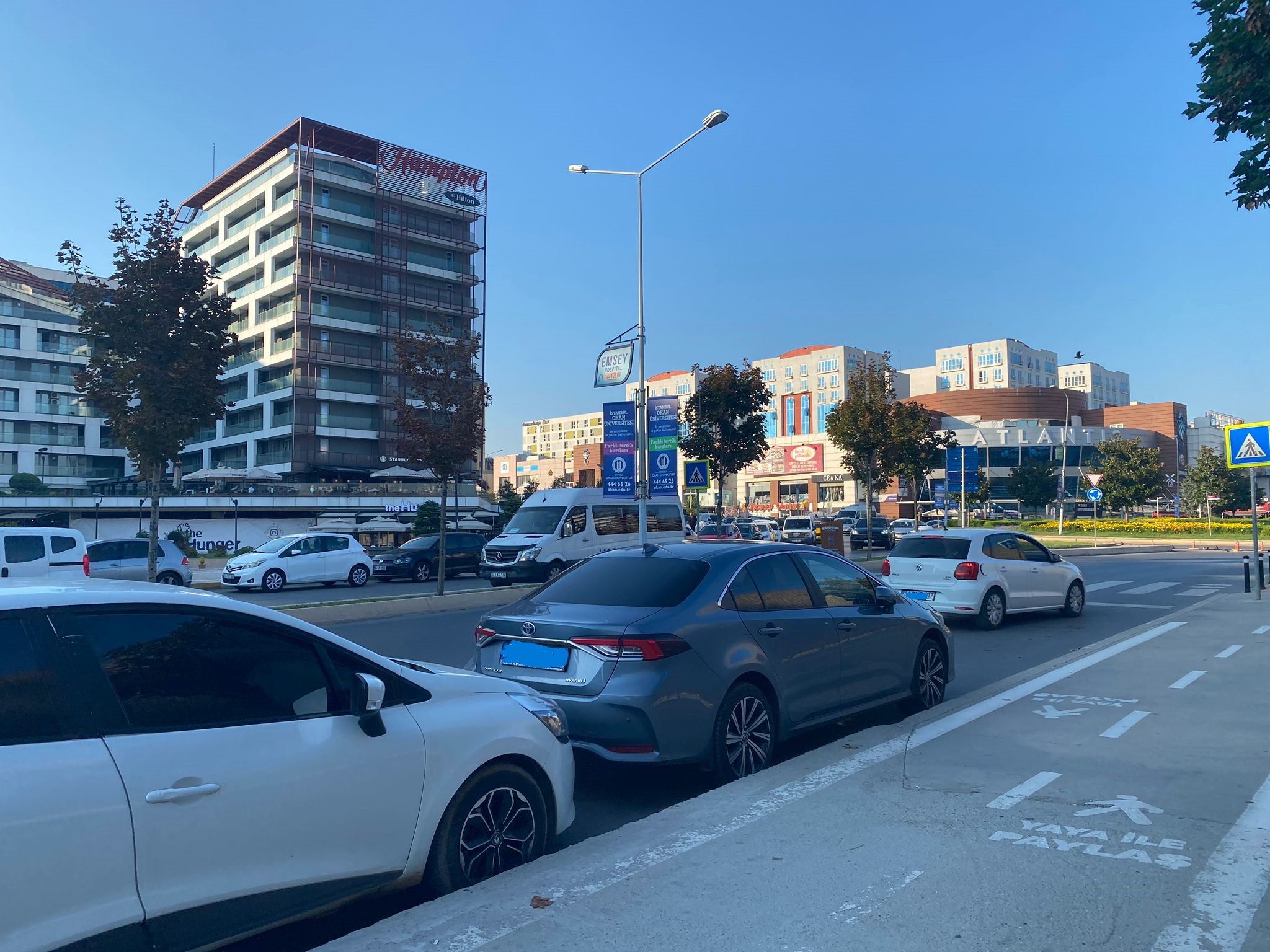
- Kurtköy Millet Street

- Location within Turkey Location within Istanbul
- Coordinates: 40°54′51″N 29°17′57″E
- Country: Turkey
- Province: Istanbul
- District: Pendik
- Population (2022): 37,801
- Time zone: UTC+3 (TRT)
- Postal code: 34912
- Area code: 0216

Kurtköy is a neighbourhood in the municipality and district of Pendik, Istanbul Province, Turkey. Its population is 37,801 (2022).

Before 1987, when the district of Pendik was established, it was a neighbourhood of Kartal. It lies southeast of Aydos Hill and north of Istanbul Sabiha Gökçen International Airport. "Kurtköy" may also refer to a larger area, which includes the neighbourhoods of Kurtköy, Yenişehir, Çamlık, Sanayi, Şeyhli, Sülüntepe, Harmandere, Kurna, Emirli, Ballıca, Kurtdoğmuş, Göçbeyli, Akfırat and Tepeören.

== History of Kurtköy ==
Kurtköy was founded in the 1300s by an Ottoman commander named Hasan, who was of Yörük origin, and later some Yörük Turks were settled here by the Ottoman Sultan Mehmed II.

== Kurtköy in Sports ==
Kurtköy has a sports team that plays in Turkey. The name of the team is Kurtköyspor. He became the champion in the 2021-22 U-16 League in football in Turkey and the team was founded in 1992.

== Schools ==
- Kurtköy High School
