= Aydos Hill =

Hill in Istanbul, Turkey

- Aydos Tepesi
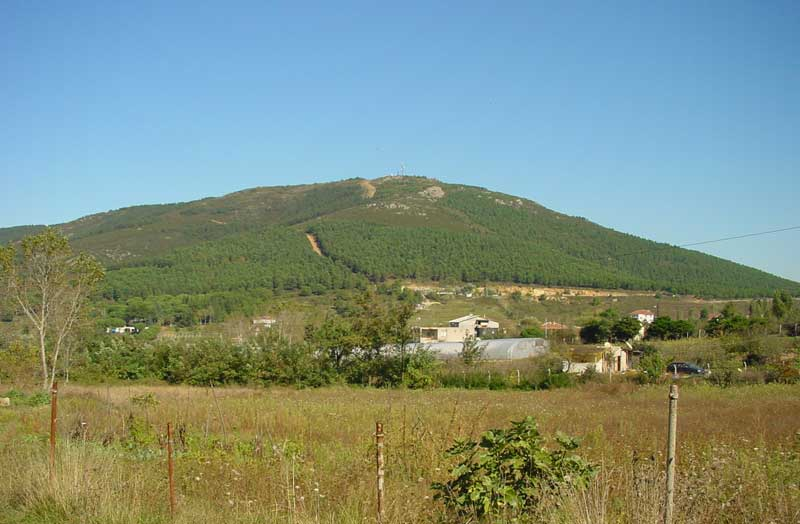
- A view of Aydos Hill.

Highest point
- Elevation: 537 m (1,762 ft)
- Coordinates: 40°55′54″N 29°15′17″E

Geography
- Location: Kartal, Istanbul

Aydos Hill (Turkish: Aydos Tepesi) is a hill in the north of Kartal district of Istanbul, Turkey. Its peak at 537 m (1,762 ft) above sea level is the highest point of Istanbul. The hill is surrounded by woods.

== Toponymy of Aydos ==
Aydos' name comes from Aydos Fortress, which was situated next to the hill. The fortress was built in the first half of 6th century by the Roman Empire. Today, the ruins of Aydos Fortress are in the Sultanbeyli and Pendik district of Istanbul.
