= Nassete =

Ancient town of Bithynia

Coordinates: 40°55′07″N 29°07′55″E

Nassete was a coastal town of ancient Bithynia located on the road from Libyssa to Chalcedon on the north coast of the Propontis.

Its site is located near Maltepe in Asiatic Turkey.
