= Kartal metro station =

Station of the Istanbul Metro

Kartal
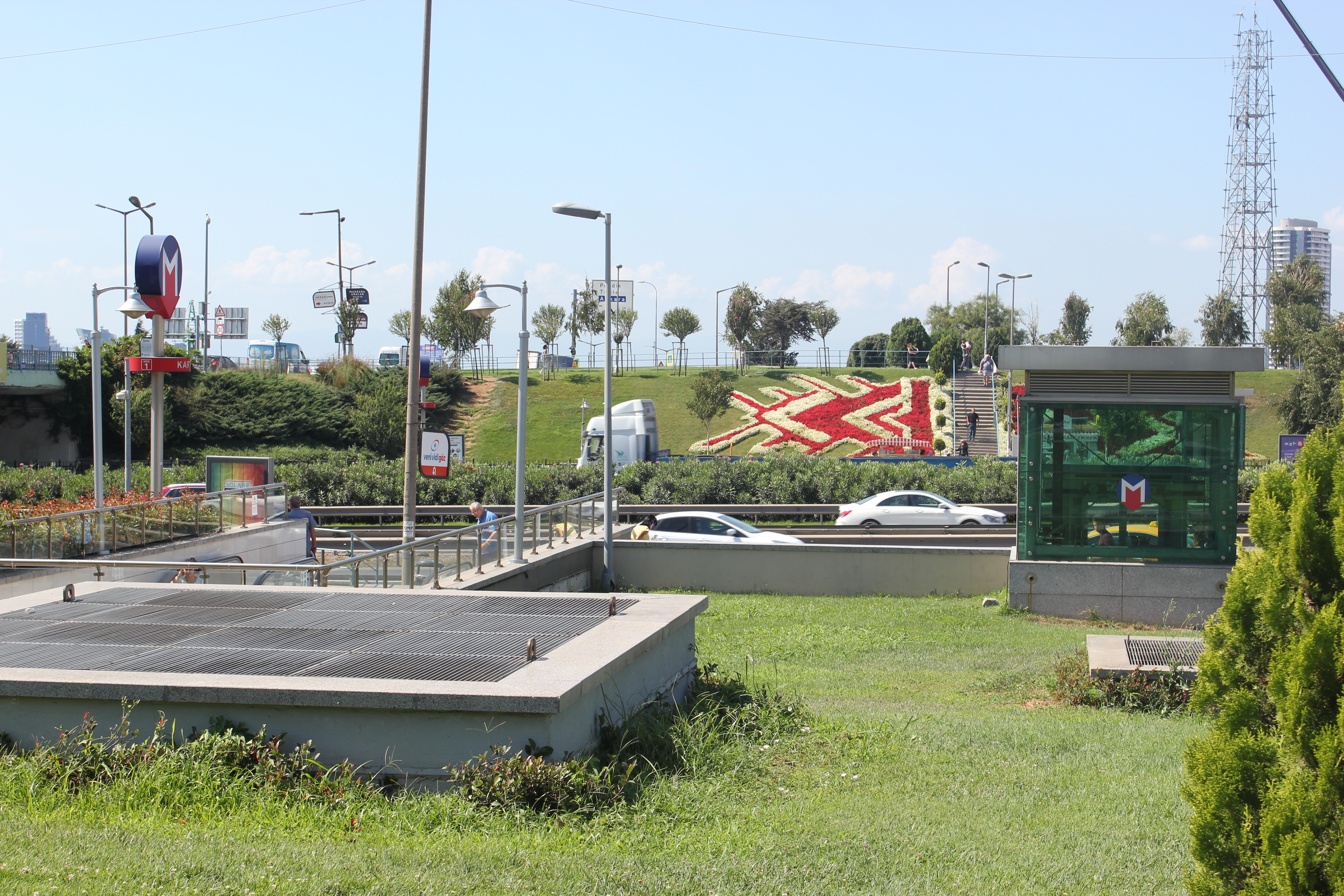

General information
- Location: Kartal Kav., Cumhuriyet Mah., 34880; Kartal, Istanbul
- Coordinates: 40.9061°N 29.2111°E
- System: Istanbul Metro rapid transit station
- Owner: Istanbul Metropolitan Municipality
- Operator: Metro Istanbul
- Line: M4
- Platforms: 1 island platform
- Tracks: 2
- Connections: İETT Bus: 16C, 16KH, 16S, 16Z, 17K, 17P, 21K, 130, 130A, 130E, 130Ş, 131K, 131V, 131Y, 132C, 132ÇK, 132G, 132M, 132N, 132S, 132T, 132Y, 132Z, 134, 134CK, 134GK, 134K, 134UK, 251, 500T, E-10, KM11, KM12, KM21, KM23, KM25, KM29, KM31, KM32, KM60, KM70, KM71; Istanbul Minibus: Harem-Gebze, Kadıköy-Uğur Mumcu

Construction
- Structure type: Underground
- Accessible: Yes

History
- Opened: 17 August 2012
- Electrified: 1,500 V DC Overhead line

Services
Preceding station	Istanbul Metro	Following station
Soğanlık towards Kadıköy	M4 Line	Yakacık–A. Kahveci towards Sabiha Gökçen Airport
Location

Kartal is an underground station on the M4 line of the Istanbul Metro in Kartal. It is located beneath the Kartal interchange, along the D.100 State Highway in the Cumhuriyet neighborhood. Kartal was the eastern terminus of the M4 from its opening in 2012 to 2016, when the line was extended further to Pendik. Connection to IETT city buses and Istanbul Minibus service is available. The station consists of an island platform with two tracks and was opened on 17 August 2012.

== Station Layout ==
P Platform level	Westbound	← toward Kadıköy
P Platform level	Island platform, doors will open on the left
P Platform level	Eastbound	toward Sabiha Gökçen Airport →
