= Pantichium =

Coastal town of ancient Bithynia

Coordinates: 40°52′36″N 29°14′06″E

Pantichium or Pantichion (Ancient Greek: Παντίχιον), also Panteichium or Panteichion (Παντείχιον), was a coastal town of ancient Bithynia located on the road from Libyssa to Chalcedon, southeast of the latter, on the north coast of the Propontis.

Its site is located at Pendik in Asiatic Turkey.
