= Sapanbağları =

Neighborhood in Pendik, Istanbul, Turkey

Sapanbağları (also spelled Sapan Bağları or Sabanbağları) is a neighborhood in Pendik, Istanbul, Turkey.

Its population is 12,347 (2020), and its surface area is 49.7 hectares. The neighborhood is home to many Bosnian immigrants.

Sapanbağları is bordered on the north by the Kartal neighborhood of Yalı, on the east by the Pendik neighborhood of Yeni, on the south by the Pendik neighborhood of Batı, and on the east by the Kartal neighborhood of Yunus.

== Name ==
Sapanbağları means literally "slingshot vineyards" (Turkish: sapan + bağ + -lar).

== History ==
From 1951 to 1971, Bosnians from the Sancak region migrated to Pendik and settled in the area that is now the Sapanbağları, Yeni, and Yeşilbağlar neighborhoods, which had been covered in vineyards (bağlar). The Sabanbağları Mosque was built in 1955. The opening of the Pendik Shipyard in 1982 increased the population of the area. Sapanbağları was established as an official neighborhood in 1996 by separation from the Batı neighborhood of Pendik.

The Pendik Sapanbağları Hunting and Shooting Club Association was established in 1970, while the Bosniak Social Assistance and Culture Association was established in the present Sapanbağları neighborhood in 1992.
