= Kartal Surp Nişan Armenian Orthodox Church =

Surp Nişan Kilisesi
- Kartal Surp Nişan Ermeni Kilisesi
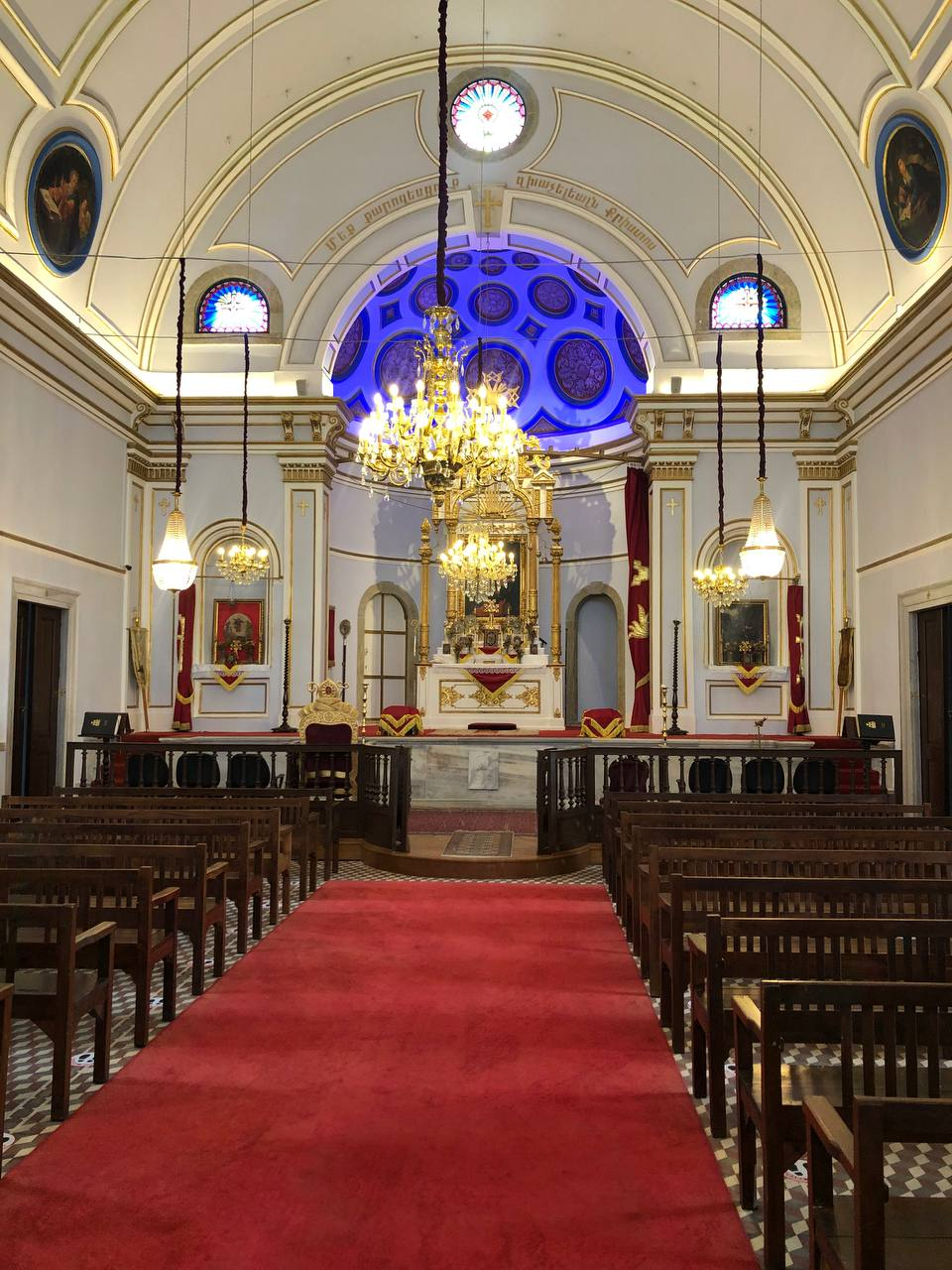
- Surp Nişan Kilisesi
- Surp Nişan Kilisesi
- 40.89004°N 29.187611°E
- Location: Kartal, Istanbul, Kartal
- Country: Turkey
- Denomination: Armenian Apostolic Church

Architecture
- Groundbreaking: 1776
- Completed: 1776

Kartal Surp Nişan Armenian Church (Holy Cross Armenian Church) is an Armenian Church located in Kartal Municipality, Istanbul. The facility was built in the 16th century as a chapel. It collapsed and was rebuilt as a school and church in 1776.

Since 1857, the church was renewed. It has been in service since 1 September 1857.

The church is a property of Kartal Surp Nişan Armenian Church and School Foundation.
