= 2004 Istanbul restaurant attack =

2004 terrorist attack

2004 attack on Istanbul restaurant
- Location: 41.0316°N 28.9768°E; Kartal, Istanbul, Turkey
- Date: 9 March 2004
- Target: Freemasons
- Weapons: Car bomb and backpack bomb
- Deaths: 1
- Injuries: 5

On March 9, 2004, an attack on a restaurant in the Kartal district of Istanbul, Turkey killed Hüseyin Kurugöl, a waiter in the restaurant, and injured five others. The two Islamic militants who carried out the attack, Engin Vural and Nihat Doğruel, were holding automatic weapons and had ten homemade pipe bombs strapped to their flak jackets when they entered the restaurant frequented by freemasons. Shooting the guard in his feet, they entered the dining hall and began firing at the forty people in the room. Then they detonated bombs at the entrance, killing Kurugöl. One of the militants died in the attack, the other was seriously injured.

This attack occurred 911 days after the September 11 attacks. On March 11, the newspaper Al-Quds Al-Arabi received a statement which claimed that an al-Qaeda affiliated group, Jund al-Quds, ('Soldiers of Jerusalem'), had carried out the attack. The statement's primary purpose was to claim responsibility for the March 11, 2004 Madrid attacks.

In August 2004, the trial of the suspects began. While Turkish authorities said there was likely an al-Qaeda link, the surviving bomber, Engin Vural, claimed it was an independent act he planned along with the dead bomber, Nihat Doğruel. The prosecution charged that a man named Adem Çetinkaya, who was also charged, organized the attack and was also planning to bomb a private television station.
