= Hasanpaşa station =

Station of the Istanbul Metro

Hasanpaşa
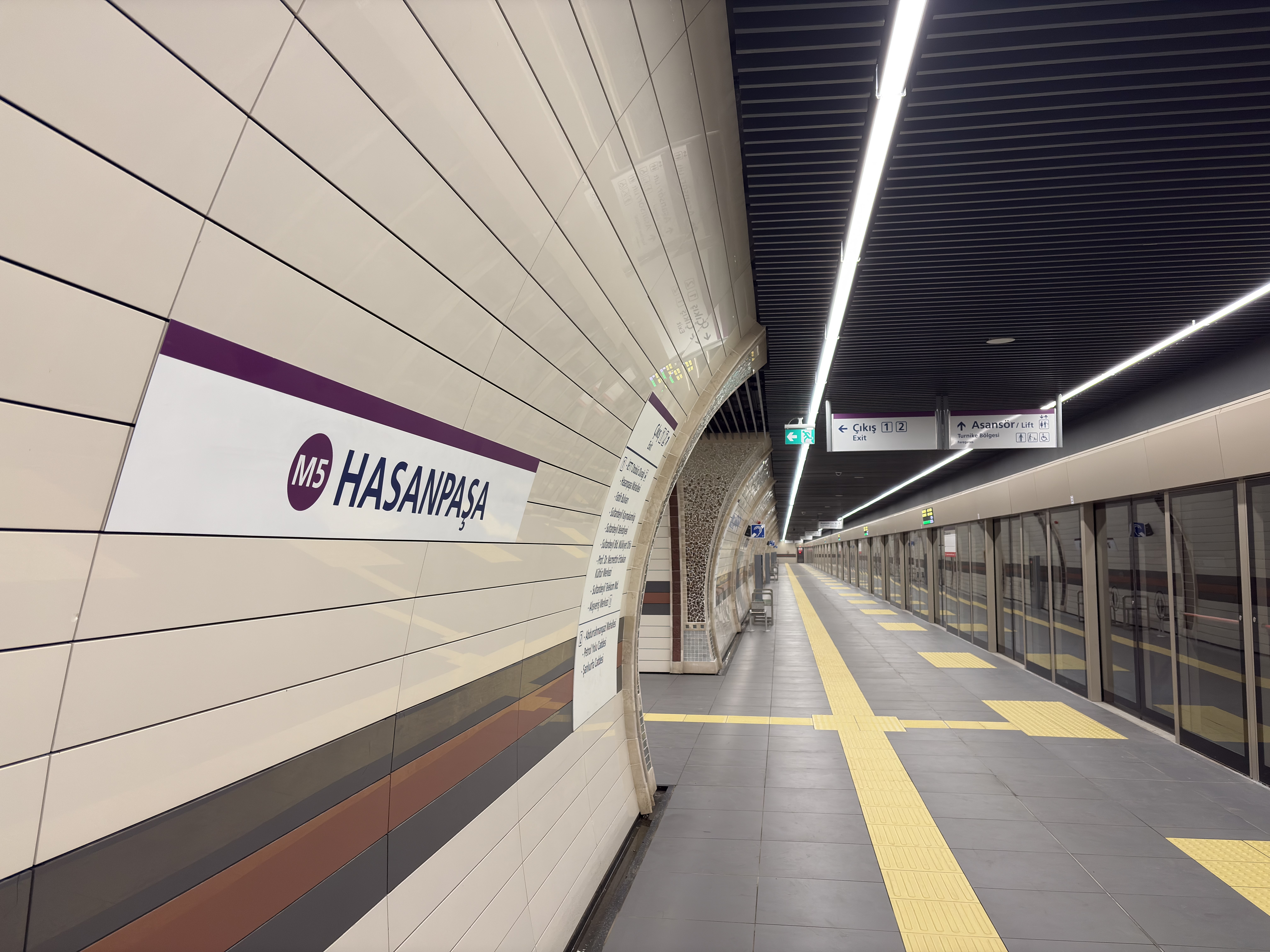
- Platform

General information
- Location: Hasanpaşa Neighborhood, Fatih Boulevard, 34920; Sultanbeyli, Istanbul; Turkey
- Coordinates: 40°58′7″N 29°15′17″E
- System: Istanbul Metro rapid transit station
- Owner: Istanbul Metropolitan Municipality
- Operator: Istanbul Metro
- Line: M5
- Platforms: 1 Island platform
- Tracks: 2
- Connections: İETT Bus: Fatih Sultan Mehmet Mezarlığı: 11ÜS, 122H, 131SB, 132C, 132M, 132P, 132SB, 132Z, 14KS, 14S, 18A, 18D, 18K, 18M, 18Ü, 18UK, 18YS, 522ST, SM1, SM4, SM6, UM73; Istanbul Minibus: Dudullu - Viaport, Kartal - Sultanbeyli

Construction
- Structure type: Underground
- Parking: No
- Cycle facilities: Yes
- Accessible: Yes

History
- Opened: 22 May 2026 (3 months ago)
- Electrified: 1,500 V DC Overhead line

Services
Preceding station	Istanbul Metro	Following station
Veysel Karani towards Üsküdar	M5 Line	Sultanbeyli Terminus
Location

Hasanpaşa is an underground station on the M5 line of the Istanbul Metro. It is located under Fatih Boulevard in the Hasanpaşa neighborhood of Sultanbeyli. It was opened on 22 May 2026.

There are 2 entrances at this station.

== Station layout ==
Platform level	Westbound	← toward Üsküdar (Veysel Karani)
Platform level	Island platform, doors will open on the left
Platform level	Eastbound	toward Sultanbeyli (terminus) →

== Operation information ==
The line operates between 06:00 and 00:00 with a train frequency of 4 minutes and 40 seconds during peak hours and 7 minutes at all other times. The line also operates night metro services between 00:00 and 06:00 on Saturdays and Sundays, with trains running every 30 minutes. This provides 66 hours of uninterrupted service between Friday and Sunday. During these hours, fares are charged at double the price. During this time, only Entrance 1 is open at this station.

== Gallery ==
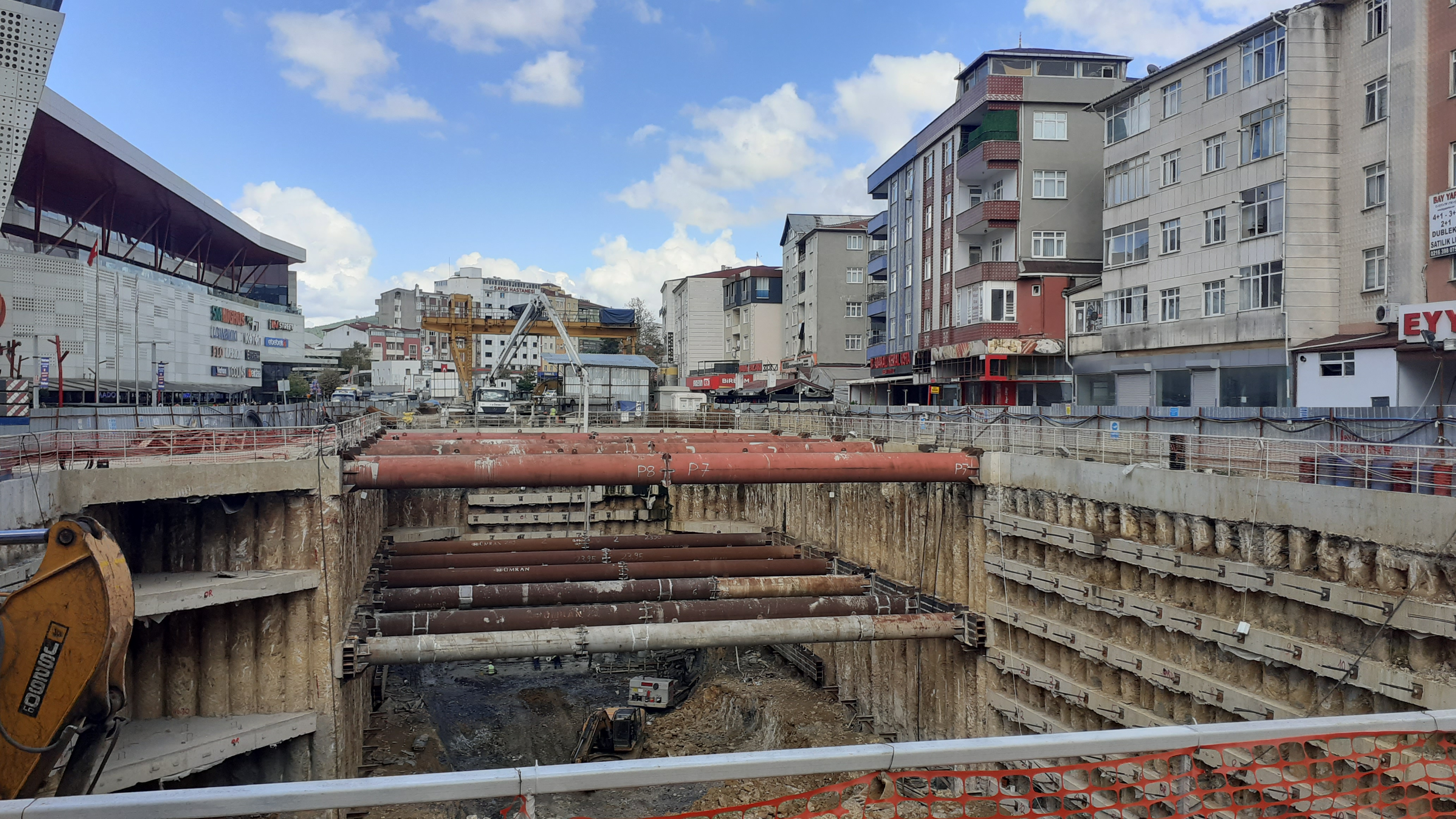
Construction site of the station in July 2022

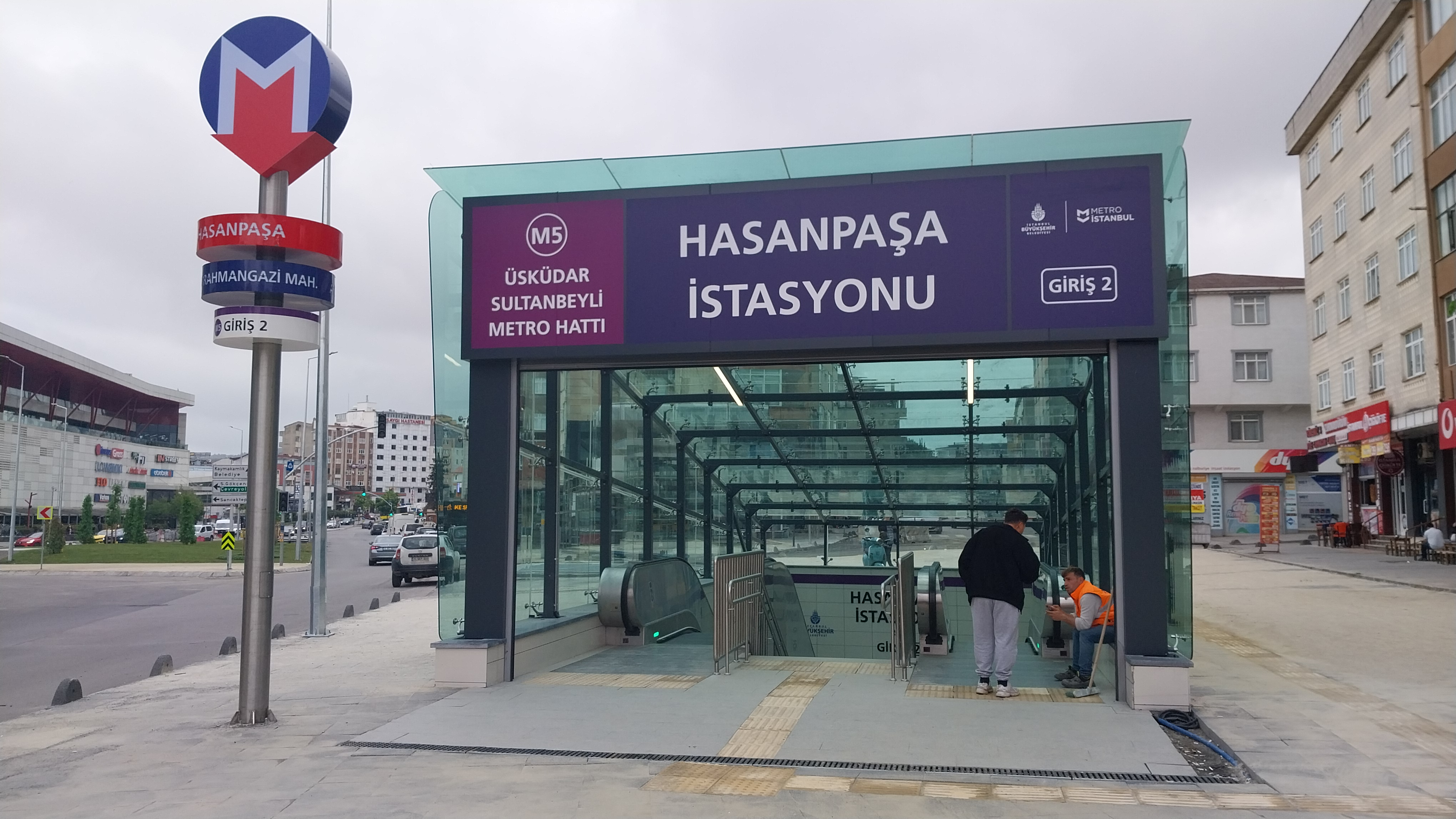
Entrance structure

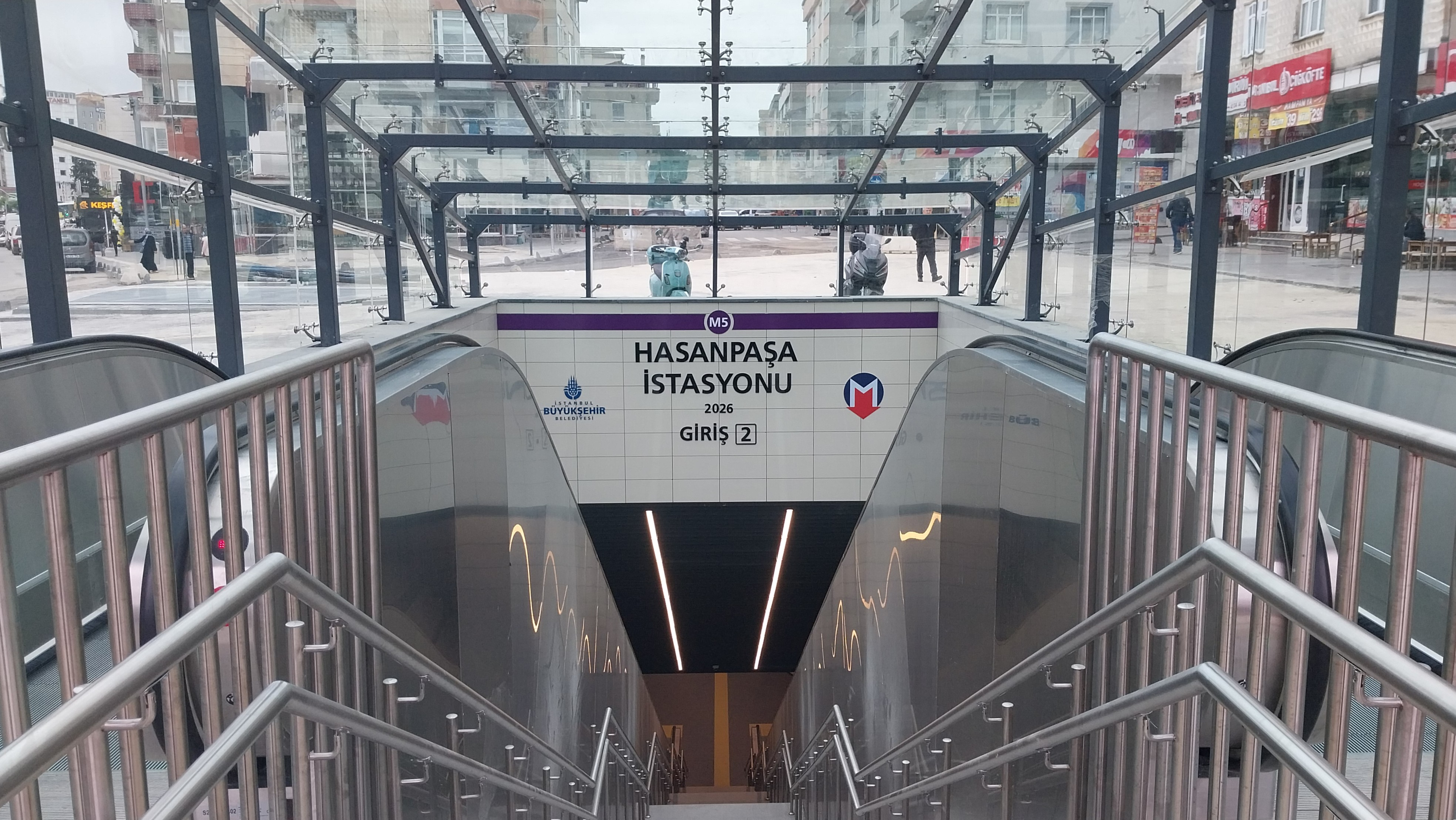
Entrance 2

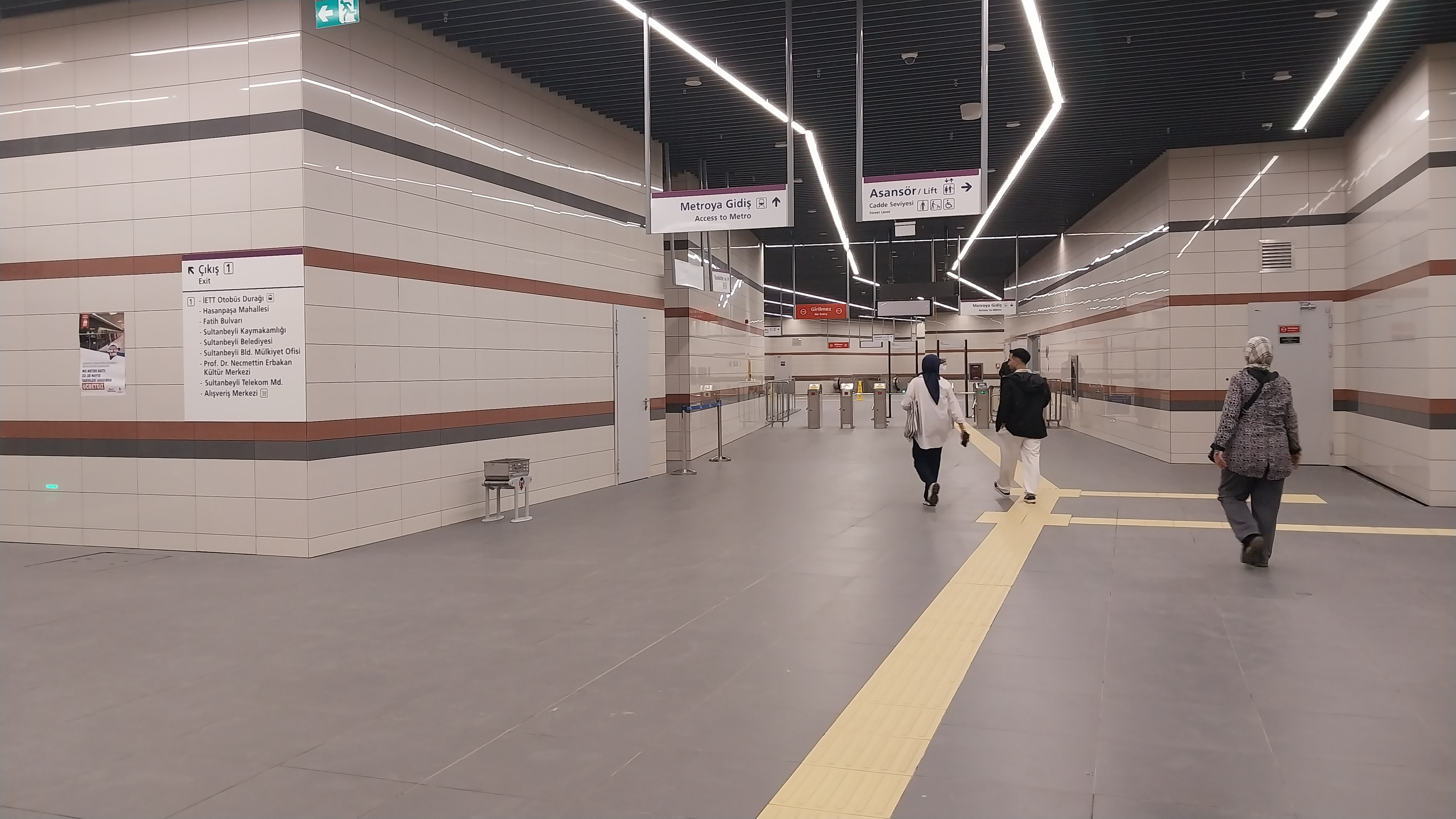
Ticket hall

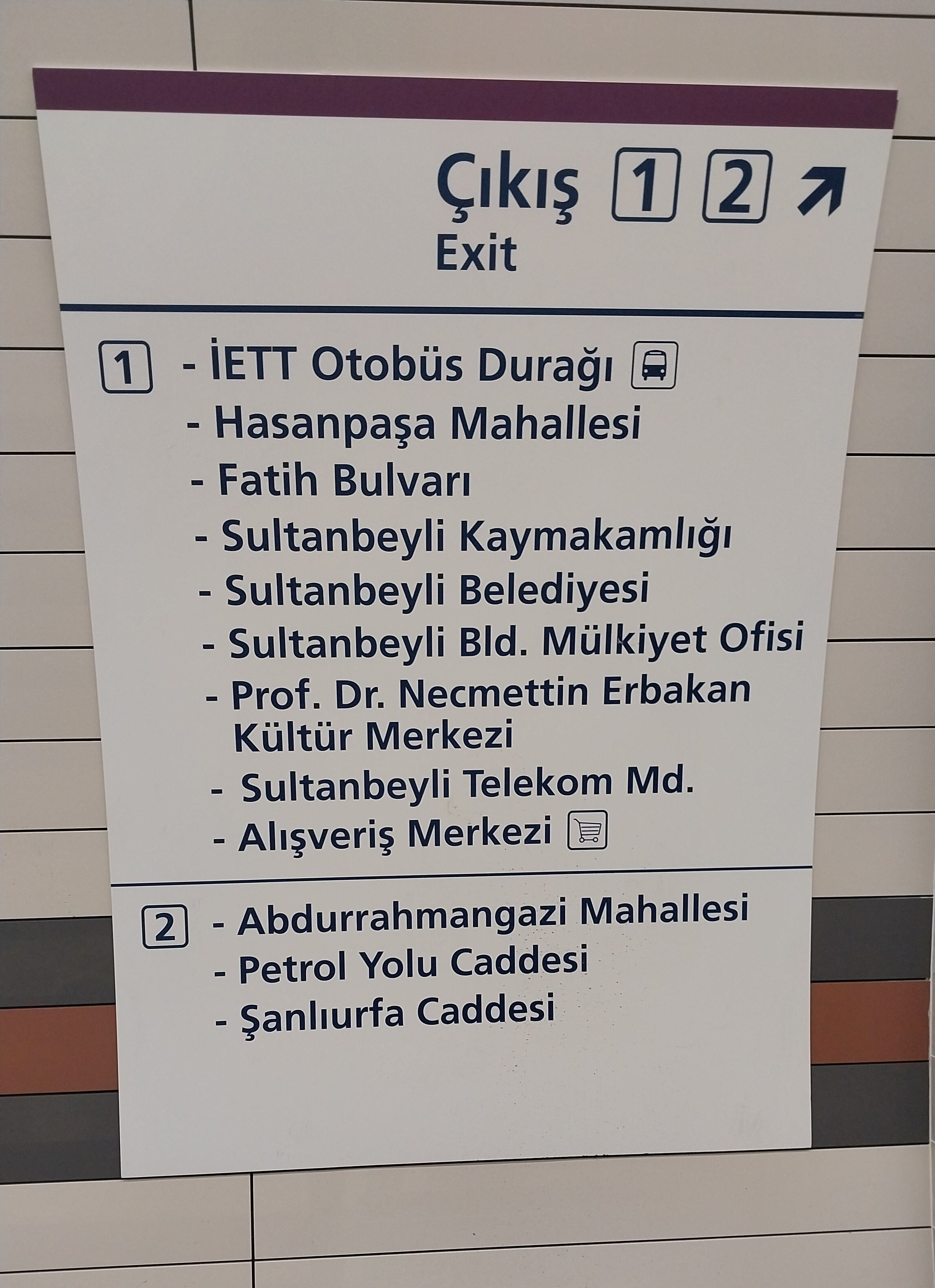
Exit sign
