= Muhammad Maarifi Mosque =

Mosque in Kartal, Istanbul, Turkey

Maarifi Mosque
- Maarifi Camii
- Location within Istanbul

Religion
- Affiliation: Islam

Location
- Municipality: Kartal, Istanbul
- Country: Turkey
- Interactive map of Maarifi Mosque
- Coordinates: 40.8883°N 29.1906°E

Architecture
- Type: mosque
- Established: 1976

The Maarifi Mosque (Turkish: Maarifi Camii) is a historic building in the Kartal district of Istanbul, Turkey. It was once a Rifa'i tekke but is now a mosque.

== Description ==
The mosque is made of wood, brick, and stone. The main prayer area is covered with a plastered wooden dome held up by twelve wooden columns. The twelve columns are said to represent the Twelve Imams.

== History ==
When the Rifa'i Sufi Muhammed Maʿrifî came to Istanbul with his murids, he settled in the Çavuşoğlu (now Kordonboyu) neighborhood of Kartal in a stone house built in 1818. At some point, he converted this house into a tekke. The tekke received aid from Sultan Mahmud II and the Ministry of Religious Foundations and the kitchen of the tekke operated as an imaret, distributing food to the poor.

During the time when the tekke complex was active, it included a semâhane (place for sama), a sheikh cell, a fukarâ (fakir) cell, an edebhâne (toilet), an abdesthâne (place for ablutions), two fevkânî (upper rooms), a tahtânî (lower room), a kitchen, and a well for water.

The complex was damaged in the earthquake of 1894, but repairs were begun immediately after.

After the closing of Sufi lodges by the government in 1925, the family of the last sheikh continued to use the harem section, but the rest of the complex fell into disrepair. By 1940, all that remained was the lodge's tevhidhane (place for prayer) and the tomb of Maʿrifî.

In 1964, the Mehmet Maʿrifî Yalvaçtorunları of the family of Maʿrifî had the tevhidhane and tomb repaired.

In 1976, residents of Kartal had the tevhidhane repaired, and it has been in use as a mosque since then. In 1980, the tomb was repaired again, and a son cemaat yeri (portico), minaret, and shadirvan were added to the mosque.

== Founder ==
Muhammad Maʿrifî was born in Egypt in 1719. He was the son of Ali Sabit al-Rifâî, a sheikh of the Sayyâdî branch of the Rifaʽi Sufi order and descendant of Ahmad al-Rifaʽi, founder of the order. Maʿrifî was also a Sayyid. Maʿrifî left Cairo for Anatolia some time after 1796. He settled first in Edirne, or possibly Tekirdağ, then in Kartal, where he remained till his death in 1824. He was buried in the garden of his tekke.
