= Kartal Park, Istanbul =

City park in İstanbul, Turkey

Kartal Park
- Kartal Parkı
- Interactive map of Kartal Park
- Location: Kartal, Istanbul, Turkey
- Coordinates: 40°53′10″N 29°10′55″E
- Area: 7,583 m^{2} (81,620 sq ft)
- Owner: Metropolitan Municipality of Istanbul

Kartal Park (Turkish: Kartal Parkı) is an urban public park in Kartal district of Istanbul, Turkey. It is owned by the Metropolitan Municipality of Istanbul. The park features artificial mist accompanied with colorful light effects and classical music attracting local residents in hot summer days.

Kartal Park is located alongside Turgut Özal Boulevard on the seashore of Sea of Marmara in Kartal district in Istanbul, Turkey. Owned by the Metropolitan Municipality is of Istanbul, the urban public park covers a total area of 7,583 m^{2} (81,620 sq ft). It as developed in two stages by adding a green area of 2,857 m^{2} (30,750 sq ft) later to the initial park with 4,723 m^{2} (50,840 sq ft) area.

72 palm trees are planted to both sides of the park, and 12 different seasonal flower vegetation decorates the park. Architectural structures of the park are arcades flanking the walk ways and long pools.

== Kartal Mist Park ==
In July 2018, a 4,723 m^{2} (50,840 sq ft)-covering part of the park was developed into a "mist park". Aerosol sprays around the pools create mist that is accompanied by colorful light effects and classical music. The feature as a mist park, which is unique in the country, attracts local residents and mainly children during the hot summer days.
