= Soğanlık Yeni =

Neighborhood in Istanbul, Turkey

Soğanlık Yeni is a neighborhood in Kartal District, Istanbul Province, Turkey. Its population is 27,806 (2025).

The neighborhood (mahalle) is located about 20 miles east of the historic center of Istanbul and about 4 miles north of the Sea of Marmara. It is bordered on the north by the Maltepe District, on the east by the neighborhoods of Gümüşpınar and Orta, and on the southwest by the neighborhoods of Esentepe and Cevizli. The TEM road (D.100) runs along the neighborhood's southwestern border.

The larger quarter (semt) of Soğanlık includes the Kartal neighborhoods of Soğanlık Yeni, Gümüşpınar, Orta, and Uğur Mumcu. The Gümüşpınar neighborhood developed around an old village called Soğanlık.

== Name ==
The neighborhood name means literally "Onion Field New" (soğan + -lik and yeni).

== Demographics ==
The neighborhood is mixed, socioeconomically, ethnically, and religiously. Important groups include Sunni Kurds from Siirt and Diyarbakır, Alevi Kurds from Erzincan, Georgians from Ordu, and Sunni Turks from various provinces.
