= Sultanbeyli =

District in Istanbul, Turkey

- District and municipality
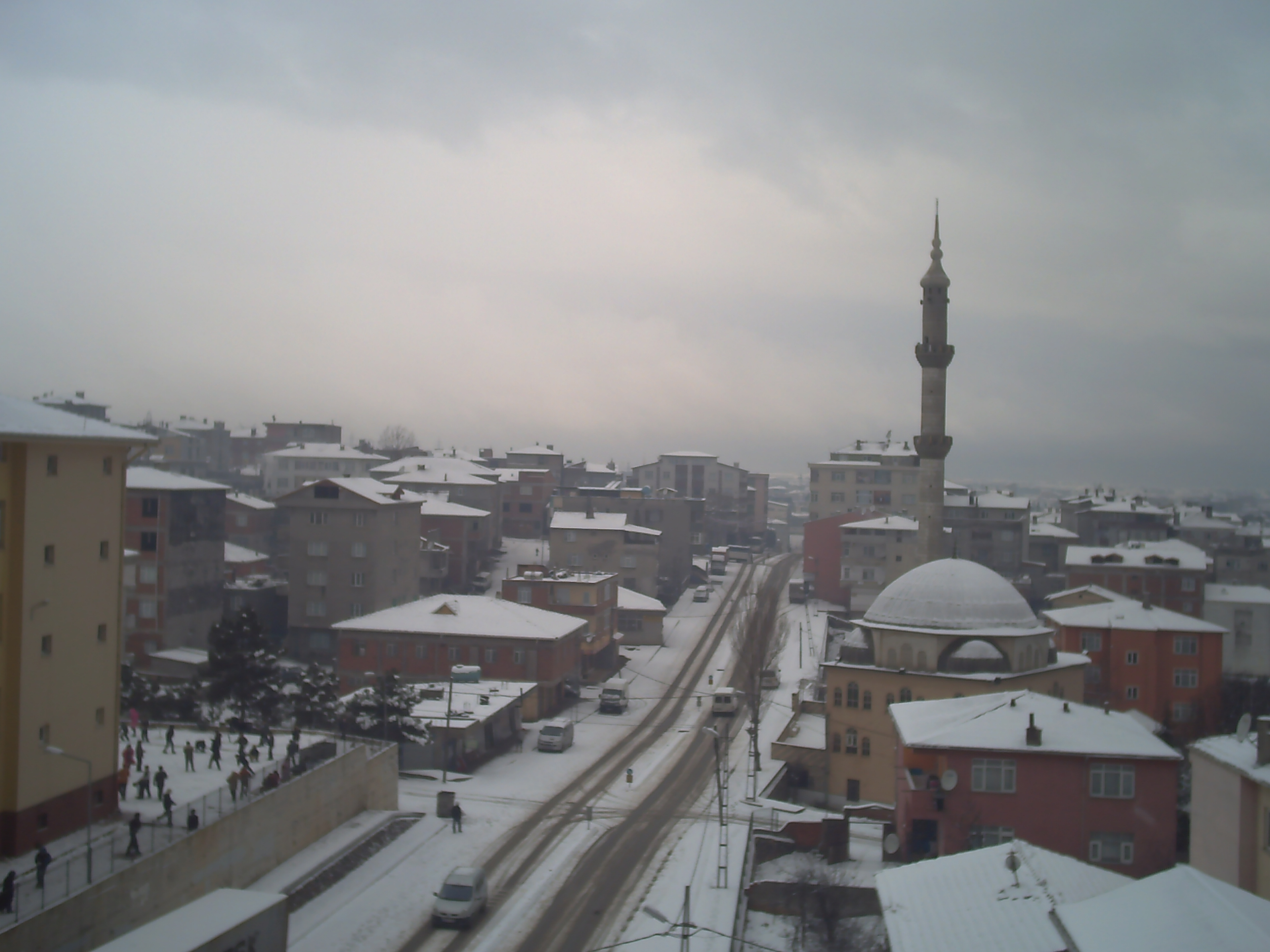
- Sultanbeyli in winter

- Logo

- Map showing Sultanbeyli District in Istanbul Province

- Location within Turkey Location within Istanbul
- Coordinates: 40°58′06″N 29°15′42″E
- Country: Turkey
- Province: Istanbul

Government
  - Mayor: Ali Tombaş (AKP)
- Area: 29 km^{2} (11 sq mi)
- Elevation: 130 m (430 ft)
- Population (2022): 358,201
  - Density: 12,000/km^{2} (32,000/sq mi)
- Time zone: UTC+3 (TRT)
- Area code: 0216
- Website: www.sultanbeyli.bel.tr

Sultanbeyli (pronounced [sulˈtanbejli]) is a municipality and district of Istanbul Province, Turkey. Its area is 29 km^{2}, and its population is 358,201 (2022). It is located inland on the Asian side (Anadolu Yakasi) of the city. The mayor is Ali Tombaş of the Justice and Development Party. Sultanbeyli is a landlocked district, bordered by Sancaktepe to the west, Pendik to the east and Kartal to the south-west. The district is served by two metro stations, Hasanpaşa and Sultanbeyli.

== History ==
Historically the Sultanbeyli area was farmland on the far outskirts of Istanbul until 1945 when the large land holdings of the Ottoman period were broken up, and 7,500 acres of land around the old Ankara-Istanbul road was paralyzed for the settlement of Turkish migrants from Bulgaria. In 1957, Sultanbeyli was formally organized as a village; after its establishment, some shareholders began to sell their plots of land. The handover of the title deed for these sales could not be carried out because the forestry administration put restrictions on Sultanbeyli, but the sales continued.

Sultanbeyli became a large settlement center in the late 1980s following the connection of the O-4 Motorway to the newly constructed Fatih Sultan Mehmet Bridge in 1988. The new transport links made the village an attractive location for settlement, and between 1985 and 1990, Sultanbeyli's population skyrocketed from 3,741 to 82,298. On December 31, 1987, the decision was made to establish Sultanbeyli as a municipality in the Kartal district of Istanbul, however, the administrative problems caused by the excessive population increase led to the first municipal elections only being held on 26 March 1989, and to the municipality being separated from Kartal into its own district in 1992. This caused Sultanbeyli to develop a reputation as a slum, but it has since transitioned into a working class suburb.

== Demographics ==
Historical population
Year	Pop.	±% p.a.
1985	3,741	—
1990	82,298	+85.56%
1997	144,932	+8.42%
2007	272,758	+6.53%
2012	302,388	+2.08%
2017	329,985	+1.76%
2022	358,201	+1.65%
Source: 1985 census, 1990 census, 1997 census and TÜIK (2007-2022)

== Composition ==
There are 15 neighbourhoods in Sultanbeyli District:

- Abdurrahmangazi
- Adil
- Ahmet Yesevi
- Akşemseddin
- Battalgazi
- Fatih
- Hamidiye
- Hasanpaşa
- Mecidiye
- Mehmet Akif
- Mimar Sinan
- Necip Fazıl
- Orhan Gazi
- Turgut Reis
- Yavuz Selim
