= Yakacık Çarşı =

- Neighbourhood
- Location in Turkey Yakacık Çarşı (Istanbul)
- Coordinates: 40°54′59″N 29°13′20″E
- Country: Turkey
- Province: Istanbul
- District: Kartal
- Population (2022): 17,825
- Time zone: UTC+3 (TRT)

Yakacık Çarşı is a neighbourhood in the municipality and district of Kartal, Istanbul Province, Turkey. As of 2022, its population is 17,825.

== Transport ==
Metro

- M4 Kadıköy-Tavşantepe (extension to Sabiha Gökçen International Airport is under construction)
