= Kartal Cemevi =

Architectural structure

Kartal Cemevi is a cemevi of Alevi Muslims located in Kartal district of Istanbul.

Kartal Cemevi Foundation was created under the name "Kartal Cemevi Culture, Education and Social Assistance Association" in 1993. The land for the Cemevi was requested by Kartal's mayor, Mehmet Ali Büklü.

The architecture of the building was designed by Gökçe Gencay. Most of the cost of the building was sponsored by local businessman.

The association was turned into a foundation in 1996.

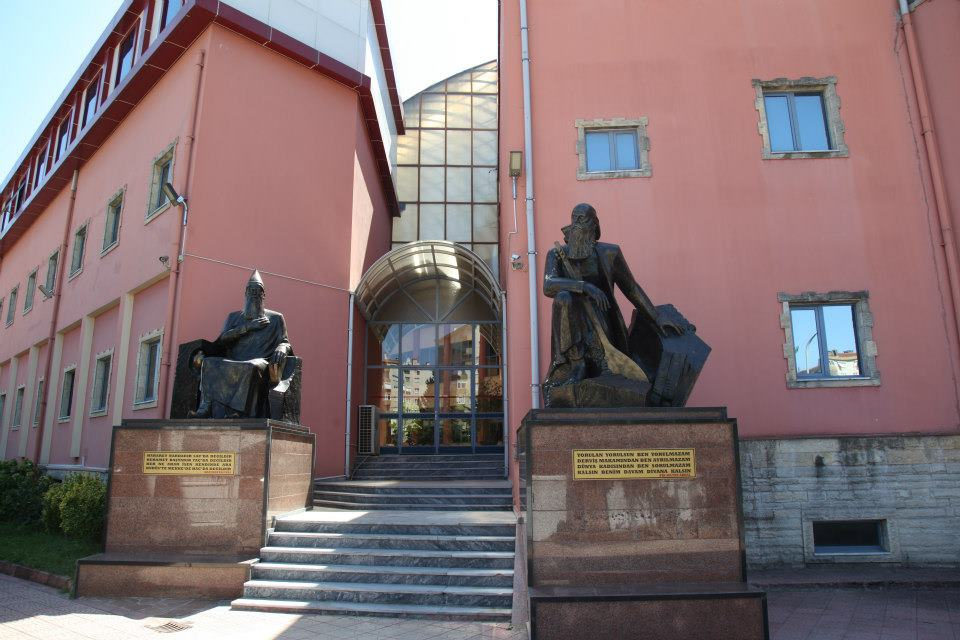
Kartal Cemevi

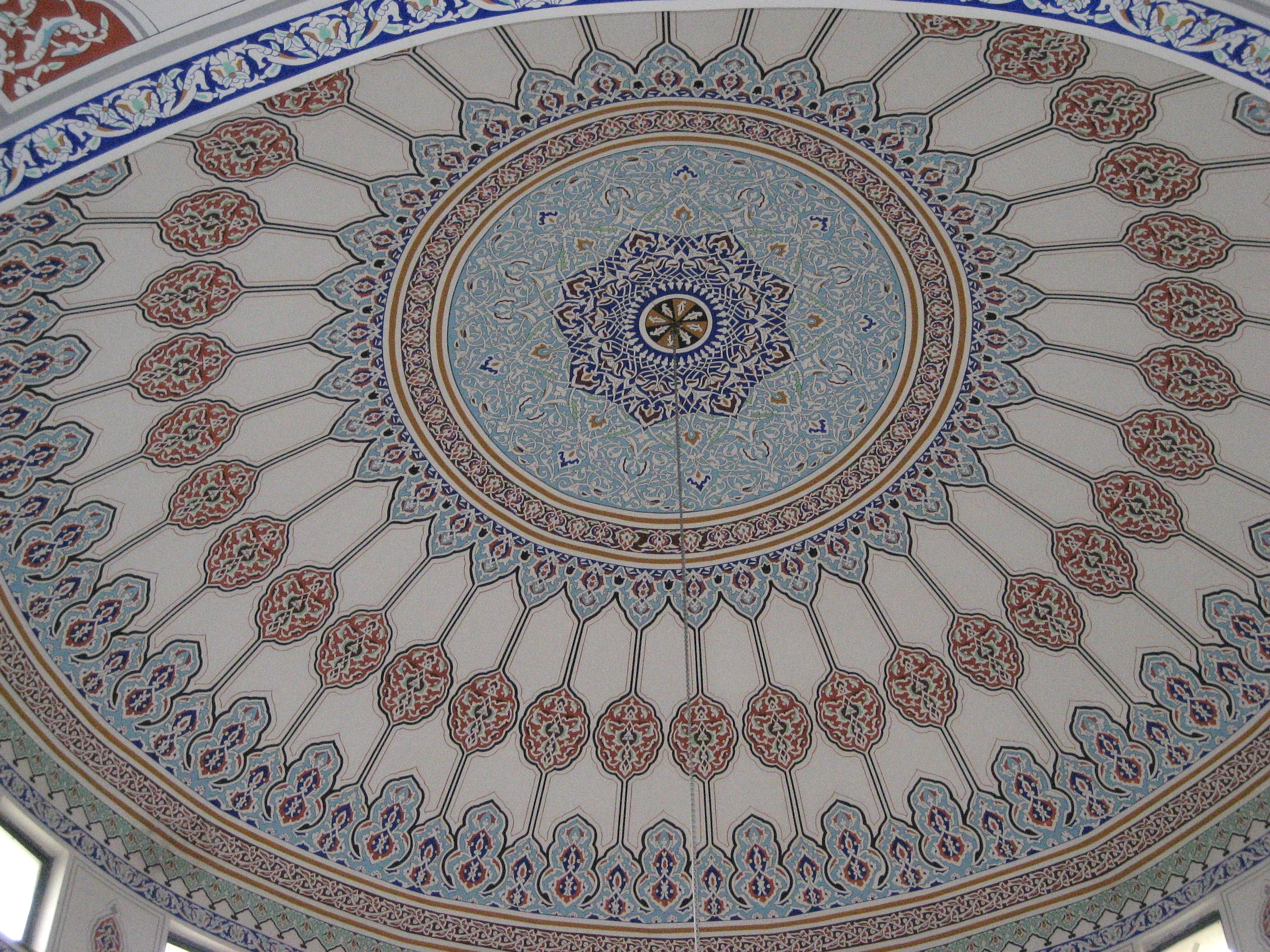
Ceiling of the Kartal Cemevi
