= Kartal (name) =

Kartal is a masculine Turkish given name and a surname. In Turkish, "Kartal" means "eagle".

== People ==
=== Given name ===
- Kartal Demirağ, Turkish failed assassin
- Kartal Özmızrak (born 1995), Turkish basketball player
- Kartal Tibet (1939–2021), Turkish actor and film director
- Kartal Yılmaz (born 2000), Turkish football player

=== Surname ===
- Ayhan Kartal (1966–2000), Turkish rapist and child killer
- Erhan Kartal (born 1993), Turkish football player
- Erhan Can Kartal (born 1998), Turkish actor
- Hüseyin Kartal (born 1982), Turkish football player
- İsmail Kartal (born 1961), Turkish football player and manager
- Kazım Kartal (1936–2003), Turkish actor
- Nemanja Kartal (born 1994), Montenegrin football player
- Şaban Kartal (1952–1998), Yugoslav-born Turkish football player
- Sonay Kartal (born 2001), British tennis player
