= Pendik =

- District and municipality
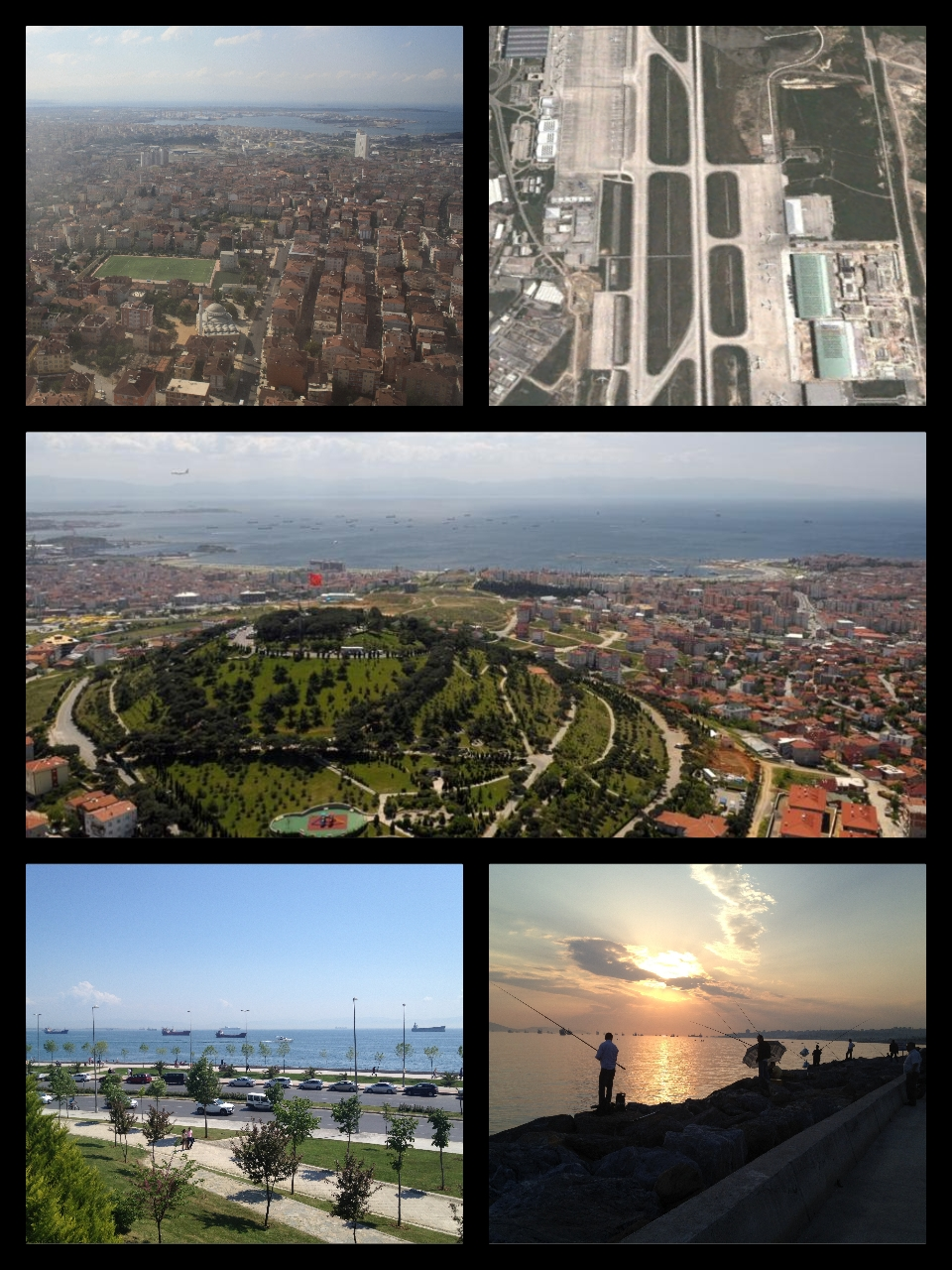
- A collage of Pendik, Upper left: Pendik Stadium, Upper right: Sabiha Gökçen International Airport, Middle: Kusbakisi Pendik, Lower left: Pendik Sahilyolu (Pendik Coastal Road), Lower right: Sunset in Pendik

- Logo

- Map showing Pendik District in Istanbul Province

- Location within Turkey Location within Istanbul
- Coordinates: 40°52′29″N 29°14′06″E
- Country: Turkey
- Province: Istanbul

Government
  - Mayor: Ahmet Cin (AKP)
- Area: 190 km^{2} (73 sq mi)
- Population (2022): 750,435
  - Density: 3,900/km^{2} (10,000/sq mi)
- Time zone: UTC+3 (TRT)
- Area code: 0216
- Website: www.pendik.bel.tr

Pendik (Turkish pronunciation: [ˈpændic]) is a municipality and district of Istanbul Province, Turkey. Its area is 190 km^{2}, and its population is 750,435 (2022). It is on the Asian side between Kartal and Tuzla, on the Marmara Sea. It also neighbours Sultanbeyli, Sancaktepe and Çekmeköy from northwest, Şile from north and Gebze from northeast. The district is home to the Sabiha Gökçen International Airport.

During the Roman, Byzantine and Latin Empire periods, the coastal town was known as Pantichium.

== Composition ==
There are 36 neighbourhoods in Pendik District:

- Ahmet Yesevi
- Bahçelievler
- Ballıca
- Batı
- Çamçeşme
- Çamlık
- Çınardere
- Doğu
- Dumlupınar
- Emirli
- Ertuğrul Gazi
- Esenler
- Esenyalı
- Fatih
- Fevzi Çakmak
- Göçbeyli
- Güllü Bağlar
- Güzelyalı
- Harmandere
- Kavakpınar
- Kaynarca
- Kurna
- Kurtdoğmuş
- Kurtköy
- Orhangazi
- Orta
- Ramazanoğlu
- Sanayi
- Sapanbağları
- Şeyhli
- Sülüntepe
- Velibaba
- Yayalar
- Yeni
- Yenişehir
- Yeşilbağlar

== Pendik today ==
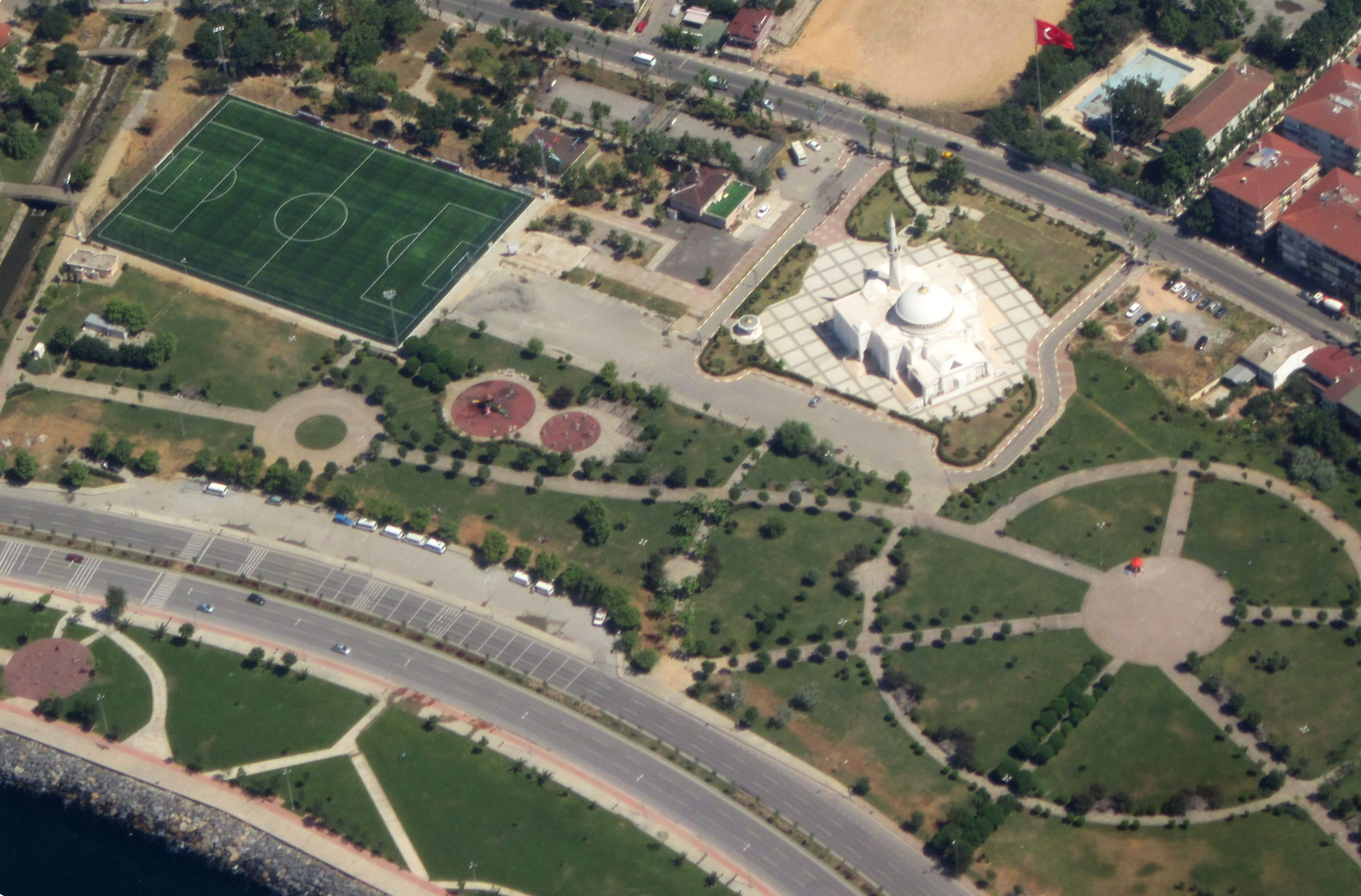
Dumankaya mosque in Batı neighbourhood

Until the 1970s Pendik was a rural area, far from the city. Today Pendik is a crowded mix of working class housing (especially further towards the E5 motorway) with more expensive apartments with sea views along the coast. There is a busy shopping district (with a large street market on Saturdays), restaurants and movie theaters. Pendik is far from downtown Istanbul. It is served by Marmaray suburban trains. Since 25 July 2014, high-speed services to Ankara start from this station, pending termination of the upgrades on the line to Istanbul proper. In 2016, an extension of the M4 line of the Istanbul Metro was completed. The Pendik metro station is located about 1 kilometre (0.62 mi) north of the railway station. The coastal road is fast but does not carry public transport, except for the bus 16A which only runs until 8 pm and the Kadikoy-Bostanci-Pendik dolmus. There is road construction going on in the Pendik/Tuzla/Gebze region, which has seen industrial development in the 1990s. Over the centuries, Bosniaks have migrated to Turkey, with a large number arriving after the Austro-Hungarian campaign in Bosnia and Herzegovina in 1878. Many settled in the Pendik boroughs of Sapanbağları, Yeşilbağlar and Bahçelievler. Apart from naming their streets and shops after their village in Bosnia, these people have blended into the Istanbul working-class lifestyle of the rest of Pendik.

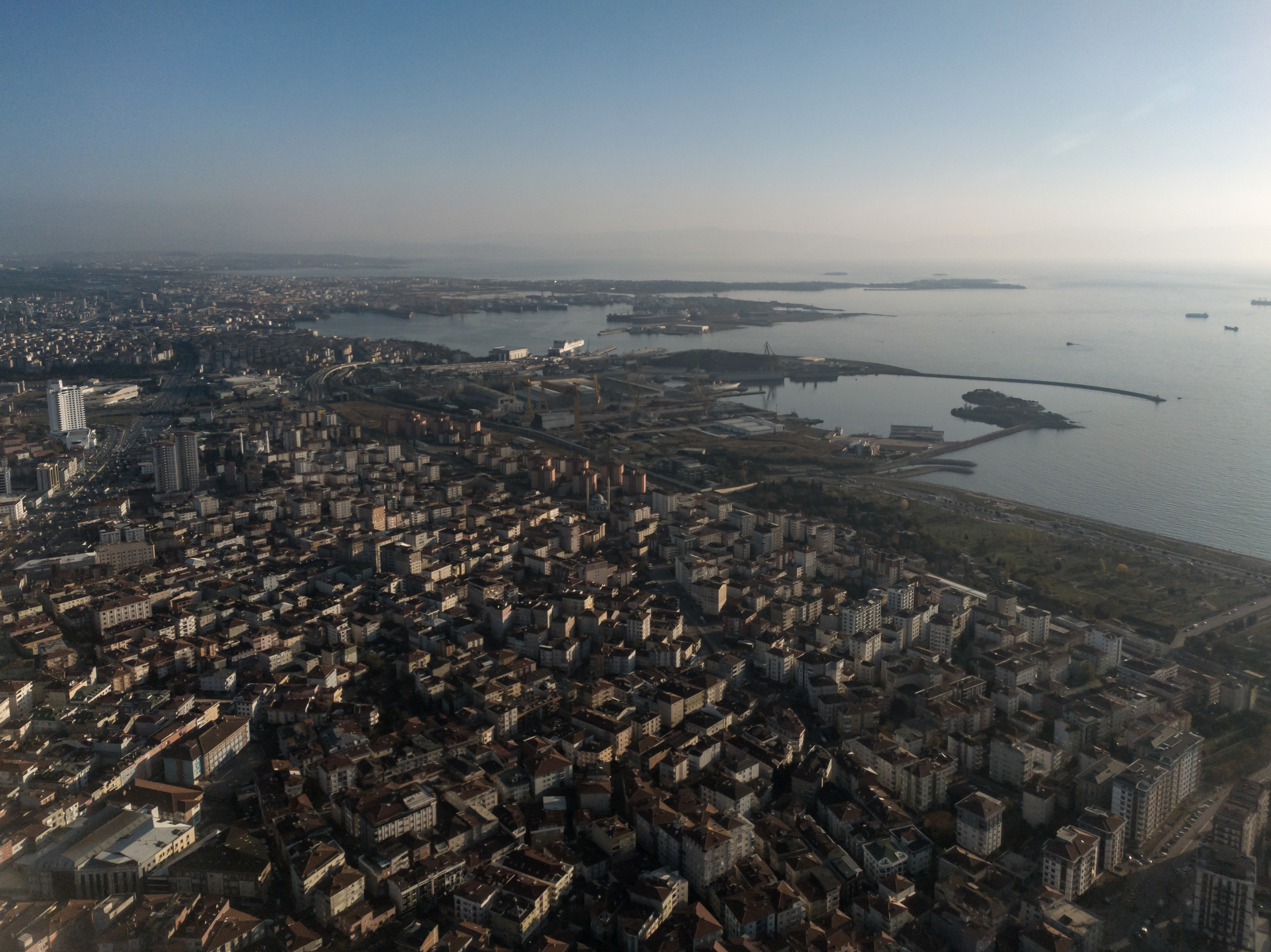
Aerial view of Pendik

In the late 1990s two private educational institutions were built inland from Pendik, Koç Özel Lisesi and Sabancı University. The area has a Formula One racetrack. There is a high-speed boat across the Marmara Sea to Yalova for people travelling out of the city to Bursa and the Aegean. Sabiha Gökçen airport is near. The current mayor is Ahmet Cin from AK Parti.

== Climate ==
Pendik experiences a Mediterranean climate (Csa/Cs) according to both Köppen and Trewartha climate classifications, with cool winters and warm to hot summers. A warm district, it is in USDA hardiness zone 9a and AHS heat zone 4, allowing the cultivation of certain cold-hardy subtropical plants. While in southern Istanbul, it is still affected by Foehn winds, because of its position north of the highlands in Yalova.

Climate data for Kurtköy, Istanbul
Month	Jan	Feb	Mar	Apr	May	Jun	Jul	Aug	Sep	Oct	Nov	Dec	Year
Mean daily maximum °C (°F)	9.3 (48.7)	10.0 (50.0)	11.8 (53.2)	16.9 (62.4)	21.7 (71.1)	26.2 (79.2)	28.5 (83.3)	28.3 (82.9)	25.1 (77.2)	19.9 (67.8)	15.7 (60.3)	11.7 (53.1)	18.8 (65.8)
Daily mean °C (°F)	6.1 (43.0)	6.7 (44.1)	8.0 (46.4)	12.4 (54.3)	16.8 (62.2)	21.0 (69.8)	23.3 (73.9)	23.3 (73.9)	20.3 (68.5)	15.9 (60.6)	12.1 (53.8)	8.5 (47.3)	14.5 (58.2)
Mean daily minimum °C (°F)	2.8 (37.0)	3.3 (37.9)	4.1 (39.4)	7.8 (46.0)	11.8 (53.2)	15.8 (60.4)	18.1 (64.6)	18.3 (64.9)	15.4 (59.7)	11.8 (53.2)	8.4 (47.1)	5.3 (41.5)	10.2 (50.4)
Average precipitation mm (inches)	97.5 (3.84)	79.8 (3.14)	64.0 (2.52)	55.9 (2.20)	52.0 (2.05)	46.4 (1.83)	24.0 (0.94)	43.4 (1.71)	58.3 (2.30)	59.9 (2.36)	62.6 (2.46)	88.6 (3.49)	732.4 (28.84)
Average extreme snow depth cm (inches)	20.2 (8.0)	9.5 (3.7)	4.8 (1.9)	0 (0)	0 (0)	0 (0)	0 (0)	0 (0)	0 (0)	0 (0)	0 (0)	3.0 (1.2)	23.4 (9.2)
Average precipitation days (≥ 0.1 mm)	18	16	14	12	11	9	4	7	10	12	14	17	144
Average snowy days (≥ 0.1 cm)	2	3	1	0	0	0	0	0	0	0	0	1	7
Mean monthly sunshine hours	63.6	80.8	123.1	170.0	226.3	266.6	279.8	265.8	199.5	158.5	104.6	72.0	2,010.6
Mean daily sunshine hours	2.1	2.8	3.9	5.6	7.3	8.8	9.0	8.6	6.7	5.1	3.4	2.3	5.5
Percentage possible sunshine	21	25	32	43	52	58	60	61	55	46	34	26	43

== Sport ==
The women's football team Pendik Çamlık Spor play in the Turkish Super League.

The Pendik Stadium is home to Pendikspor.

== Twin cities ==
- Comrat, Moldova
- Novi Pazar, Serbia
- Targu-Jiu, Romania
- Kispest, Hungary
