= Libyssa =

Town in ancient Bithynia

Coordinates: 40°46′10″N 29°32′23″E

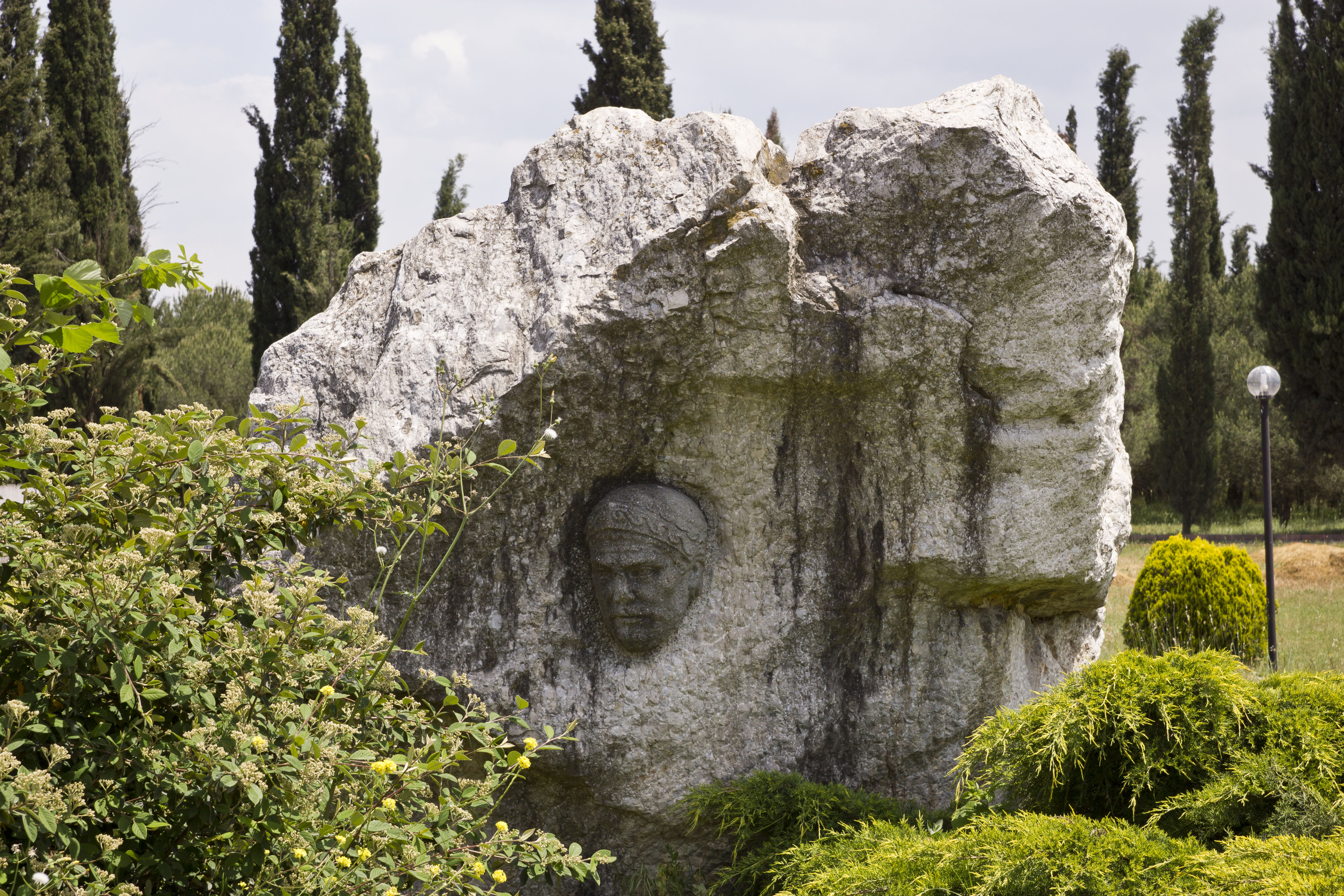
The Tomb of Hannibal, erected in 1934 on the orders of Mustafa Kemal Atatürk.

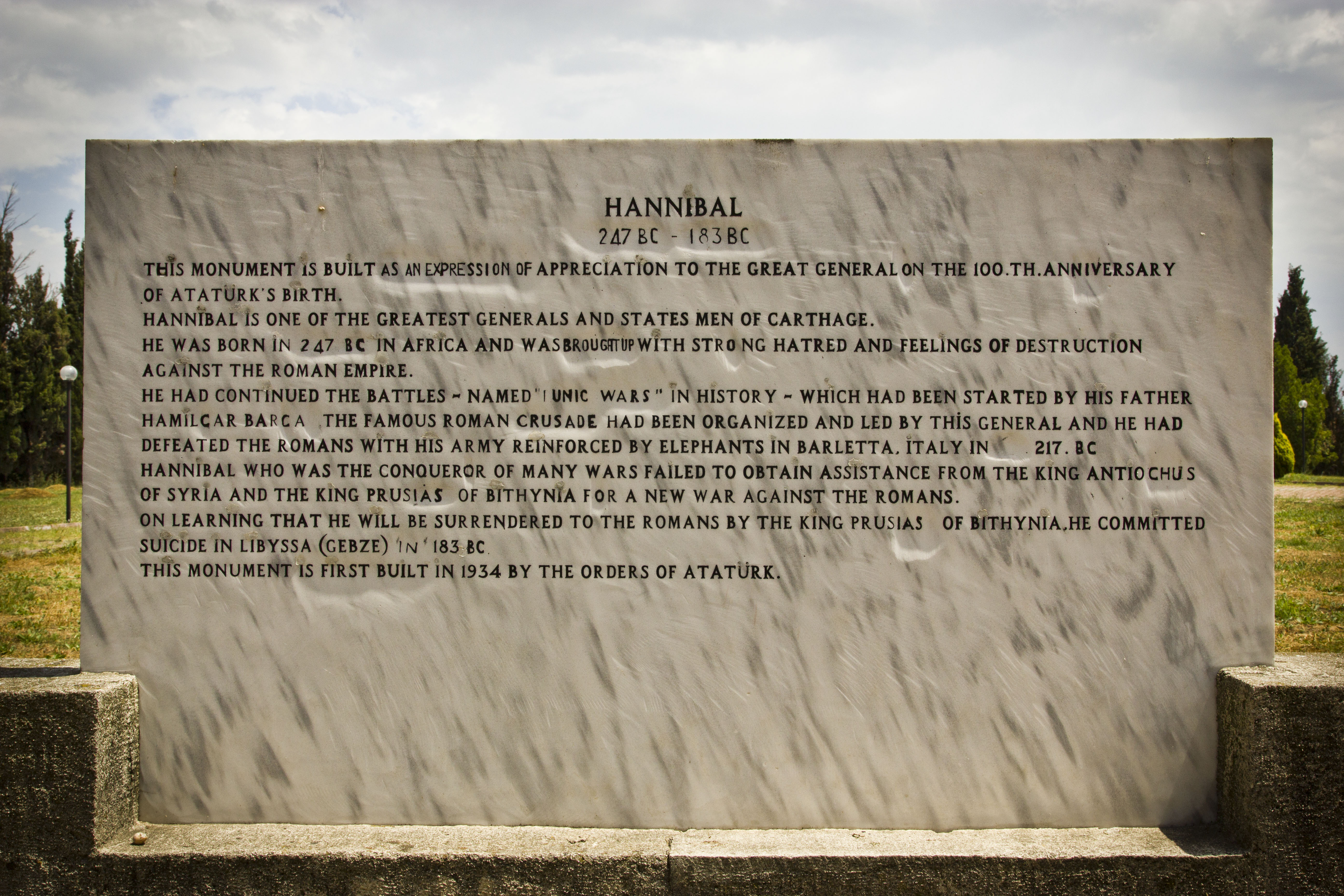
Inscription placed in 1981.

Libyssa (Ancient Greek: Λίβυσσα) or Libysa (Λίβισσα), was a town on the north coast of the Sinus

Astacenus in ancient Bithynia, on the road from Nicaea to Chalcedon. It was celebrated in antiquity as the place containing the tomb of the Carthaginian general Hannibal. In Pliny the Elder's time the town no longer existed, but the spot was noticed only because of the tumulus of Hannibal.

The site of ancient Libyssa is located within the modern district of Gebze in Kocaeli Province, at the coast of the Gulf of İzmit, near the city of İzmit (ancient Nicomedia) in northwestern Anatolia, Turkey. Mustafa Kemal Atatürk, the founding father of the Republic of Turkey, revered and admired Hannibal so much he honored him with a symbolic tomb close to where Hannibal had died.
