= Kartal =

- District and municipality
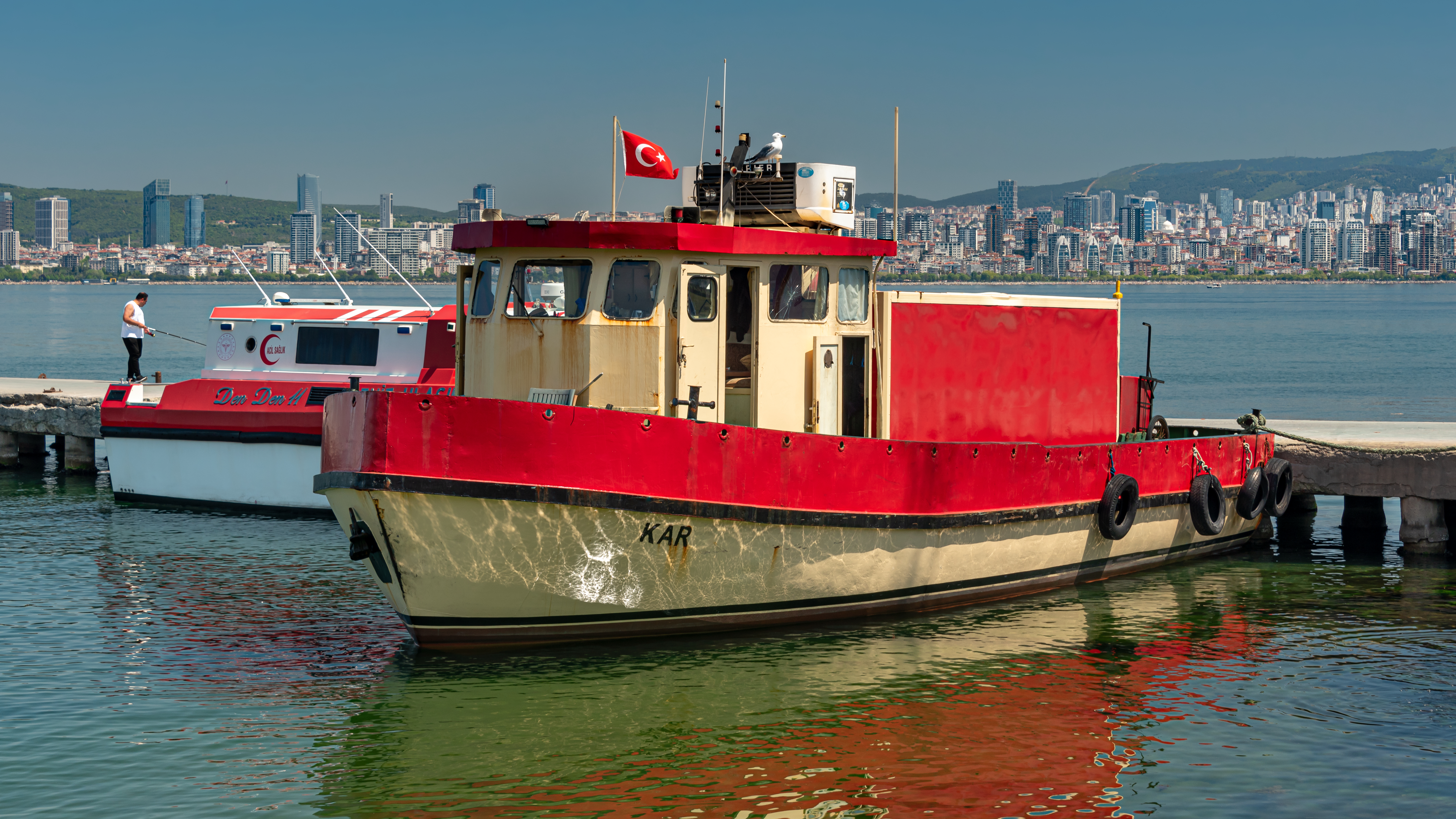
- Skyline of Kartal and Maltepe in the background, as seen from Büyükada

- Logo

- Map showing Kartal District in Istanbul Province

- Location within Turkey Location within Istanbul
- Coordinates: 40°53′14″N 29°11′24″E
- Country: Turkey
- Province: Istanbul

Government
  - Mayor: Gökhan Yüksel (CHP)
- Area: 38 km^{2} (15 sq mi)
- Population (2022): 483,418
  - Density: 13,000/km^{2} (33,000/sq mi)
- Time zone: UTC+3 (TRT)
- Area code: 0216
- Website: www.kartal.bel.tr

Kartal (Turkish: [ˈkaɾtaɫ]) is a municipality and district of Istanbul Province, Turkey. Its area is 38 km^{2}, and its population is 483,418 (2022). It is located on the Asian side of the city, on the coast of the Marmara Sea between Maltepe and Pendik.

Despite being far from the city centre, Kartal is heavily populated (total population nearly 500,000). The district's neighbours are Maltepe to the west, Sultanbeyli and Sancaktepe to the north and Pendik to the east. Inland from the coast, the land rises sharply up to the hills Yakacık and Aydos, the latter of which is the highest point in Istanbul.

== History ==
Kartal ('eagle' in Turkish, by folk etymology) was a fishing village on the shore of the Marmara Sea during the Byzantine Empire, called Kartalimen or Kartalimin in Greek, and was founded at the beginning of the 6th century. In the 11th century, the town was conquered by the ruler of the Seljuks, Suleyman Shah. In 1329, Kartal became part of the Ottoman Empire, the Byzantines re-took the city in 1403, however, and held it for 17 years before losing it to the Ottomans again.

According to the Ottoman General Census of 1881/82-1893, the kaza of Kartal had a total population of 12,969, consisting of 6,920 Greeks, 5,095 Muslims, 869 Armenians, 3 Catholics, 1 Jew and 81 foreign citizens.

By 1947, Kartal was an industrial area and with the introduction of commuter trains to Haydarpaşa Terminal from Gebze in 1973, Kartal became even more important as an industrial area of Istanbul. However, the current trend is that factories are being closed down and moved inland. For example, the large cement factory on the shore, which is to be converted into a cultural center, was closed in 2003.

There is a historical Roman bath ruin near Dragos Hill, which is being recovered by the Istanbul Archaeology Museums, with the financial support of Kartal Municipality.

In 2008, parts of Kartal were merged with parts of Ümraniye to form the new district of Sancaktepe.

== Kartal today ==
Luxury apartment complexes have been built on the coast, along with much more housing inland and this has attracted more shops and infrastructure.

Housing is of good-quality in general. Building near the coast slowed after the 1999 earthquake, when people became aware that a major fault line runs just off this coast. However, building on the high ground inland is proceeding apace.

On 4 June 2007, the Greater Istanbul Municipality and the former mayor of Kartal announced that a new urban city environment would be built in Kartal-Pendik. The plan includes a central business district, luxury residential developments, cultural facilities such as concert halls, museums, and theatres, and leisure locations including a marina and tourist hotels.

Kartal is the terminal station of Kadıköy - Sabiha Gökçen Airport metro line. The Marmaray for commuter trains also passes through Kartal.

== Geography ==
The coast of Kartal has sandy and clay soils, whereas the northern part of the district is mostly silica. On Yakacık Hill, there are limestone and quartz deposits.

The streams of Paşaköy, Kavaklıdere and Fındıklı feed the reservoir behind the Ömerli Dam.

=== Composition ===
There are 20 neighbourhoods in Kartal District:

- Atalar
- Çavuşoğlu
- Cevizli
- Cumhuriyet
- Esentepe
- Gümüşpınar
- Hürriyet
- Karlıktepe
- Kordonboyu
- Orhantepe
- Orta
- Petrol Iş
- Soğanlık Yeni
- Topselvi
- Uğur Mumcu
- Yakacık Çarşı
- Yakacık Yeni
- Yalı
- Yukarı
- Yunus

== Religion ==
The majority religion of today's Kartal is Islam. Kartal Cemevi is one of the several Alevi temples in Istanbul. Kartal Surp Nişan Armenian Orthodox Church (Holy Cross Armenian Church) is an Armenian Church located on the downtown of Kartal. Muhammad Maarifi Mosque which is also in Kartal features the mausoleum of the founder of the Maarifi Islamic order. There are seventy mosques within the district.

== Sport ==
- Eczacıbaşı Sports Hall, Kartal, 2025-built home ground of Eczacıbaşı Volleyball.

== Transport ==
Metro

- M4 Kadıköy - Sabiha Gökçen Airport metro line

Train Line

- Marmaray Train Line

Ferryboats

- Kartal - Princes' Islands boats

== Recreation ==
A part of the Kartal Park was developed in July 2018 as a "mist" park" featuring articial mist, colorful light effects and classical music attracting local residents and mainly children during hot summer days.

== Sister towns ==
- Ardino, Bulgaria
- Asparuhovo, Bulgaria
- Banovići, Bosnia and Herzegovina
- Bor, Niğde, Turkey
- Buzovna, Azerbaijan
- Gölpazarı, Bilecik, Turkey
- Çüngüş, Diyarbakır, Turkey
- Damal, Ardahan, Turkey
- Agios Amvrosios, Northern Cyprus
- Gölpazarı, Bilecik, Turkey
- Hacıbektaş, Niğde, Turkey
- (Turkey) İmrenler, Konya
- Ilfov, Romania
- Kemalpaşa, Artvin, Turkey
- Mudurnu, Bursa, Turkey
- Ovacık, Tunceli, Turkey
- Ömerli, Mardin, Turkey
- Pınarhisar, Kırklareli, Turkey
- Sjenica, Serbia
- Subaşı, Yalova, Turkey
- Visoko, Bosnia and Herzegovina

== See also ==
- List of districts of Istanbul
- 9 March 2004, attack on Istanbul restaurant
