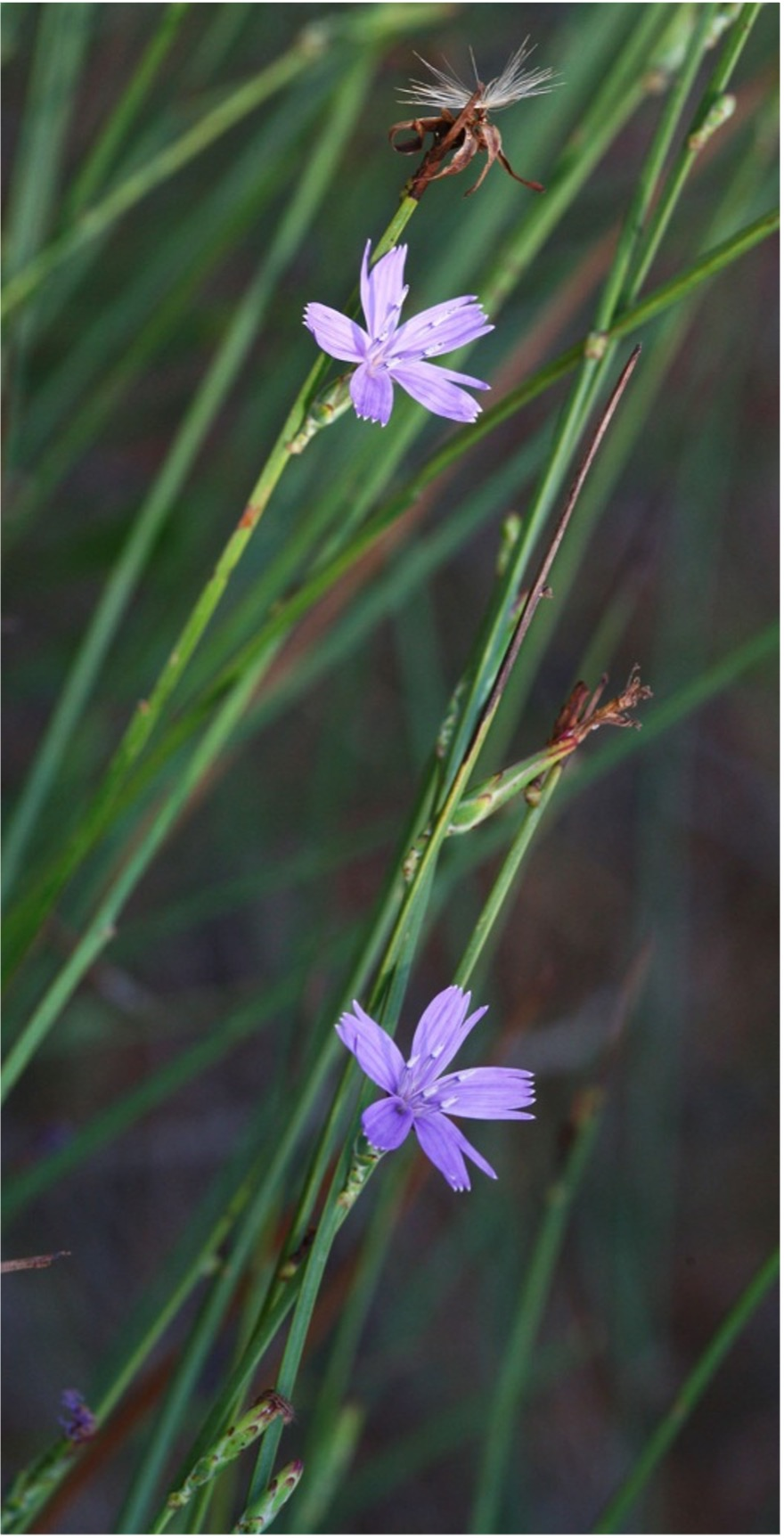
- Astartoseris triquetra in Lebanon

Scientific classification
- Kingdom: Plantae
- Clade: Tracheophytes
- Clade: Angiosperms
- Clade: Eudicots
- Clade: Asterids
- Order: Asterales
- Family: Asteraceae
- Genus: Astartoseris; N.Kilian, Hand, Hadjik., Christodoulou & Bou Dagh.
- Species: A. triquetra

Binomial name
- Astartoseris triquetra (Labill.) N.Kilian, Hand, Hadjik., Christodoulou & Bou Dagher

Synonyms
- Chondrilla triquetra Steud.; Lactuca triquetra (Labill.) Boiss.; Lygodesmia triquetra D.Don; Prenanthes triquetra Labill.; Scariola triquetra (Labill.) Soják

= Astartoseris =

Species of flowering plant

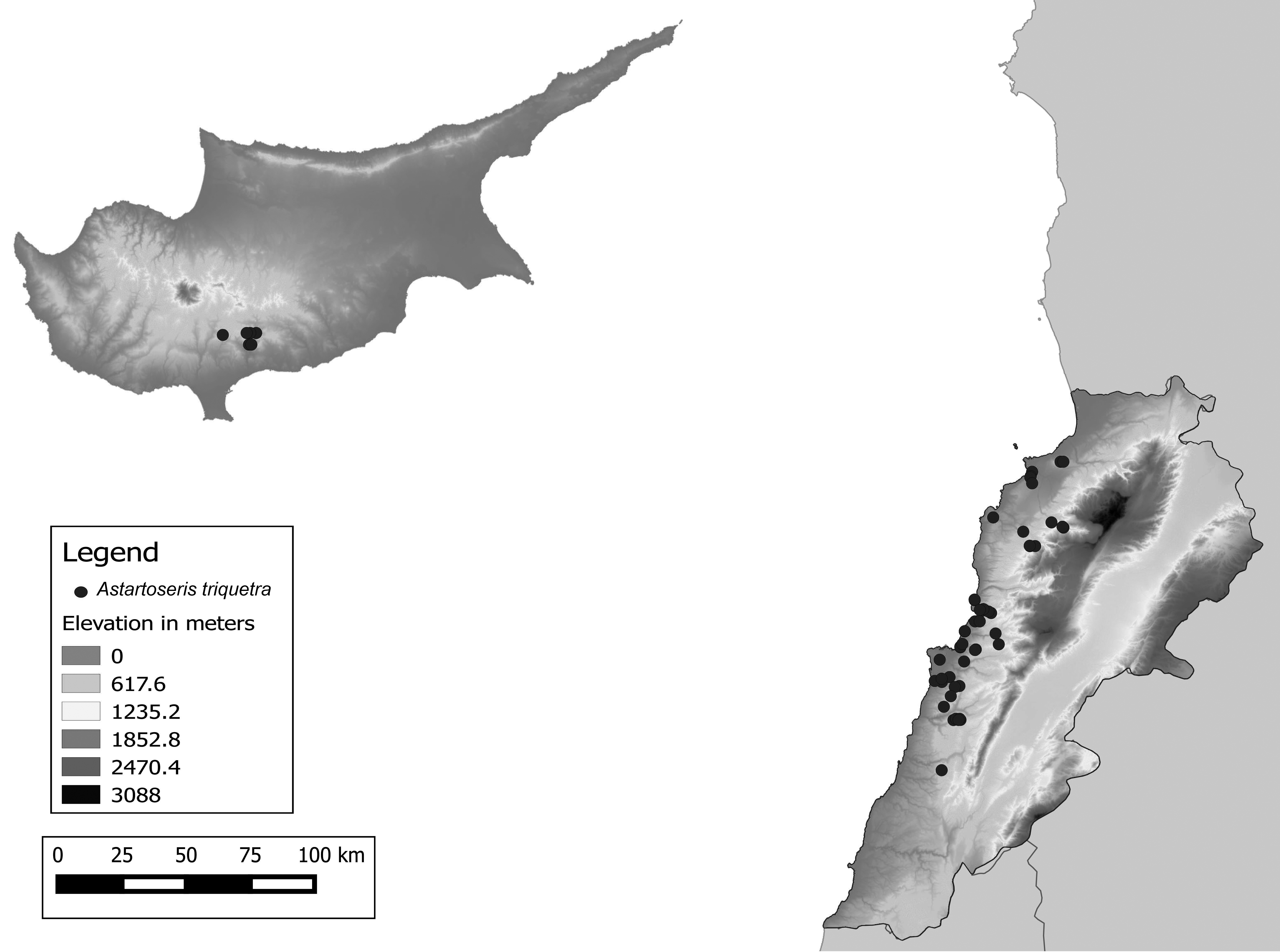
Geographical distribution map of Astartoseris triquetra

Astartoseris is a monotypic genus of flowering plants belonging to the family Asteraceae. It only contains one known species, Astartoseris triquetra.

It is native to Cyprus, Lebanon and Syria.

The genus name of Astartoseris is in honour of Astarte, the Hellenized form of the Ancient Near Eastern goddess Ashtart or Athtart (Northwest Semitic), a deity closely related to Ishtar (East Semitic), worshipped from the Bronze Age through classical antiquity. The Latin specific epithet of triquetra means three cornered. Both the genus and the species were first described and published in Willdenowia Vol.47 on page 120 in 2017.
