= Hebrew religion =

Hebrew religion may refer to:

- Canaanite religion
- Judaism

== See also ==
- Ancient Semitic religion
- Hebrew mythology (disambiguation)
- Religions of the ancient Near East
