= Hebrew mythology =

Hebrew mythology may refer to:

- Canaanite religion
- Jewish mythology

== See also ==
- Ancient Semitic religion
- Hebrew religion (disambiguation)
- Middle Eastern mythology (disambiguation)
