= Major religious groups =

The 2020 global percentage of adherents by religion.
1. Christianity (28.8%)
2. Islam (25.6%)
3. Unaffiliated (24.2%)
4. Hinduism (14.9%)
5. Buddhism (4.10%)
6. Other religions (2.40%)

The world's principal religions and spiritual traditions may be classified into a small number of major groups, though this is not a uniform practice. This theory began in the 18th century with the goal of recognizing the relative degrees of civility in different societies, but this concept of a ranking order has since fallen into disrepute in many contemporary cultures.

== Religious demographics ==
A map of major denominations and religions according to the Pew Research Center's 2010 study The Future of World Religions: Population Growth Projections, 2010-2050

One way to define a major religion is by the number of current adherents. The population numbers by religion are computed by a combination of census reports and population surveys, in countries where religion data is not collected in census, for example the United States or France. Results can vary widely depending on the way questions are phrased, the definitions of religion used and the bias of the agencies or organizations conducting the survey. Informal or unorganized religions are especially difficult to count.

There is no consensus among researchers as to the best methodology for determining the religiosity profile of the world's population. A number of fundamental aspects are unresolved:

- Whether to count "historically predominant religious culture(s)".
- Whether to count only those who actively "practice" a particular religion.
- Whether to count based on a concept of "self-identification as adherents".
- Whether to count only those who expressly self-identify with a particular denomination.
- Whether to count only adults, or to include children as well.
- Whether to rely on official government-provided statistics.
- Whether to use multiple sources and ranges or single "best source(s)".

Pew Research Centre's 2025 report on religious changes from 2010-2020, had Christians as the world's largest group at 2.3 billion representing 28.8%, 2 billion Muslims at 25.6%, 1.9 billion Religiously unaffiliated at 24.2%, 1.2 billion Hindus at 14.9%, 300 million Buddhists at 4.1%, 200 million Other religions at 2.2%, and 10 million Jews at 0.2%.

=== Largest religious groups ===
Religion	Followers (billions)	Cultural tradition	Founded	References
Christianity	2.3	Abrahamic religions	Judaea (Middle East), c. 30 CE	
Islam	2.0	Abrahamic religions	Hejaz (Middle East), c. 610 CE	
Irreligion	1.9	Secularism	Worldwide	
Hinduism	1.2	Indian religions	Indian subcontinent, c. 20th to 17th century BCE	
Buddhism	0.3	Indian religions	Nepal, c. 5th century BCE	
Folk religion	0.2	Regional	Worldwide	

=== Medium-sized religions ===
Religion	Followers (millions)	Cultural tradition	Founded	References
Shinto	89	Japanese religions	Japan, unknown origin date	
Taoism	12–173	Chinese religions	China, 2nd century CE	
Yoruba Religion	50–100	African religions	Yorubaland, unknown origin date	
Voodoo	60	African religions	Dahomey, unknown origin date	
Sikhism	25–30	Indian religions	Indian subcontinent, 15th century	
Ahmadiyya	10–20	Abrahamic religions and New religious movements	Indian subcontinent, 19th century	
Judaism	15	Abrahamic religions	Judah (Middle East), 6th to 5th century BCE	
Spiritism	5–15	Abrahamic religions and New religious movements	France, 19th century	
Mu-ism	5–15	Korean religions	Korea, unknown origin date	
Unification Church	10	Abrahamic religions and New religious movements	South Korea, 1954	
Ayyavazhi	10	Indian religions and New religious movements	South India, 19th century	
Baháʼí Faith	7.3	Abrahamic religions and New religious movements	Persia, 19th century	(Note: Historically, the Baháʼí Faith arose in 19th-century Persia, in the context of Shia Islam, and thus may be classed on this basis as a divergent strand of Islam, placing it in the Abrahamic tradition. However, the Baháʼí Faith considers itself an independent religious tradition, which draws from Islam but also other traditions. The Baháʼí Faith may also be classed as a new religious movement, due to its comparatively recent origin, or may be considered sufficiently old and established for such classification to not be applicable.)
Confucianism	6–7	Chinese religions	China, 6th to 5th century BCE	
Sarnaism	5	Indian religions	Chota Nagpur Plateau, Unknown	
Jainism	4–5	Indian religions	Indian subcontinent, 7th to 9th century BCE	
Cheondoism	3–4	Korean religions and New religious movements	Korea, 19th century	
World Mission Society Church of God	3.9	Abrahamic religions and New religious movements	South Korea, 1964	
Hoahaoism	1.5–3	Vietnamese religions	Vietnam, 20th century	
Iglesia ni Cristo	2.8	Abrahamic religions and New religious movements	Philippines, 1913	
Tengrism	2	Animism	Central Asia, unknown origin date	
Ravidassia	1.5–2	Indian religions and New religious movements	Indian subcontinent, 2010	
Caodaism	1.1–3	Vietnamese religions	Vietnam, 20th century	
Tenriism	1.2	Japanese religions	Japan, 19th century	
Druze	1	Abrahamic religions	Egypt, 9th century	
Rastafari	1	Abrahamic religions and New religious movements	Jamaica, 1930s	
Yarsanism	1	Abrahamic religions and Iranian religions	Iran, 14th century	

=== Small-sized religions ===
Religion	Followers	Cultural tradition	Founded	References
Wicca	800,000	Modern paganism (New religious movements)	United Kingdom, 1954 CE	
Yazidism	300,000–500,000	Kurdish religions	Kurdistan, 16th to 14th century CE	
Assianism	200,000–450,000	Iranian religions and Modern paganism (New religious movements)	Ossetia, 1980s	
Donyi-Polo	370,000	Indian religions and New religious movements	Indian subcontinent, 1970	
Native American Church	300,000	Native American religions and New religious movements	United States, 19th century	
Sanamahism	222,422	Indian religions	Manipur, 10th century BCE	
Zoroastrianism	121,962	Iranian religions	Iran, 16th to 14th century BCE	
Rodnovery	22,000–777,000	Modern paganism (New religious movements)	Eastern Europe, 1930s-1950s	
Mandaeism	60,000–70,000	Abrahamic religions and Iranian religions	Middle East, 1st to 3rd century CE	
Happy Science	13,000–38,000	Japanese religions and New religious movements	Japan, 1986	
Shugendō	6,000	Japanese religions	Japan, 7th century CE	
Roman reconstructionism	3,200	Modern paganism (New religious movements)	Italy, 1970s; Roots in Ancient Rome	
Samaritanism	900	Abrahamic religions	Judah, 6th to 5th century BCE	

== By region ==
- Religions by country according to The World Factbook – CIA
- Religion by region
- Religion in Africa
- Religion in Antarctica
- Religion in Asia
  - Religion in the Middle East
  - Muslim world (SW Asia and N Africa)
- Religion in Europe
  - Religion in the European Union
  - Christian world
- Religion in North America
- Religion in Oceania
- Religion in South America

== Trends in adherence ==
Trends in adherence
	1970–1985 (%)	1990–2000 (%)	2000–2005 (%)	1970–2010 (%)
Baháʼí Faith	3.65	2.28	1.70	4.26
Buddhism	1.67	1.09		2.76
Christianity	1.64	1.36	1.32	2.10
Confucianism				0.83
Hinduism	2.34	1.69	1.57	2.62
Islam	2.74	2.13	1.84	4.23
Jainism				2.60
Judaism	1.09			-0.03
Sikhism		1.87	1.62	3.08
Shinto				-0.83
Taoism				9.85
Zoroastrianism				2.5
Neopaganism	7.03	4.52	2.28	8.30
unaffiliated				0.37

== Maps of self-reported adherence ==
A 2015 map showing self-reported religiosity by country.

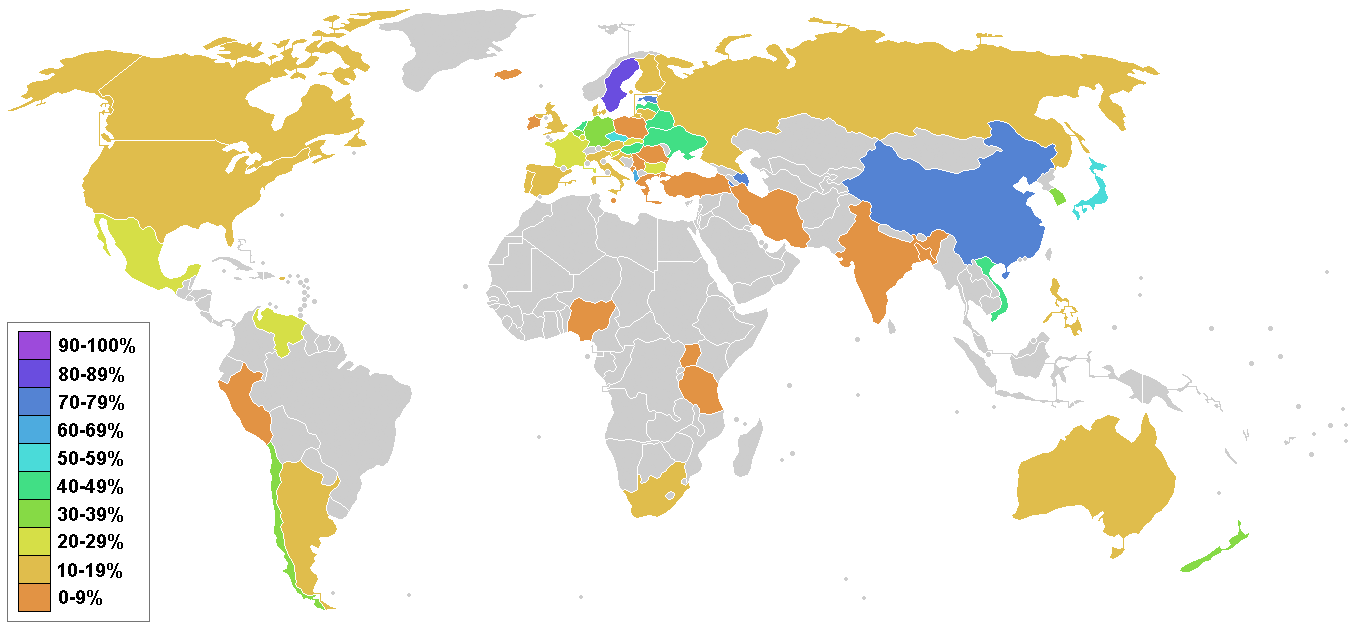
A 2002 map showing the percentages of people who regard religion as "non-important".

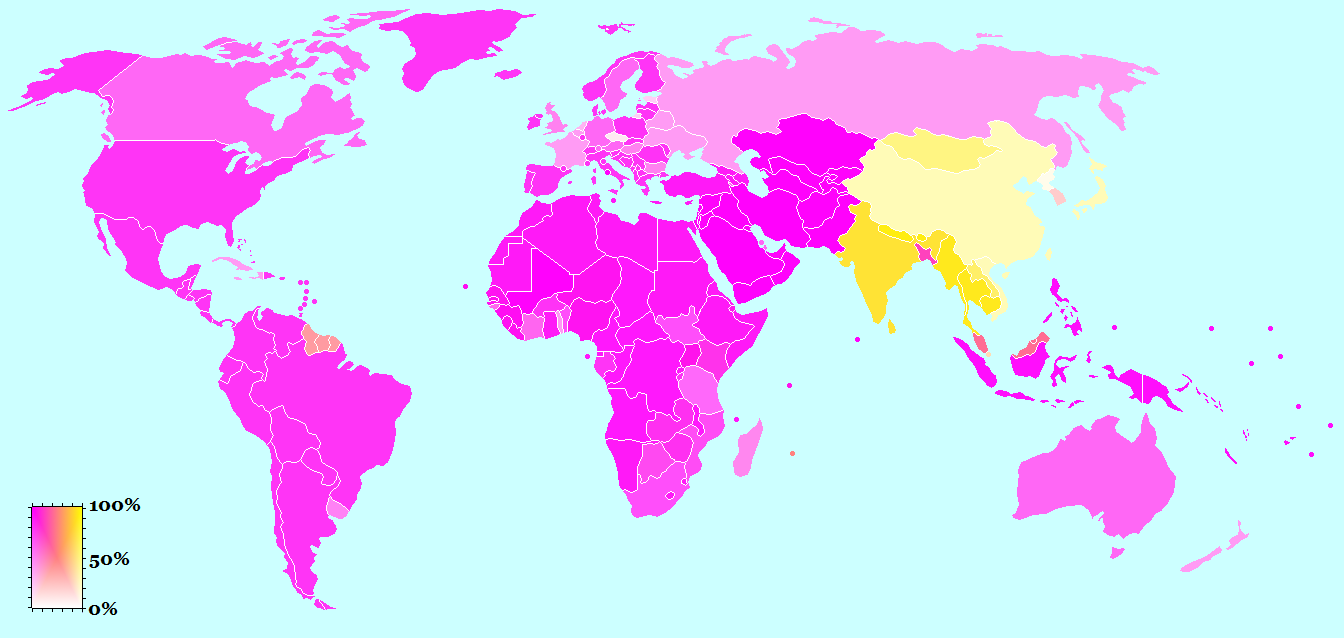
A map showing the prevalence of "Abrahamic religion" (purple), and "Indian religion" (yellow) religions in each country

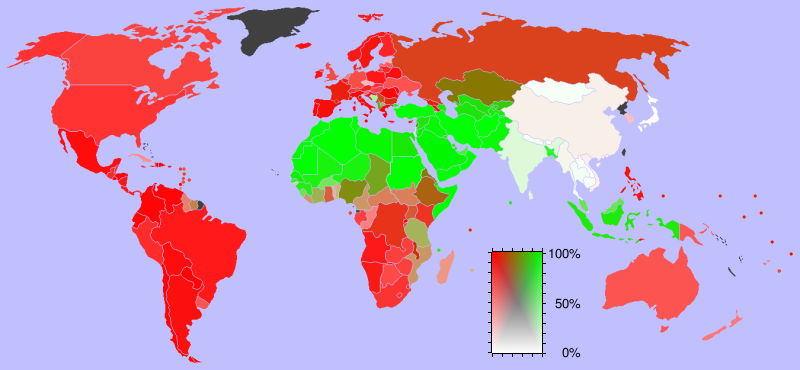
A 2006 map of the relative proportion of Christianity (red) and Islam (green) in each country

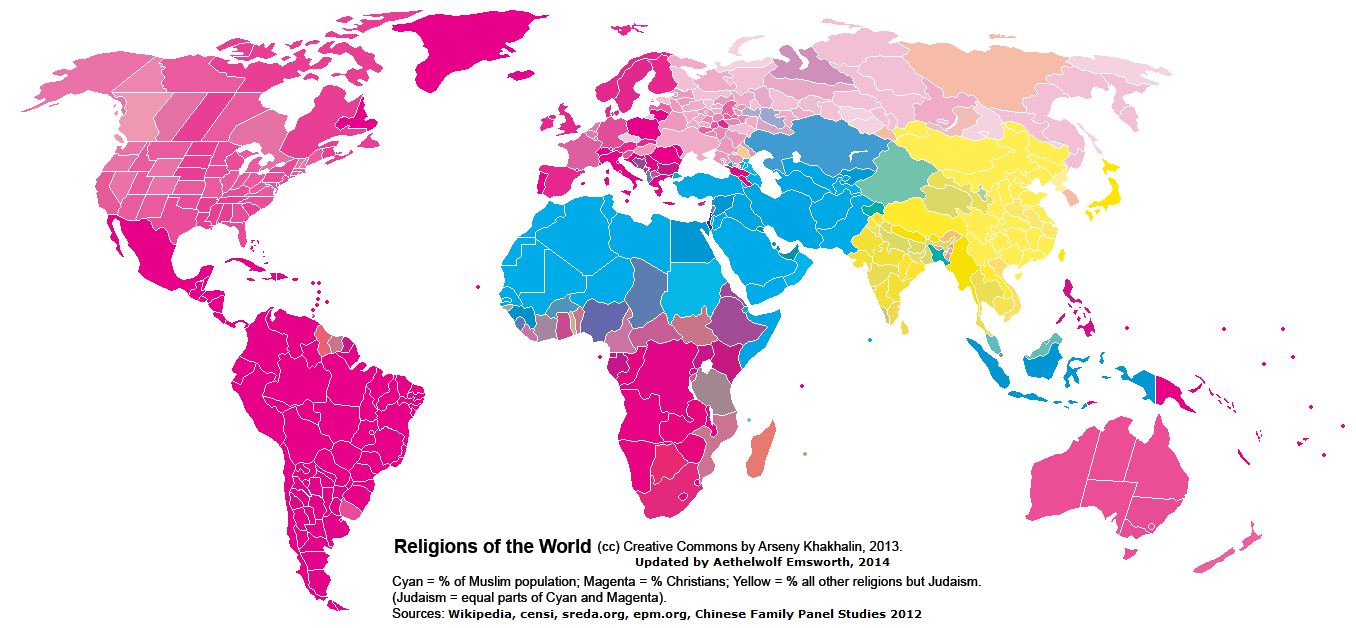
The 2012 distribution of world religions by country/state, and by smaller administrative regions for the largest countries:
% Christian population
% Islam population
% all other religions but Judaism
(equal parts cyan/magenta - Judaism)

== Classification ==
Religious traditions fall into super-groups in comparative religion, arranged by historical origin and mutual influence. Abrahamic religions originate in the Middle East, Indian religions in the Indian subcontinent (South Asia) and East Asian religions in East Asia. Another group with supra-regional influence are Afro-American religion, which have their origins in Central and West Africa. In contemporary scholarship, Modern Paganism is increasingly classified as a distinct supra-regional group, encompassing both eclectic traditions and polytheistic reconstructionism, the latter of which often functions as a contemporary ethnic religion focused on reviving pre-Christian European traditions.

- Middle Eastern religions:
  - Abrahamic religions are the largest group, and these consist mainly of Judaism, Christianity, Islam, and the Baháʼí Faith. They are named for the Hebrew patriarch Abraham, and are unified by the practice of monotheism. Today, at least 3.8 billion people are followers of Abrahamic religions and are spread widely around the world apart from the regions around East and Southeast Asia. Several Abrahamic organizations are vigorous proselytizers. Abrahamic religions with fewer adherents include the Baháʼí Faith, the Druze faith, Samaritanism, and Rastafari.
  - Iranian religions, partly of Indo-European origins, include Zoroastrianism, Yazdânism, Uatsdin, Yarsanism, Manichaeism, and Yazidism.
  - Gnosticism, including historical traditions of Mandaeism, which is still alive in the Middle East and diaspora.
- Eastern religions:
  - Indian religions, originated in Greater India and they tend to share a number of key concepts, such as dharma, karma, reincarnation among others. They are of the most influence across the Indian subcontinent, East Asia, Southeast Asia, as well as isolated parts of Russia. The main Indian religions are Hinduism, Jainism, Buddhism and Sikhism. In 2010 Ravidassia religion was separated from Sikhism.
  - East Asian religions consist of several East Asian religions which make use of the concept of Tao (in Chinese), Đạo (in Vietnamese) or Dō (in Japanese or Korean). They include many Chinese folk religions, Taoism and Confucianism, as well as Vietnamese, Korean and Japanese religions, which are influenced by Chinese religious thought.
- Indigenous ethnic religions, found on every continent, now marginalized by the major organized faiths in many parts of the world or persisting as undercurrents (folk religions) of major religions. Includes traditional African religions, Asian shamanism, Native American religions, Austronesian and Australian Aboriginal traditions, Chinese folk religions, and postwar Shinto. Under more traditional listings, this has been referred to as "paganism" along with historical polytheism.
  - African religions:
    - The religions of the tribal peoples of Sub-Saharan Africa, but excluding ancient Egyptian religion, which is considered to belong to the ancient Middle East;
    - African diasporic religions practiced in the Americas, imported as a result of the Atlantic slave trade of the 16th to 18th centuries, building on traditional religions of Central and West Africa.
- Modern Paganism and Polytheistic reconstructionism is a broad group of religions that seek to revive or recreate pre-Christian spiritualities. Scholars categorize these along a continuum between eclecticism (blending traditions) and reconstructionism (seeking historical and ethnic accuracy).
  - Reconstructionist Roman religion (also known as Religio Romana or Cultus Deorum) is a specific form of ethnic reconstructionism that seeks to re-establish the traditional cults and customs of ancient Rome as a culturally-rooted spiritual framework for the modern era. These movements are often affiliated with the European Congress of Ethnic Religions, emphasizing a "Native Faith" identity tied to European cultural heritage.
- New religious movement is the term applied to any religious faith which has emerged since the 19th century, often syncretizing, re-interpreting or reviving aspects of older traditions such as Ayyavazhi, Mormonism, Ahmadiyya, Jehovah's Witnesses, polytheistic reconstructionism, and so forth.

== History of religious categories ==
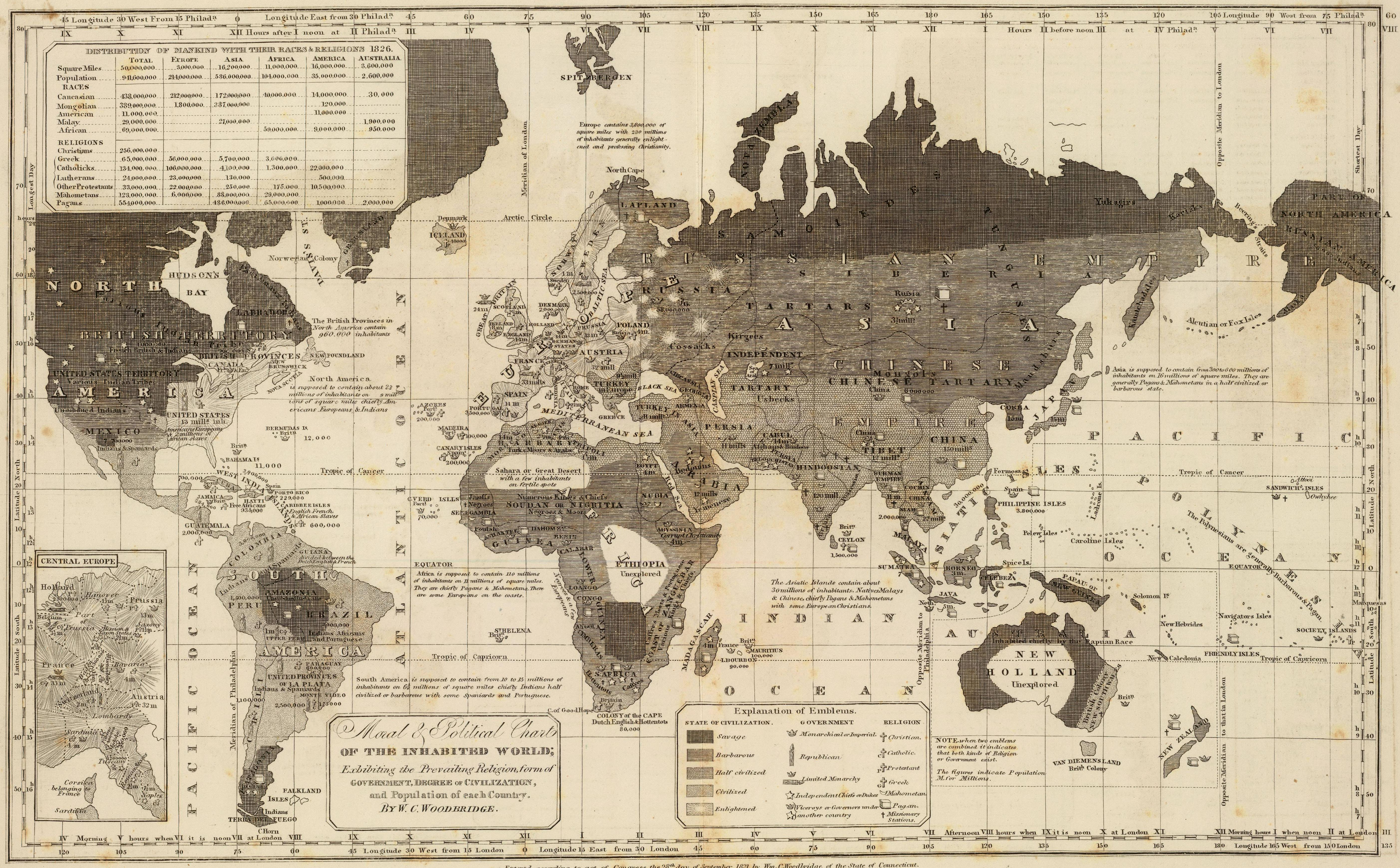
An 1821 map of the world, where "Christians, Mahometans, and Pagans" correspond to levels of civilization. The map makes no distinction between Buddhism and Hinduism.

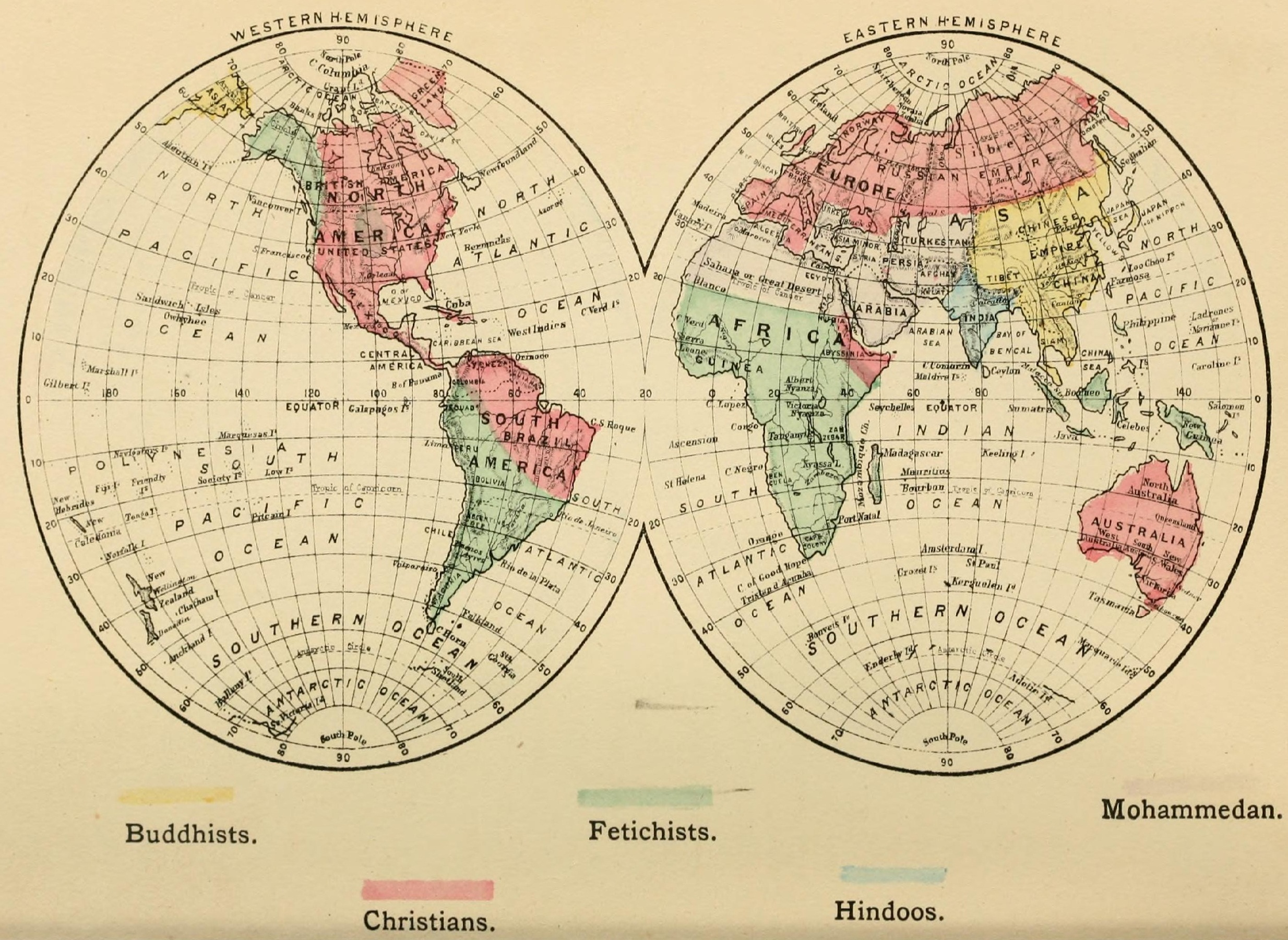
An 1883 map of the world divided into colors representing Christians, Buddhists, Hindus, Mohammedans (Muslims), and Fetishists

=== Christian categorizations ===
Initially, Christians had a simple dichotomy of world beliefs: Christian civility versus foreign heresy or barbarity. In the 18th century, "heresy" was clarified to mean Judaism and Islam; along with paganism, this created a fourfold classification which spawned such works as John Toland's Nazarenus, or Jewish, Gentile, and Mahometan Christianity, which represented the three Abrahamic religions as different "nations" or sects within religion itself, the "true monotheism."

Daniel Defoe described the original definition as follows: "Religion is properly the Worship given to God, but 'tis also applied to the Worship of Idols and false Deities." At the turn of the 19th century, in between 1780 and 1810, the language dramatically changed: instead of "religion" being synonymous with spirituality, authors began using the plural, "religions", to refer to both Christianity and other forms of worship. Therefore, Hannah Adams's early encyclopedia, for example, had its name changed from An Alphabetical Compendium of the Various Sects... to A Dictionary of All Religions and Religious Denominations.

In 1838, the four-way division of Christianity, Judaism, Mahommedanism (archaic terminology for Islam) and paganism was multiplied considerably by Josiah Conder's Analytical and Comparative View of All Religions Now Extant among Mankind. Conder's work still adhered to the four-way classification, but in his eye for detail he puts together much historical work to create something resembling the modern Western image: he includes Druze, Yazidis, Mandaeans, and Elamites under a list of possibly monotheistic groups, and under the final category, of "polytheism and pantheism", he listed Zoroastrianism, "Vedas, Puranas, Tantras, Reformed sects" of India as well as "Brahminical idolatry", Buddhism, Jainism, Sikhism, Lamaism, "religion of China and Japan", and "illiterate superstitions" as others.

The modern meaning of the phrase "world religion", putting non-Christians at the same level as Christians, began with the 1893 Parliament of the World's Religions in Chicago. The Parliament spurred the creation of a dozen privately funded lectures with the intent of informing people of the diversity of religious experience: these lectures funded researchers such as William James, D. T. Suzuki, and Alan Watts, who greatly influenced the public conception of world religions.

In the latter half of the 20th century, the category of "world religion" fell into serious question, especially for drawing parallels between vastly different cultures, and thereby creating an arbitrary separation between the religious and the secular.

=== Islam categorizations ===
In Islam, the Quran mentions three categories: Muslims, the People of the Book, and idol worshipers.

== See also ==
- Irreligion
- List of religions and spiritual traditions
- List of religious populations
- World religions
- Numinous
- Religious conversion
- State religion

== Sources ==
- Anthony, David W. (2007). The Horse, the Wheel and Language: how Bronze-Age riders from the Eurasian Steppes shaped the modern world. Princeton University Press.
- Doniger, Wendy, ed. (2006). Britannica Encyclopedia of World Religions. Encyclopaedia Britannica. ISBN 978-1593392666.
- Samuel, Geoffrey (2010). The Origins of Yoga and Tantra: Indic Religions to the Thirteenth Century. Cambridge University Press.
- Voorst, Robert E. Van (2014). RELG: World (2 ed.). Cengage Learning. ISBN 978-1-285-43468-1.
