= Patternism =

Patternism is a method of comparing the teachings of the religions of the ancient Near East whereby the similarities between these religions are assumed to constitute an overarching pattern. Opponents of this approach have employed the term patternism as a pejorative. While supporters are unified in their belief that the similarities result from the fact that the religions of the ancient near east are related, patternists vary widely in their views about how closely related these religions are and why.
