= Middle Eastern folklore =

Middle Eastern folklore may refer to:

- Arab folklore
- Armenian folklore
- Assyrian/Syriac folklore
- Iranian folklore
- Jewish folklore
- Qatari folklore
- Turkish folklore

== See also ==
- Middle Eastern mythology (disambiguation)
