= Middle Eastern mythology =

Middle East mythology may refer to:

- Ancient Near Eastern mythologies
  - Mesopotamian mythology
  - Egyptian mythology
  - Hittite mythology and religion
- Abrahamic religions
  - Jewish mythology
  - Christian mythology
  - Islamic mythology
- Mythologies of ethnic groups in the Middle East
  - Religion in pre-Islamic Arabia

== See also ==
- Middle Eastern folklore (disambiguation)
- Religion in the Middle East
