= Middle Eastern religions =

Middle Eastern religions are those religions asserted to have originated in or arisen to prevalence within the geography of the Middle East, and are typically distinguished from both Western religions and Eastern religions. The term includes Abrahamic religions, which have been predominant in the region for the best part of a millennium, alongside a range of non-Abrahamic faiths, including those from among the Iranian religions.

The three best-known Abrahamic religions originate from the Middle East: Judaism and Christianity emerged in the Levant in the 6th century BCE and the 1st century CE, respectively, while Islam emerged in Arabia in the 7th century CE. Today, Islam is the region's dominant religion, being adhered to by at least 80% of the population in every Middle Eastern country except for Jewish-majority Israel, religiously diverse Lebanon and Christian-majority Cyprus. Muslims constitute 18% of the total Israeli population, ~67% of the Lebanese population (estimates vary) and 25% of the total Cypriot population, or approximately 2% if Northern Cyprus is excluded from this figure.

There are a number of minority religions present in the Middle East, belonging to the Abrahamic tradition or other religious categories, such as the Iranian religions. These include the Baháʼí Faith, Druzism, Bábism, Yazidism, Gnosticism, Rastafari, Mandaeism, Manichaiesm, Yarsanism, Samaritanism, Ishikism, Ali-Illahism, Yazdânism, Sabianism, Shabakism, and Zoroastrianism. While contemporary Middle Eastern religious practices are overwhelmingly monotheistic, most of the region's ancient traditions were polytheistic, including the Semitic religions and various Iranian religions.

== Historical religions originated in the Middle East ==
=== Islam ===
Islam is the most widely followed religion in the Middle East. About 20% of the world's Muslims live in the Middle East, and about 71.17% percent of people in the Middle East are Muslim. Islam is a monotheistic religion, teaching belief in one God (Allah) and is based on the Quran. Muslims believe that Muhammad is the final prophet of God in a long chain of prophets, from Adam on down to John the Baptist, Jesus, and finally Muhammad. The majority of the Muslims are Sunni, followed by Shi'a. Smaller sects include Ibadism, Sufism, non-denominational, and the Ahmadiyya. Ahmadis are considered by the majority of Muslims as heretical.

A major source of conflict in the Muslim Middle East is the divisive nature between the two main sects of Islam: Sunni and Shi'a. Although these two sects agree on the fundamentals of Islam and the teachings of the Quran, they are in conflict about who would lead the Muslim community after Muhammad's death. The Battle of Siffin and the Battle of Karbala caused a significant schism between the two sects. Throughout the years, differences have arisen between practices, beliefs and culture. Many conflicts between the two communities have occurred.

Country	Total Population	Muslim Percentage	Muslim Population
Bahrain	1,505,003	73.7%	1,109,187
Cyprus	854,800	18.0%	153,864
Egypt	109,546,720	80%	98,592,048
Iran	81,871,500	78%	80,234,070
Iraq	39,339,753	87.0%	38,159,560
Israel	8,930,680	11.7%	1,580,730
Jordan	10,261,300	94.0%	9,645,622
Kuwait	4,420,110	74.6%	3,297,402
Lebanon	6,093,509	45%	3,515,955
Oman	4,664,844	85.9%	4,007,101
Palestine	4,780,978	73.0%	4,446,309
Qatar	2,561,643	67.7%	1,734,232
Saudi Arabia	33,413,660	93.0%	31,000,000
Syria	18,284,407	87.0%	15,907,434
Turkey	80,810,525	99%	74,196,991
United Arab Emirates	9,992,083	76%	7,593,983
Yemen	28,915,284	99.1%	28,655,046
Middle East	419,425,728	91.17%	382,425,728

==== Sunni ====
Sunni Islam is the largest branch of Islam in most countries in the Middle East. According to Sunni traditions, Muhammad left no successor and the participants of the Saqifah event appointed Abu Bakr as the next-in-line (the first caliph).

The Quran, together with hadith (especially those collected in Kutub al-Sittah) and binding juristic consensus, form the basis of all traditional jurisprudence within Sunni Islam. Sharia rulings are derived from these basic sources, in conjunction with analogical reasoning, consideration of public welfare and juristic discretion, using the principles of jurisprudence developed by the traditional legal schools. In matters of creed, the Sunni tradition upholds the six pillars of imān (faith) and comprises the Ash'ari and Maturidi schools of Kalam (theology) as well as the textualist school known as traditionalist theology.

==== Shia ====
Shīʿa Islam or Shīʿīsm is the second-largest branch of Islam. Although there are many Shia subsects, modern Shia Islam has been divided into three main groupings: Twelvers, Ismailis and Zaidis, with Twelvers being the largest and most influential group, making up perhaps 85 percent of Shias. Twelver Shia have their largest populations in the Middle East in Iran (75%), Iraq (45%), Bahrain (35-40%), Azerbaijan (75%), Kuwait (15%), Yemen (30%), Syria (12.5%) Lebanon (20%), Saudi Arabia (8%), Oman (6%), UAE (5%), Turkey (12.5%), and Qatar (5%).

The schism between Shi'as and Sunnis happened after the death of Muhammad. Members of the 'ummah' who later on became representatives of the Shi'ita branch preferred Abu Bakr over Ali ibn Abi Talib, as the successor of the Prophet and as the rightful rulers of the Muslim community. Abu Bakr was appointed caliph by senior Muslims, while Ali ibn Abi Talib was the cousin and son-in-law of Muhammad.

==== Zaydi ====
Followers of the Zaydi Islamic jurisprudence are called Zaydi Shi'a and make up about 30% of Muslims in Yemen. Zaidis emerged in the eighth century out of Shi'a Islam. They are named after Zayd ibn ʻAlī, the grandson of Husayn ibn ʻAlī who they recognize as the fifth Imam.

==== Alawites ====
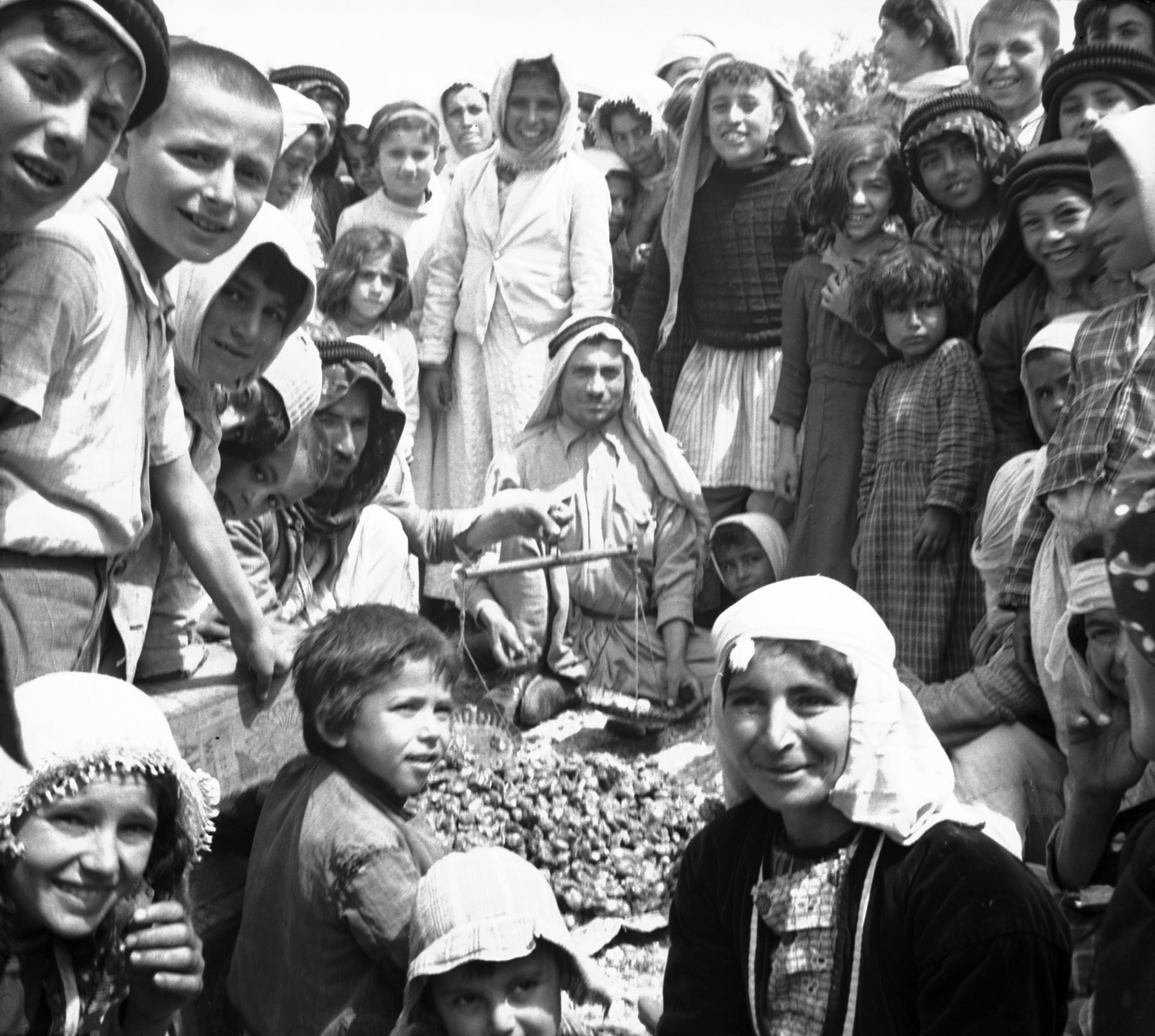
Alawites celebrating at a festival in Baniyas, Syria during World War II.

Alawis, also rendered as Alawites, Alawīyyah or Nusạyriyya, is a syncretic sect of the Twelver branch of Shia Islam, primarily centered in Syria. The eponymously named Alawites revere Ali (Ali ibn Abi Talib), considered the 1st Imam of the Twelver school. However, they are generally considered to be Ghulat by most other sects of Shia Islam. The sect is believed to have been founded by Ibn Nusayr during the 9th century, and fully established as a religion. For this reason, Alawites are sometimes called Nusayris (Arabic: نصيرية Nuṣayrīyyah), although the term has come to be used as a pejorative in the modern era. Another name, Ansari (Arabic: انصارية Anṣāriyyah), is believed to be a mistransliteration of Nusayri. Today, Alawites represent 11 percent of the Syrian population and are a significant minority in Turkey and northern Lebanon. There is also a population living in the village of Ghajar in the Golan Heights. They are often confused with the Alevis of Turkey. Alawites form the dominant religious group on the Syrian coast and towns near the coast which is also inhabited by Sunnis, Christians, and Ismailis.

Alawites have historically kept their beliefs secret from outsiders and non-initiated Alawites. At the core of Alawite belief is a divine triad, comprising three aspects of the one God.

Alawites have traditionally lived in the An-Nusayriyah Mountains along the Mediterranean coast of Syria. Latakia and Tartus are the region's principal cities. They are also concentrated in the plains around Hama and Homs. Alawites also live in Syria's major cities, and are estimated at 12 percent of the country's population (2.6 million, out of a total population of 22 million).

==== Alevism ====
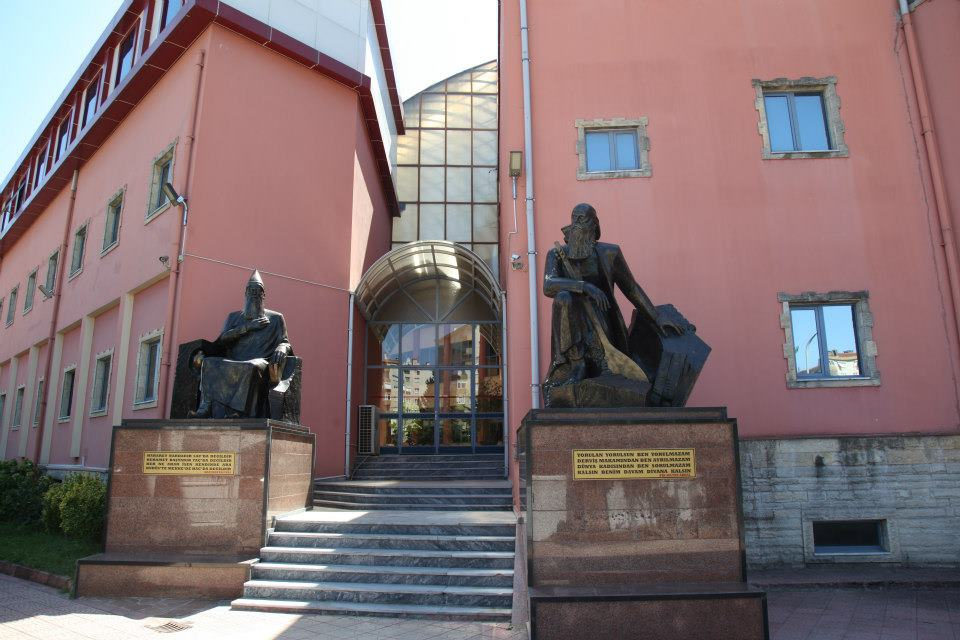
Kartal Cemevi in Istanbul.

Alevism is a small syncretic, heterodox form of Islam, following Shia, Sufi, Sunni and local traditions, whose adherents follow the mystical (bāṭenī) teachings of Ali, the Twelve Imams, and a descendant—the 13th century Alevi saint Haji Bektash Veli. There are between 8–12 million Alevi and they are found primarily in Turkey among ethnic Turks and Kurds, and make up between 10 and 15% of Turkey's population, the largest branches of Islam there after the majority Sunni Islam.

Some of the differences that mark Alevis from mainstream Muslims are the use of cemevi halls rather than mosques; worship ceremonies that feature wine, music and dancing, and where both women and men participate. And non-observance of the five daily salat prayers and prostrations (they only bow twice in the presence of their spiritual leader), Ramadan, and the Hajj (considering true pilgrimage to be an internal one). Alevis have some links with Twelver Shia Islam (such as importance of the Ahl al-Bayt, the day of Ashura, the Mourning of Muharram, commemorating Karbala), but do not follow taqlid towards a Marja' "source of emulation". Some practices of the Alevis are based on Sufi elements of the Bektashi tariqa.

=== Christianity ===
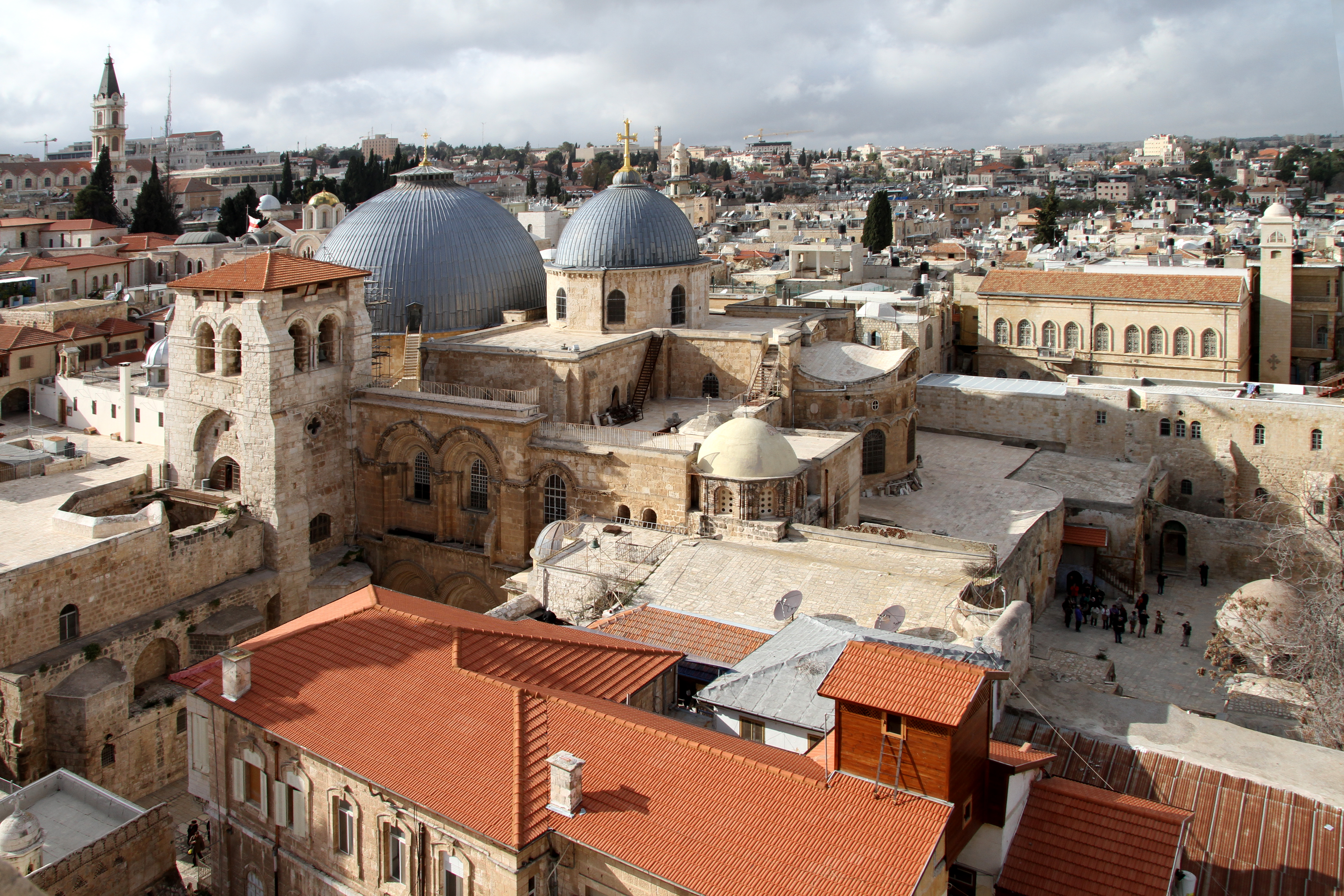
Church of the Holy Sepulchre

Christianity originated in the region in the 1st century AD, and was one of the major religions of the region until the Muslim conquests of the mid-to-late 7th century AD. Christianity in the Middle East is characterized by its diverse beliefs and traditions compared to other parts of the old world.

Christian communities have played a vital role in the Middle East. Scholars and intellectuals agree Christians in the Middle East have made significant contributions to Arab and Islamic civilization since the introduction of Islam, and they have had a significant impact contributing to the culture of the Mashriq, Turkey, and Iran.

Christians now make up 5% of the population, down from 20% in the early 20th century. The number of Middle Eastern Christians is dropping in some regions in the Middle East due to such factors as extensive emigration. Political turmoil, persecution by extreme Islamists and declining birth rates contribute to driving indigenous Near Eastern Christians of various ethnicities towards seeking security and stability outside their homelands.

Presently, the only Christian majority country in the Middle East is Cyprus.

==== Copts ====
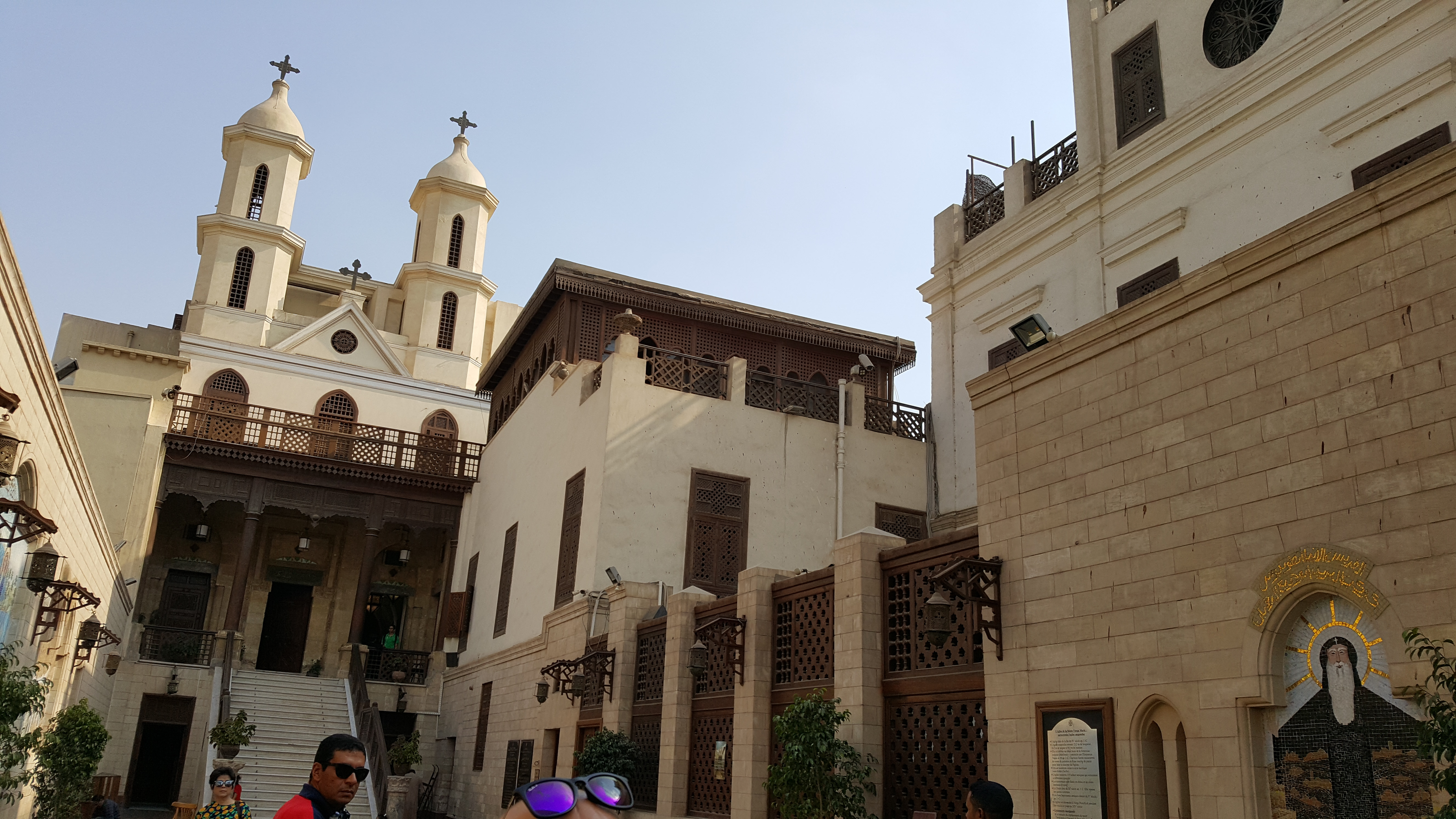
Hanging Church

The largest Christian group in the Middle East is the originally Coptic-speaking, but now Arabic-speaking Coptic Orthodox Christian population. This Egyptian ethnoreligious community of Copts, is cited by the official census as consisting of 4 million people in 2008. although Coptic sources cite the figure as being closer to 15–20 million. Copts reside mainly in Egypt, but also in Sudan and Libya, with tiny communities in Israel, Cyprus and Jordan.

In Egypt, Copts are better educated, wealthier and have a stronger representation in white collar job types than the general population, but limited representation in security agencies. The majority of demographic, socioeconomic and health indicators are similar among Copts and Muslims. Historically; many Copts were accountants, and in 1961 Coptic Christians owned 51% of the Egyptian banks. According to the scholar Andrea Rugh, Copts tend to belong to the educated middle and upper-middle class, and according to scholar Lois Farag "The Copts still played the major role in managing Egypt's state finances. They held 20% of total state capital, 45% of government employment, and 45% of government salaries".

==== Maronites ====
Arabic-speaking Maronites count 1.1–1.2 million across the Middle East and most of them are concentrated in Lebanon, with minorities in Syria, Israel and Cyprus. In Lebanon, under the terms of an informal agreement, known as the National Pact, between the various political and religious communities, the president of the country must be a Maronite Christian.

==== Assyrians ====
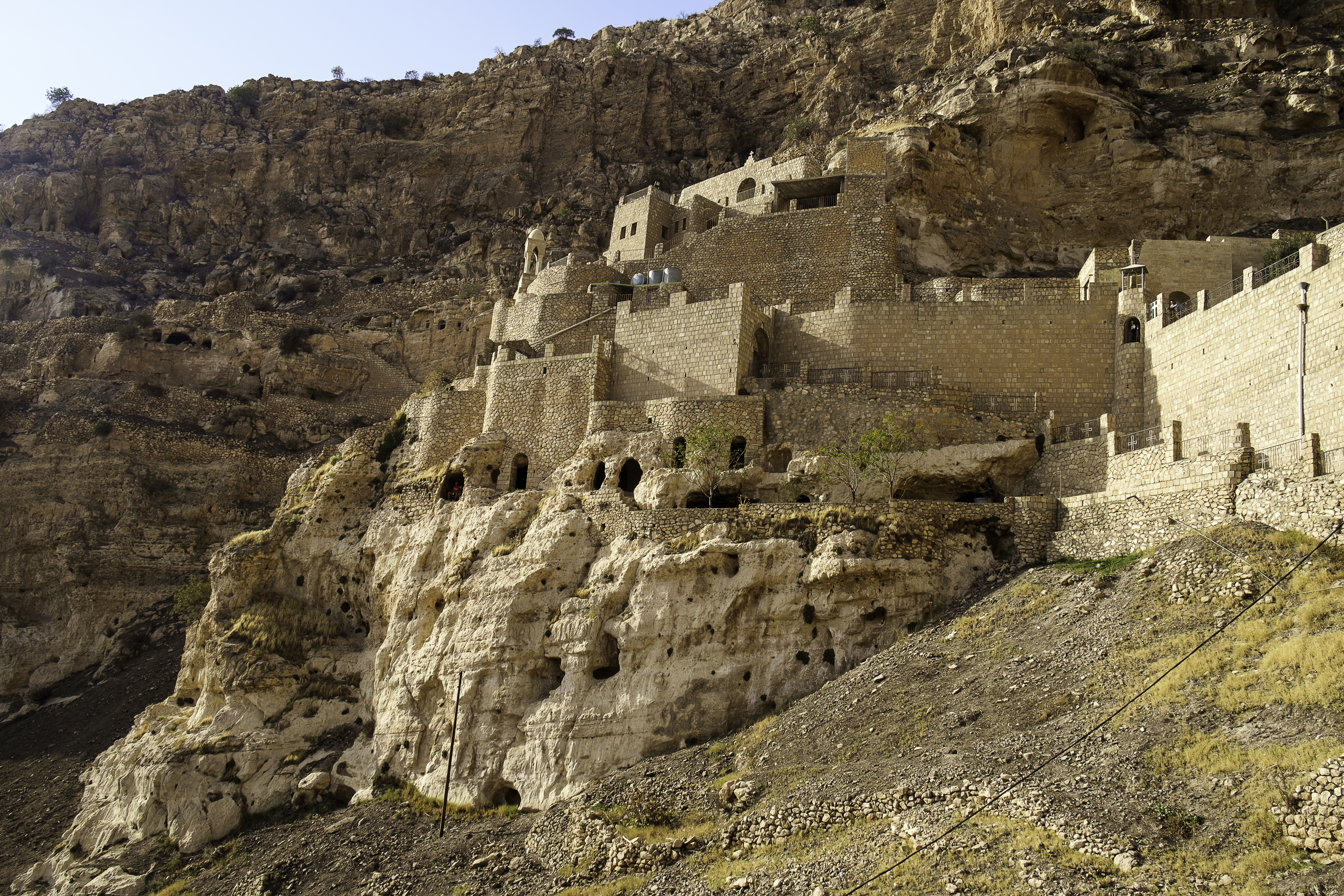
Rabban Hormizd Monastery

Assyrians are an Eastern Aramaic speaking people indigenous to Iraq, southeastern Turkey, northwestern Iran and northeastern Syria. They have suffered both ethnic and religious persecution over the last few centuries such as the Assyrian genocide and the Simele massacre, leading to many fleeing to the West or congregating in areas in other parts of the Middle East. In Iraq, the number of indigenous Assyrians has declined to around 140,000 out of a total population of 46 million.

Currently, the largest community of Syriac Christians in the Middle East resides in Syria, numbering 877,000–1,139,000. These are a mix of Neo-Aramaic speaking Assyrians and other Arabic-speaking Christian groups, as well as the Arameans of Maaloula and Jubb'adin (original speakers of the almost extinct Western Neo-Aramaic dialect).

==== Armenians ====
In the Middle Eastern countries, there is a sizeable community of Armenians. The Armenians in the Middle East number around 350,000–400,000 and are mostly concentrated in Iran, Lebanon, Cyprus, Syria, Jordan, and Palestine, although well-established communities exist in Iraq, Egypt, and Turkey. The number of Armenians in Turkey is disputed – having a wide range of estimations. Small Armenian communities are in Iraq and Israel. Some other sources claim that the Armenians number around half a million, with their largest community in Iran including 200,000 – 300,000 members. The Armenian genocide during and after World War I drastically reduced the once sizeable Armenian population.

==== Other Christian groups ====
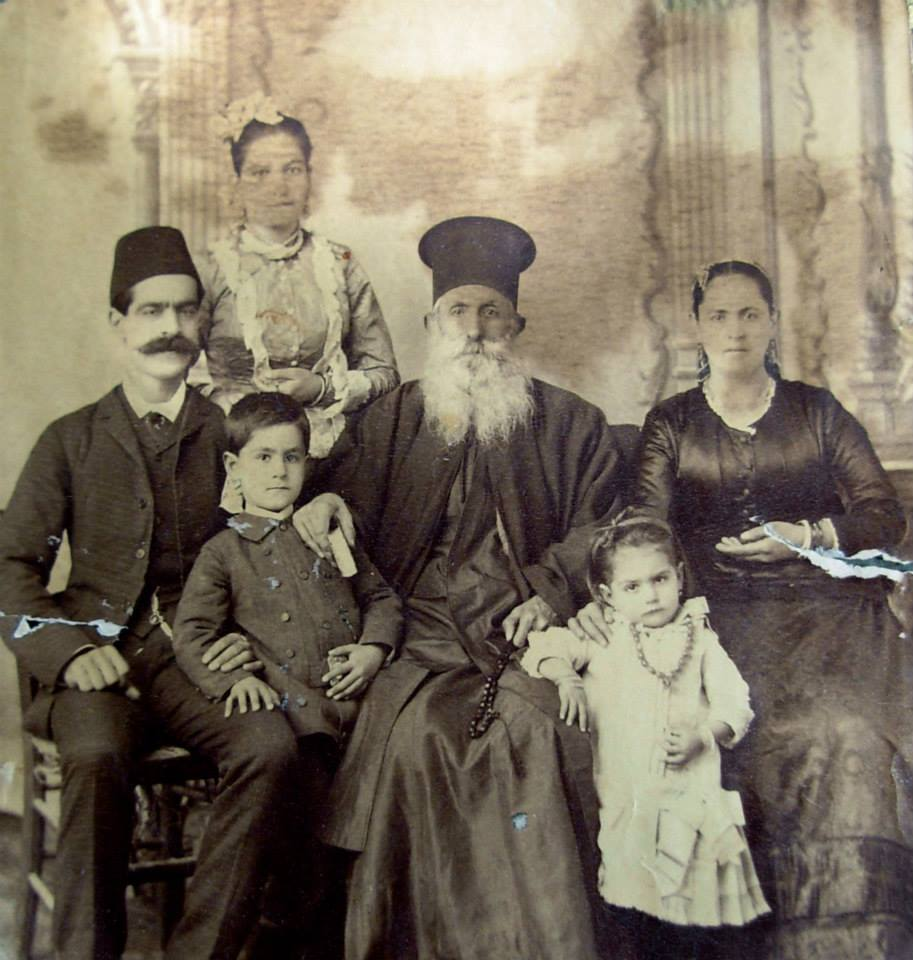
Married Eastern Orthodox priest from Jerusalem with his family (three generations), circa 1893

In the Persian Gulf states, Bahrain has 1,000 Christian citizens. Kuwait has 400 native Christian citizens, and 450,000 Christian foreign residents. Arab Christians, and those who tend to identify as Arabs, are mostly adherents of the Greek Orthodox Church. In 2010 they numbered 1.1 million in Syria, 350,000 in Lebanon, 250–300,000 in Jordan, 150,000 in Israel and Palestine and smaller numbers in Turkey (18,000) and Iraq. Protestant converts number around 400,000. Melkite Catholics, who are Eastern Catholics of the Greek Rite, comprise almost 600,000. Syrian Orthodox number about 1 million in Syria, Iraq, Turkey, Jordan and Lebanon, with the great majority being in Syria.

The ethnic Greeks, who had once inhabited large parts of the western Middle East and Asia Minor, have declined since the Arab conquests and recently severely reduced in Turkey, as a result of the Greek genocide and Greco-Turkish War, which followed World War I. Today the biggest Middle Eastern Greek community resides in Cyprus numbering around 793,000 (2008). Cypriot Greeks constitute the only Christian majority state in the Middle East, although Lebanon was founded with a Christian majority in the first half of the 20th century.

Smaller Christian groups include; Georgians, Messianic Jews, Russians. A small number of converts exist in the Kurdish, Turcoman, Iranian, Shabak, Azeri, Circassian and Arab communities. There are currently several million Christian foreign workers in the Gulf area, mostly from the Philippines, India, Sri Lanka and Indonesia. Middle Eastern Christians are relatively wealthy, well educated, and politically moderate, and have an active role in various social, economical, sporting and political aspects in the Middle East.

=== Judaism ===
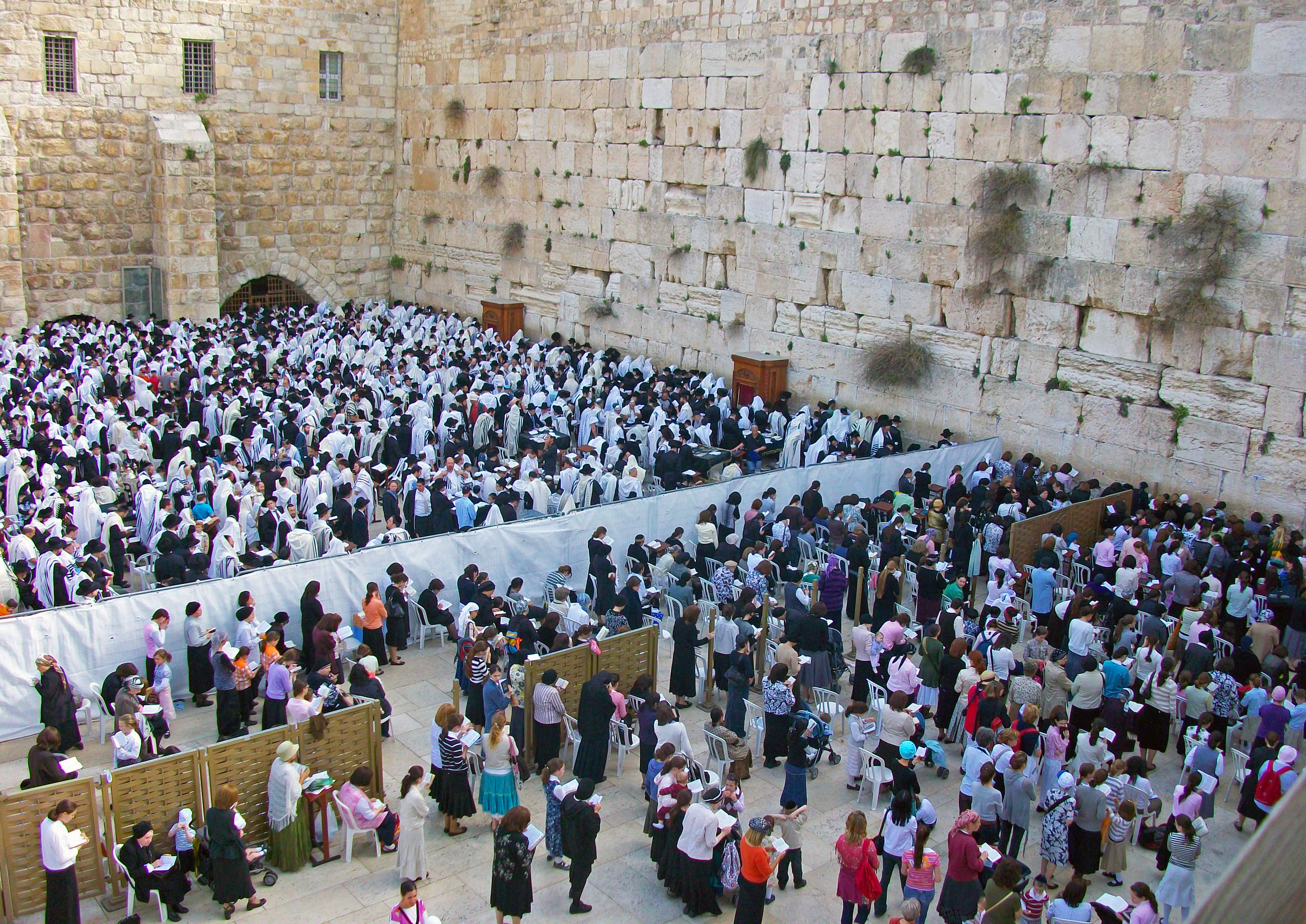
Western Wall

Judaism is a religion originated in the region of Palestine. Middle Eastern Jews are colloquially known as Mizrahi Jews. They include descendants of Babylonian Jews and Mountain Jews from modern Iraq, Morocco, Egypt, Libya, Tunisia, Algeria, Syria, Bahrain, Kuwait, Iran, Uzbekistan, the Caucasus, Kurdistan, Afghanistan, India, Pakistan, and Yemen. Since the 1950s because of growing anti-semitism, most of these Jews fled to Israel where they make up the majority of Israel's Jewish population and roughly a third of total world Jews. While they no longer live among a Muslim majority, they continue to follow many customs with strong Muslim and Middle Eastern influences making them distinct from European Jews. Today Judaism in the Middle East is mostly practiced in Israel. Israel's population is 75.3% Jewish, with the remainder made up of Muslims (20.6%), Christians, Druze, Baháʼí and various other minorities (4.1%). There are few other countries in the Middle East with significant Jewish populations, but the communities are small and scattered.

=== Druzism ===
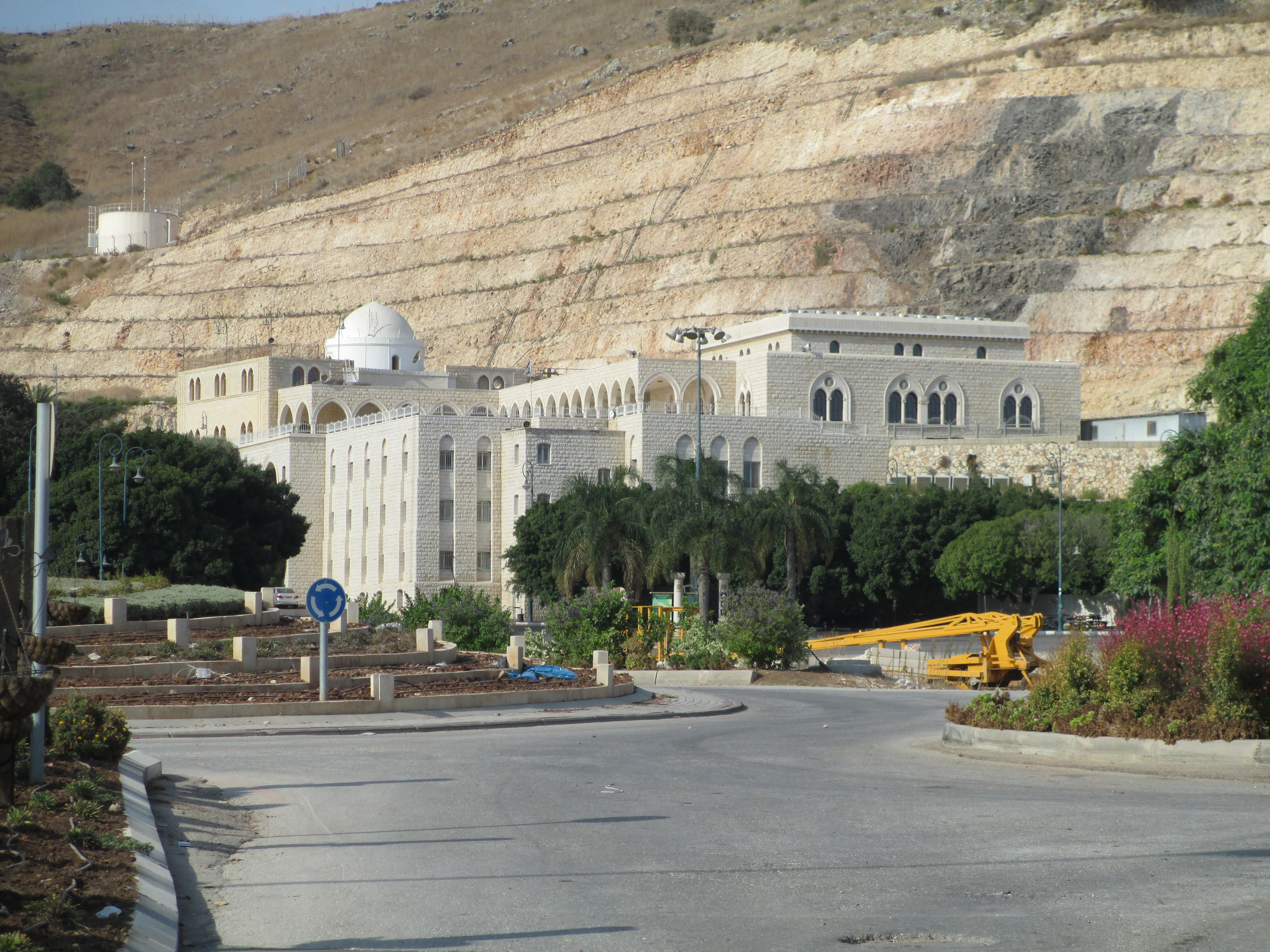
The complex hosting the tomb of Nabi Shu'ayb, Israel

The Druze faith is one of the major religious groups in the Levant, with between 800,000 and a million adherents. They are primarily located in Lebanon, Syria, and Israel, with smaller communities in Jordan. They make up 5.5% of Lebanon's population, 3% of Syria and 1.6% of Israel. The oldest and most densely populated Druze communities exist in Mount Lebanon and in the south of Syria around Jabal al-Druze (literally the "Mountain of the Druze"). Although the Druze faith developed from Isma'ilism, Druze do not identify as Muslims. Arabic language and culture are integral parts of their identity, with Arabic being their primary language. Although it developed from Isma'ilite teachings, the Druze faith also incorporates Jewish, Christian, Gnostic, Neoplatonic and Iranian elements.

According to scholar Colbert C. Held of the University of Nebraska–Lincoln the number of Druze people worldwide is around one million, with about 45% to 50% in Syria, 35% to 40% in Lebanon, and less than 10% in Israel. Recently there has been a growing Druze diaspora. Representation ranges from 100,000 in Israel to 700,000 in Syria.

=== Samaritanism ===
Samaritanism is a closely affiliated religion with Judaism, practiced by the ethnoreligious Samaritan community. In the past, the group used to be present in Egypt and Syria as well, but their community had almost collapsed by the late 19th century. Their population mainly reside in the area of Mount Gerizim, near the city of Nablus. Today the Samaritan community has grown to about 850 persons from as few as 150 in the early 20th century.

Samaritanism has a shared history and many shared customs with Judaism, and the main difference is the position of Mount Gerizim in their belief system. In their views not Jerusalem, but Mount Gerizim is regarded as the utmost sacred place chosen by God, where Joshua's alter was and where stones of Law emerged. Additionally, because of the many similarities, debates emerged regarding the question of Samaritanism being a Jewish sect or an independent religion.

Samaritans are mainly Arabic-speakers, however they use a separate script deriving from Hebrew-Canaanite for their biblical and historical scripts. Their holy script is called the Samaritan Pentateuch, that is believed to be the unaltered version of the Jewish script, the Torah.

=== Mandaeism ===
Mandaeism, sometimes also known as Sabianism (after the mysterious Sabians mentioned in the Quran, a name historically claimed by several religious groups), is a Gnostic and monotheistic religion. There are between 60,000 and 70,000 Mandaeans worldwide and in the Middle East, they are found in Iraq and Iran. They revere Adam, Abel, Seth, Enos, Noah, Shem, Aram, and especially John the Baptist. Mandaeans are a closed ethnoreligious group.

=== Yazidism ===
Yazidis (Yezidi, Ezidi or Ezdi) are an ethno religious group in Iraq, Syria and Turkey, in more recent times, they've also established communities in Russia, Georgia and Armenia after fleeing persecution from the Sunnis during Ottoman era. They follow a monotheistic ethnic religion that has roots in a western branch of an Iranic pre-Zoroastrian religion. Their religion is based on the belief of one God who created the world and entrusted it into the care of seven Holy Beings. The leader of these Angels is Tawûsê Melek, who is symbolized with a peacock. Published estimates of the Yazidi population vary greatly; from 300,000 worldwide to 700,000 in Northern Iraq alone, according to a recent estimate by U.S State Department, 500,000-700,000 Yazidis reside in Iraq today. Yazidis of Iraq live in Sinjar Mountains, districts of Shekhan, Zakho and Simele in Duhok, and Tel Kaif district and Bashiqa in Nineveh governorate.

=== Zoroastrianism ===
In the Middle East, Zoroastrianism is found in central Iran. Today, there are estimated to be under 20,000 Zoroastrians in Iran. It is one of the oldest monotheistic religions as it was founded 3500 years ago. It was also one of the most powerful religions in the world for about 1000 years, during the Persian pre-Islamic dynasties. Now, however, it is considered one of the smallest religions with only 190,000 followers worldwide. There is a supreme deity called Ahura Mazda; lord of wisdom, symbolised as light of sun and fire. There is a dualistic principal of Spenta Mainyu; creative mind or goodness and Angra Mainyu; destructive mind or evil, this is known in Middle Persian as Ahriman. It is ultimately up to the individual to decide which the two paths they choose to follow. Zoroastrians follow the Avesta which is their primary sacred text.

== New religious movements originated in the Middle East ==
=== Bábism ===
Babism or the Bab Faith originated in Iran in the middle of the 19th century. The religion developed in the context of Shia Islam, where a merchant declared himself to be the prophesied 12th imam, and took the title of Bab However throughout his ministry his titles and claims underwent much evolution as the Báb progressively outlined his teachings. The Bab's claims led to public unrest and ultimately the execution of the Bab by the Iranian government.

The Bábí movement signaled a break with Shia Islam, beginning a new religious system with its own unique laws, teachings, and practices. Babism is a monotheistic religion which professes that there is one incorporeal, unknown, and incomprehensible God who manifests his will in an unending series of theophanies, called Manifestation of God.

While Bábism was violently opposed by both clerical and government establishments, it led to the founding of the Baháʼí Faith, whose followers consider the religion founded by the Báb as a predecessor to their own.

According to one scholar there are currently no more than a few thousand adherents of the Babi Faith.

==== Baháʼí Faith ====
The Baháʼí Faith is a relatively new religion teaching the essential worth of all religions and the unity of all people. Established by Baháʼu'lláh in the 19th century, it initially developed in Iran and parts of the Middle East, where it has faced ongoing persecution since its inception.

According to the Baháʼí teachings, religion is revealed in an orderly and progressive way by a single God through Manifestations of God, who are the founders of major world religions throughout history; Buddha, Jesus, and Muhammad are noted as the most recent of these before the Báb and Baháʼu'lláh. Baháʼís regard the major religions as fundamentally unified in purpose, though varied in social practices and interpretations. The Baháʼí Faith stresses the unity of all people, explicitly rejecting racism, sexism and nationalism. At the heart of Baháʼí teachings is the goal of a unified world order that ensures the prosperity of all nations, races, creeds, and classes.

The Baháʼí Faith has noteworthy representation in Iran, Yemen, United Arab Emirates, Palestine, Israel, and Turkey. Its international headquarters are located on the northern slope of Mount Carmel at Haifa, Israel. Founded in Iran in 1863, the Baháʼí Faith has an estimated 7 to 8 million followers across the world.

== Foreign religions practiced in the Middle East ==
=== Hinduism ===
Hinduism's presence in the Middle East emerged through trade, migration, and labor movements, not indigenous religious tradition. Scholarship views Hinduism in the Middle East as part of the wider South Asian diaspora, shaped by mercantile networks and mass labor migration. However, a form of ancient Vedic Hinduism was present in ancient Persia before Zoroastrianism became the dominant religion.

With this migration, Hindu temples have been built in Bahrain, the United Arab Emirates, Yemen, and Oman.

=== Buddhism ===
It is estimated that in the Middle East around 900,000 people, perhaps more, profess Buddhism as their religion. Buddhist adherents make up just over 0.3% of the total population of the Middle East.

Although Buddhism has had a presence in the Middle East for over 1000 years, it has recently experienced a revival with an estimated 900,000 people (perhaps more) who profess Buddhism as their religion. Buddhist adherents make up just over 0.3% of the total population of the Middle East. Many of these Buddhists are workers who have migrated from other parts of Asia to the Middle East in the last 20 years, many from countries and regions that have large Buddhist populations, such as China, Vietnam, Japan, Thailand, Sri Lanka, Nepal and Bhutan. A small number of engineers, company directors, and managers from Japan, Taiwan, Hong Kong, Singapore, and South Korea have also moved to the Middle East.

=== Sikhism ===
Sikhism, a monotheistic Indian religion, developed from the spiritual teachings of Guru Nanak (1469–1539), the faith's first guru, and the nine Sikh gurus who succeeded him. The tenth guru, Gobind Singh (1666–1708), named the Sikh scripture Guru Granth Sahib as his successor, bringing to a close the line of human gurus and establishing the scripture as the 11th and last eternally living guru, a religious spiritual/life guide for Sikhs.

The core beliefs of Sikhism, articulated in the Guru Granth Sahib, include faith and meditation in the name of the one creator; divine unity and equality of all humankind; engaging in seva ('selfless service'); striving for justice for the benefit and prosperity of all; and honest conduct and livelihood while living a householder's life. Following this standard, Sikhism rejects claims that any particular religious tradition has a monopoly on Absolute Truth.

Sikhism, the fifth-largest organized religion in the world after Christianity, Islam, Hinduism, and Buddhism, having over 25 million Sikhs worldwide, has a small presence in the Middle East too, mainly in the United Arab Emirates, Oman, Bahrain, Kuwait, and Iran. Most of them are Punjabi-speaking Indian expatriates.

== Irreligion ==
According to a 2012 WIN-Gallup International 'Religiosity and Atheism Index', atheists are a small minority in the Middle East with only 2% of those surveyed in the Arab world identifying themselves as "committed atheists". Dar al-Ifta al-Misriyyah, the branch of the Egyptian government that issues fatawa (religious edicts), gives lower (if less reliable) numbers, stating that there are 866 atheists in Egypt – "roughly 0.001% of the population"—325 in Morocco, and 32 in Yemen (defined as not only unbelievers, but secularists and "Muslims who convert to other religions").

Some countries (Iraq, Tunisia) surveyed had 0% of respondents identifying as atheists. Other countries indicated low percentages (Palestine 1% and Turkey 2%). a lower percentage compared to other places like in Europe, Africa, Latin America, or South Asia.

According to unbelievers in the Arab world, their numbers are growing but they suffer from persecution. Author and historian Faisal Devji notes that although Saudi Arabia punishes unbelief with death, 5% of those surveyed identified themselves as atheists. Devji states there is "a new movement of atheists in countries such as Saudi Arabia ... which takes the form of secret societies", meeting "in internet chat rooms and unnamed physical locations, like the mystics of old".

In Egypt, Al Jazeera reported a clandestine atheist group of over 100 in Alexandria in 2013. The group complained of mistreatment of atheists by society and government. A Pew survey found 63% of Egyptian Muslims favored the death penalty for those who leave the religion of Islam. The Egyptian penal code punishes "contempt of heavenly religions", and as of 2013 Egyptians had been arrested and/or imprisoned for activities such as setting up a Facebook page calling for atheism, writing a book entitled Where is God?, and "defamation of religion".

== Countries ==
=== Egypt ===
Religion in Egypt consists of Islam (mostly Sunni Muslim) 80–90%, Coptic Christians 10–20% and other Christians 1%. As Egypt has modernized with new forms of media and the Egyptian press was liberalized in the 2000s, Coptic Christianity has become a main topic of religious controversy. There is a degree of tension between the Muslims and Copts of Egypt as Copts argue for more representation in government and less legal and administrative discrimination. With this greater freedom of press, the Coptic issue has just begun to break into public awareness, but also due to a minority within both religious communities having extremist views, the media may also be exacerbating the sectarian tension by only publicizing examples of prejudice.

Another current religious tension in Egypt is the role of the Muslim Brotherhood, founded by Hassan al-Banna in Egypt. The movement has expanded, with active branches in many countries. Many are violent and most Arab governments actively try to restrain the group by arresting and killing members. Currently, as the new government of Egypt is trying to establish itself, many are concerned that a member of the Muslim Brotherhood will again step in and claim leadership. For the current candidates for the presidency, more than one is likely to be affiliated with the Muslim Brotherhood.

The Brotherhood is however unpopular among the majority of Egyptians on account of its fundamentalist views, its clampdown on tourism and its desire to impose Sharia law on the nation.

=== Iran ===
Religion in Iran is made up of 98% Islam (Shi'a 89%, Sunni 9%) and 2% Zoroastrian, Jewish, Christian, and Baháʼí. There was much religious oppression and executions of members of the Baháʼí Faith. Religious minorities are now beginning to hold a larger presence and significance in Iran and are being acknowledged as such.

The Islamic Revolution replaced an old-world monarchy with a theocracy based on the Guardianship of the Islamic Jurist (Velayat-e Faqih) where a Shia cleric (faqih) is the ruler, though there are also competitive elections of candidates approved by another clerical body. This is a mix of republicanism and religion where that would use religion to rule for elective and democratic institutions; it was to be a blend of liberalism and religious injunctions (abs). Islam would be protected under this Islamic Republic and unelected positions like the Supreme Leader and the Guardian Council would have unlimited power over the nation. With the nuclear program developing in Iran and much conflict after September 11, 2001, Iran and the Islamic Republic are at a crossroads.

=== Iraq ===
Religion in Iraq is represented by 97% Islam (Shiite 60%–65%, Sunni 32%–37%), and 3% Christian or other. Because of this large majority of Shia over Sunni Muslim, there is much tension between the two groups.

=== Israel ===
Religion in Israel is represented by the following religious make-up: Judaism 77%, Islam 16%, Christian 2%, Druze 2% (2003). As of 2013, the Israeli "Government - Christians Forum" was formed under the umbrella of the Ministry of Public Security, by Dr. Mordehcai Zaken, head of the Minorities Affairs Desk, to address and promote the concerns of Christian leaders and representative in their interactions with the State. Israel represents the religious Holy Land for Jews, Christians, Muslims, and Baha'is. All religions are present in Israel and lay personal claim to the land. Due to the significant Israeli/Palestinian conflict, tensions are high in the religious community. The majority of displaced and Palestinians are Muslim and the majority of current Israeli citizens are Jewish so establishing the state borders is highly influenced by religion.

One of the main difficulties in establishing peace between the two countries is because of Jerusalem. Each of the three main religions is incredibly attached to this city and claim it as their own. Therefore, it is difficult to determine whether Palestine or Israel will encompass this region. Maps produced within the territories represent Jerusalem differently. Palestinian maps draw Jerusalem as divided and Israeli maps show it as a part of Israeli territory.

=== Jordan ===
Religion in Jordan is represented by 92% Muslim (Sunni), 6% Christian (mostly Greek Orthodox), and 2% other.

=== Lebanon ===
Saint George Maronite Cathedral and the Mohammad Al-Amin Mosque, Beirut. 41% in Lebanon is Christians representing the mosaic of the Middle East, and contributing heavily in the Media, Politics, Entertainment, Banking... sectors in Lebanon and the World.

Religion in Lebanon is the most varied in the Middle East. Lebanon's population has a vast mix of faiths, represented by 54% Muslim (Shi'a, Sunni, Isma'ilite, Alawite/Nusayri), 41% Christian (Maronite, Greek Orthodox, Melkite, and Christian churches non-native to Lebanon like Armenian Apostolic Church, Armenian Catholic Church, Chaldean Catholic Church, Roman Catholic Church, Assyrian Church of the East, Armenian Evangelical Church, Coptic Orthodox Church of Alexandria, Protestant), while the rest 5% of Lebanon belongs to the Druze faith. Lebanon has a confessional political system in which, regardless of political parties, the President is always Maronite Christian, the Prime Minister a Sunni Muslim, and the Speaker of the Parliament a Shi'ite Muslim, and the Deputy Prime Minister Greek Orthodox Christian. Also, the Army General has to be Christian and the Bank Governor has to be always Christian as well. In addition, 50% of the Parliament is represented by Christian Members, according to the law in Lebanon since the end of the war until today. This is the foundation of uniqueness of Lebanon and the source of much of its conflicts; and while changes have been made to attempt to make parliamentary representation more even, many are still urging for reform and change. Some would like the confessionalist government to be abolished.

=== Saudi Arabia ===
Religion in Saudi Arabia is allegedly 100% Muslim. It is illegal to practice any other religion than Islam in Saudi Arabia. There is still tension, however, between the Sunnis and the Shias. Shiite Islamist revolution has never been a huge threat to the Saudi Arabian government, though, because it is such a small population. Sunni Islamists, though, present a larger threat to the government because of their large Saudi Arabian population. These Sunni groups often dissent through violence targeted at government, Western or non-Muslims that threat the Muslim nation, Shiites, and sometimes generally directed against moral corruption.

=== Syria ===
Religion in Syria is represented by 70% Islam (Sunni), 12% Alawite, 5% Druze, and other Islamic sects, 10% Christian (various sects), and there is some Jewish representation (tiny communities in Damascus, Al Qamishli, and Aleppo).

=== Turkey ===
Religion in Turkey is represented by 92% Muslim (with 88% Sunni and 4% Alevi), with 6% having no religion. Originally a militarily secularized government, under the president Erdogan, religious freedom for Muslims has become much more accessible in Turkey. There has been a growing religious resurgence in Turkey and more and more citizens find significance in their religious identities. The previous laws disallowing the Hijab, religious headscarf, in schools and public places has been a huge source of contention. Now, it is a matter of civil rights in courts. The case of Sahin 2004 was one that exemplified the tension between religious secularism, civil rights and the government's power in Turkey. The case revolved around a student at university being allowed to wear the Hijab in class. Religious education is also a topic of debate in Turkey. Before 1980, private religious education was banned and then it was changed to be required. As it is currently being reevaluated, the question is whether religious education should be banned again, optional or if it should be obligatory and plural.

=== Yemen ===
Religion in Yemen is represented by a majority of Islam (including Sunni and Shiite), small numbers of native Jewish communities, Baháʼí, Christian, and Hindu. Followers of the Zaydi Islamic jurisprudence are called Zaydi Shi'a and make up about 35% of Muslims in Yemen.

== See also ==
- Middle Eastern mythology
- Religions of the ancient Near East
