= A Dictionary of All Religions and Religious Denominations =

1817 book by Hannah Adams

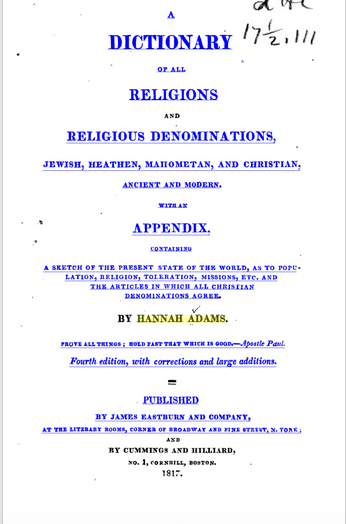
- Author: Hannah Adams
- Original title: A Dictionary of All Religions and Religious Denominations
- Language: English
- Subject: Religion
- Published: 1817
- Publisher: James Eastburn & Co., Cummings & Hilliard
- Publication place: United States
- Pages: 376
- OCLC: 1100145376

A Dictionary of All Religions and Religious Denominations is a 19th-century comprehensive survey of world religions by the American author, Hannah Adams. It was first published in Boston, Massachusetts in 1817.

In 1817, appeared A Dictionary of All Religions and Religious Denominations, dedicated as before to John Adams. This was a popular book from the first. It was published in England with a preface and additions by Mr. Andrew Fuller; also in another form by Mr. Thomas Williams, who likewise made alterations. Adams acknowledged herself indebted to both these editions for some of the improvements in her fourth edition. It received the notice of Jared Sparks in the North American Review; he pronounced it the best manual of the kind he knew of. "It has the peculiar merit," he added, "of the strictest candor and impartiality; and so completely has the author divested herself of all in lividual prepossessions, that it may be doubted whether from a single passage in the whole work her own religious sentiments can be inferred. This freedom from personal bias, in exhibiting the views of others, especially on topics rarely touched without calling out private opinion, inspires confidence in her statements, as well as respect for her judgment and Christian charity."
