= Religions of the ancient Near East =

The religions of the ancient Near East were mostly polytheistic, with some examples of monolatry (for example, Yahwism and Atenism). Some scholars believe that the similarities between these religions indicate that the religions are related, a belief known as patternism.

Many religions of the ancient near East and their offshoots can be traced to Proto-Semitic religion. Other religions in the ancient Near East include the ancient Egyptian religion, the Luwian and Hittite religions of Asia Minor and the Sumerian religion of ancient Mesopotamia. Offshoots of Proto-Semitic religion include Canaanite religion and Arabian religion. Judaism is a development of Canaanite religion, both Indo-European and Semitic religions influenced the ancient Greek religion, and Zoroastrianism was a product of ancient Indo-Iranian religion primarily the ancient Iranian religion. In turn these religious traditions strongly influenced the later monotheistic religions of Christianity, Mandaeism, Druzism, Gnosticism, Islam, and Manicheanism, which inherited their monotheism from Judaism and Zoroastrianism.

== Overview ==
The history of the ancient Near East spans more than two millennia, from the Bronze Age to the Early Iron Age, in the region now known as the Middle East, centered on the Fertile Crescent. There was much cultural contact, so that it is justified to summarize the whole region under a single term, but that does not mean, of course, that each historical period and each region should not be looked at individually for a detailed description. This article will attempt to outline the common traits of ancient Near Eastern religions, and refer to sub-articles for in-depth descriptions.

The ancient Near East includes the following subregions:

- Mesopotamia (Sumer, Assyria, Babylonia and Akkad): ancient Mesopotamian religion, Sumerian religion, Babylonian religion
- Ancient Egypt: Ancient Egyptian religion, Atenism
- The Levant (Canaan, Ugarit, Ebla, Mitanni): Canaanite religion, Yahwism, Judaism, Samaritanism, Christianity
  - Carthage: Punic religion
- Arabian Peninsula (Nabatea, Sabaeans, Minaeans): Arabian polytheism
- Anatolia (the Hittites, Assuwa league, Arzawa): Hittite mythology, Hurrian religion, Hattic religion, Luwian religion, Lydian religion
- The Caucasus and the Armenian Highlands (Urartu): Urartian religion
- Ancient Iran (Elam, Media, Persia): Zoroastrianism
- Cyprus, Crete (Minoan civilization): Minoan religion
  - Crete (and Mainland Greece) (Mycenaean Greece): Mycenaean religion
- Ancient North Africa (Ancient Libya, Mauretania, Numidia): Traditional Berber religion

The earliest sources, from c. 2500 BC, allow glimpses of Sumerian religion and ancient Egyptian religion.

Early Hittite religion bore traits descended from Proto-Indo-European religion, but the later Hittite religions became more and more assimilated to Mesopotamian religion. Persian Zoroastrianism is a reformed form of the hypothesized ancient Iranian religion, which shares a common Proto-Aryan root with the Indian Vedic religion.

Ancient Greek religion and the following the Etruscan religion and the Religion in ancient Rome was strongly influenced by ancient Near Eastern religion, but is usually not included in the term. The Greco-Roman mysteries of the Hellenistic period were again consciously connected with ancient Egyptian religion.

The origins of the Roman Mithraism, however, are not resolved. There are theories of an origin in the Indian Vedic religion, the Zoroastrianism and the Greco-Roman Religion like Orion.

There are broad practices that these religions often hold in common:

- Purification and cleansing rituals
- Sacrifices (plant and animal sacrifice, libations; rarely, but prominently in mythology, human sacrifice)
- Polytheism, most frequently characterised by veneration of cult images. Cults dedicated to specific deities within a broader pantheon were common, with their own priesthoods and formalised rituals and devotional practices. Less structured religious belief and practice also existed alongside the formalised cults - e.g., talismanic and apotropaic magic, and belief in the evil eye.
  - Prominent henotheistic or monolatristic traditions also existed - e.g., some ancient Iranian religions, such as Mazdaism (see also Religion in the Achaemenid Empire); or some cases in the ancient Levant, in which worship was sometimes directed primarily or exclusively towards national, ethnic, or tribal gods such as Baal, El, Asherah, Yahweh, or Chemosh.
- City-state–sponsored religions (theocracy)
- Sacred prostitution
- Divination
- Magic (invocations, conjurings and talismans)

Typically, ancient Near Eastern religions were centered on theocracies, with a dominating regional cult of the god of a city-state. There were also super-regional mythemes and deities, such as the God Tammuz and the descent to the underworld.

Divinations:

- Apantomancy: seeing animals
- Cleromancy: drawing lots
- Hepatoscopy: observing the liver of an animal
- Nephomancy: cloud-watching
- Ornithomancy: watching birds in flight
- Capnomancy: divination through smoke
- Oneiromancy: divination through dreams

== Semitic ==
=== Mesopotamia ===
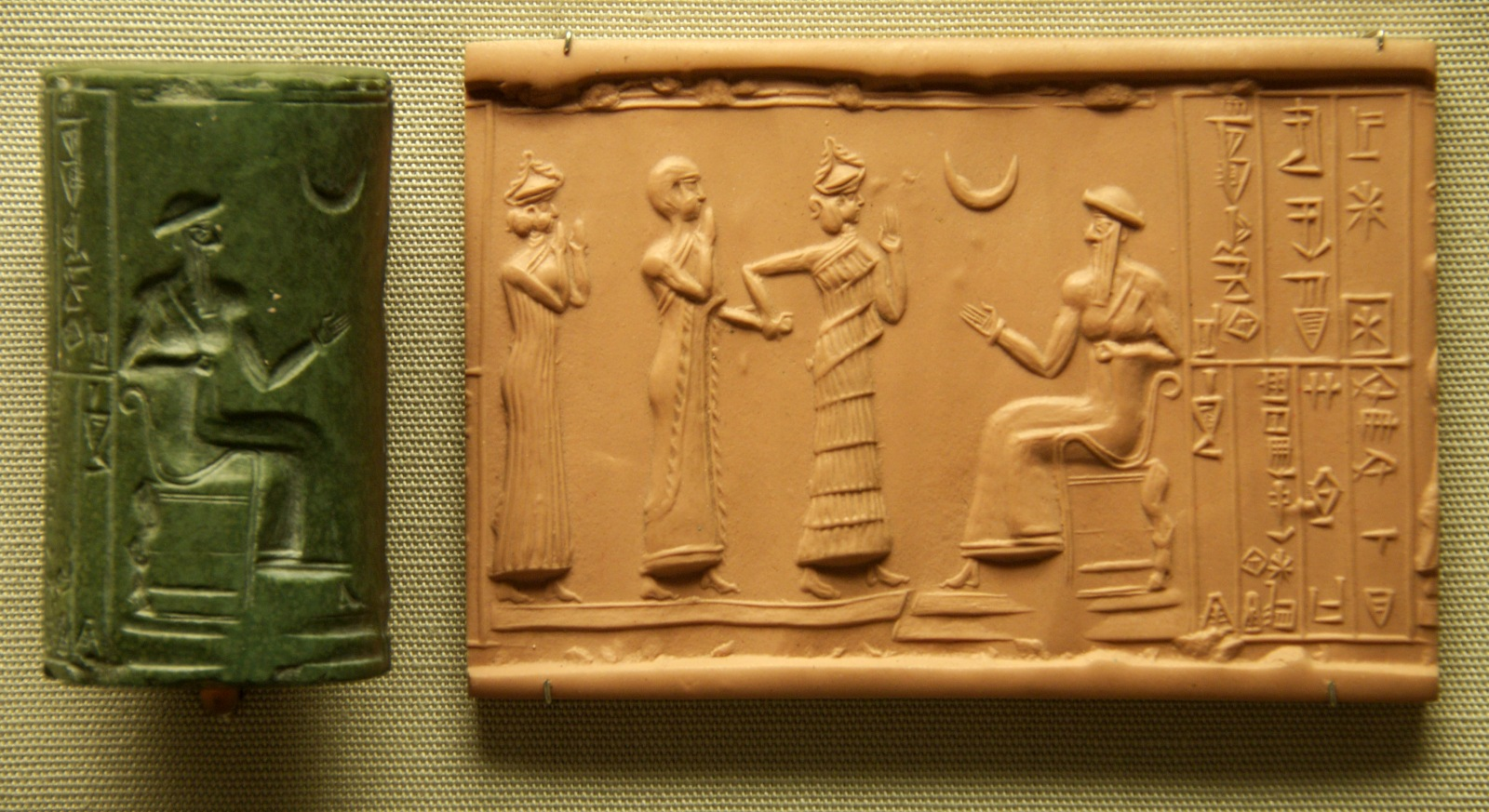
Impression of the cylinder seal of Ḫašḫamer, patesi (High Priest) of Sin at Iškun-Sin, c. 2400 BC

==== Astrology ====
Identification of the gods and goddesses with heavenly bodies, planets, stars, the sun and the moon, and to assigning the seats of all the deities in the Heavens is found in Assyro-Babylonian religion.

The personification of the two great luminaries, the sun and the moon, was the first step in the unfolding of this system, and this was followed by placing the other deities where Shamash and Sin had their seats. This process, which reached its culmination in the post-Hammurabic period, led to identifying the planet Venus with Ishtar, Jupiter with Marduk, Mars with Nergal, Mercury with Nabu, and Saturn with Ninurta.

The system represents a harmonious combination of two factors, one of popular origin, the other the outcome of speculation in the schools attached to the temples of Babylonia. The popular factor is the belief in the influence exerted by the movements of the heavenly bodies on occurrences on earth—a belief naturally suggested by the dependence of life, vegetation and guidance upon the two great luminaries. Starting with this belief the Priests and Priestesses built up the theory of the close correspondence between occurrences on earth and phenomena in the Heavens. The Heavens presenting a constant change even to the superficial observer, the conclusion was drawn of a connection between the changes and the ever-changing movement in the fate of individuals and of nature as well as in the appearance of nature.

To read the signs of the heavens was therefore to understand the meaning of occurrences on Earth, and with this accomplished, it was also possible to foretell what events were portended by the position and relationship to one another of the sun, the moon, the planets and certain stars. Myths that symbolized changes in season or occurrences in nature were projected on the heavens, which were mapped out to correspond to the divisions of the earth.

All the gods, demons and spirits had their places assigned to them in the heavens, and facts, including such as fell within the domain of political history, were interpreted in terms of astral theology. So completely did this system in the course of time sway men's minds that the cults and sects, from being an expression of animistic beliefs, took on the color derived from the "astral" interpretation of occurrences and doctrines. It left its trace in incantations, omens and hymns and gave birth to astronomy, which was assiduously cultivated because a knowledge of the heavens was the very foundation of the system of belief unfolded by the priests of Babylonia and Assyria.

As an illustration of the manner in which the doctrines of the religion were made to conform to the all-pervading astral theory, it will be sufficient to refer to the modification undergone in this process of the view developed in a very early period which apportioned the control of the universe among the three gods Anu, Enlil and Ea. Disassociating these Gods from all local connections, Anu became the power presiding over the Heavens, to Enlil was assigned the earth and the atmosphere immediately above it, while Ea ruled over the deep. With the transfer of all the Gods to the heavens, and under the influence of the doctrine of the correspondence between the heavens and the earth, Anu, Enlil and Ea became the three "ways" (as they are called) on the heavens.

The "ways" appear in this instance to have been the designation of the ecliptic circle, which was divided into three sections or zones—a northern, a middle and a southern zone, Anu being assigned to the first, Enlil to the second, and Ea to the third zone. The astral theology of the Babylonian-Assyrian religion, while thus bearing the ear-marks of a system devised by the priests, succeeded in assimilating the beliefs which represented the earlier attempts to systematize the more popular aspects of the religion, and in this way a unification of diverse elements was secured that led to interpreting the contents and the form of the religion in terms of the astral-theological system.

==== Ethic ====
On the ethical sides, the religion of Babylonia more particularly, and to a less extent that of Assyria, advances to noticeable conceptions of the qualities associated with the gods and goddesses and of the duties imposed on man. Shamash, the Sun-God, was invested with justice as his chief trait, Marduk is portrayed as full of mercy and kindness, and Ea is in general the protector of mankind, a father who takes them under his protection. The gods, to be sure, are easily aroused to anger, and in some of them the dire aspects predominated, but the view becomes more and more pronounced that there is some cause always for the divine wrath. Though, in accounting for the anger of the gods, no sharp distinction is made between moral offences and a ritualistic oversight or neglect, yet the stress laid in the hymns and prayers, as well as in the elaborate atonement ritual prescribed in order to appease the anger of the gods, on the need of being clean and pure in the sight of the higher powers, the inculcation of a proper aspect of humility, and above all the need of confessing one's guilt and sins without any reserve—all this bears testimony to the strength which the ethical factor acquired in the domain of the Religion.

This factor appears to less advantage in the unfolding of the views concerning life after death. Throughout all periods of Babylonian-Assyrian history, the conception prevailed of a large dark cavern below the earth, not far from the Apsu—the fresh water abyss encircling and flowing underneath the earth—in which all the dead were gathered and where they led a miserable existence of inactivity, amid gloom and dust. Occasionally a favoured individual was permitted to escape from this general fate and placed in a pleasant island. It would appear also that the rulers were always singled out for divine grace, and in the earlier periods of the history, owing to the prevailing view that the rulers stood nearer to the gods than other mortals, the kings were deified after death, and in some instances divine honours were paid to them even during their lifetime.

==== Demonology ====
Ancient Near Eastern religion knew an elaborate system of benevolent, neutral and malevolent demons (which more resembled Greek daemons than the Christian concept of evil demons), and much of medicine consisted of exorcisms, e.g. of Lamashtu, the demoness responsible for complications at childbirth and infant deaths.

In Assyrian and Babylonian mythology the seven evil demons were known as Shedu or Lamassu, meaning "storm-demon". They were represented in winged bull form, derived from the colossal bulls used as protective genii of royal palaces, the name "Shed" assumed also the meaning of a propitious genius in Babylonian magical literature.

=== Levant ===
The deities worshipped in Canaanite religion during the Late Bronze Age notably included El Elyon and his sons, the Elohim, the goddess Anat and Hadad, the storm god and heroic slayer of Yam. The composition of the Hebrew Bible began centuries after the Bronze Age collapse, but many of these names are still reflected in Biblical Hebrew, including Elohim and the title Ba'al, originally a title of Hadad, as the rival or nemesis of Yahweh.

== Greater Iran ==
Ancient Iranian lands had a diversity of spiritual beliefs, and the religions included Zoroastrianism, Mazdakism, Manichaeism, Yazdanism, Mandeanism, and others. Ancient Mitanni was centered in modern-day Kurdistan, and from excavations it was discovered to have a history of Zoroastrian practices.

== Egypt ==
The dominant religious rituals and beliefs of ancient Egypt merged and developed over time. As an example, during the New Kingdom, the gods Ra and Amun were syncretized into a single god, Amun-Ra. Such syncretism should be distinguished from mere groupings, also referred to as "families" such as Amun, Mut, and Khonsu. Over time, gods took part in multiple syncretic relationships, for instance, the combination of Ra and Horus into Ra-Herakty. Similarly, Ptah, Seker, and Osiris became Ptah-Seker-Osiris.

== Anatolia ==
Heavily influenced by Mesopotamian mythology, the religion of the Hittites and Luwians retains noticeable Indo-European elements, for example Tarhunt the God of thunder, and his conflict with the Serpent-God Illuyanka.

Tarhunt has a son, Telepinu and a daughter, Inara. Inara is involved with the Puruli spring festival. She is a protective Goddess (^{d}LAMMA). Išḫara is a Goddess of the oath.

== See also ==
- Ancient near eastern cosmology
- History of religion
- Kemetism (Revival of Egyptian religion)
- Panbabylonism
- Religion in the Middle East
- Semitic neopaganism (Revival of Canaanite religion)
- Zuism (Revival of Sumerian religion)

== Bibliography ==
General

- Gordon, Cyrus. The Ancient Near East, (3rd Edition, Revised), W. W. Norton and Company, Inc., New York, 1965.
- Gray, John. Near Eastern Mythology: Mesopotamia, Syria, Palestine. Hamlyn Publishing, 1969.
- James, E.O. The Ancient Gods: The History and Diffusion of Religion in the Ancient Near East and the Eastern Mediterranean, 1960.
- Leick, Gwendolyn. A Dictionary of Ancient Near Eastern Mythology Routledge, London & New York, 2003.
- Pritchard, James B., (ed.). The Ancient Near East: An Anthology of Texts and Pictures. Princeton University Press, New Jersey, 1958.
- Pritchard, James B., (ed.). The Ancient Near East, Volume II: A New Anthology of Texts and Pictures. Princeton University Press, New Jersey, 1975.
- Sasson, Jack et al., (eds.). Civilizations of the Ancient Near East. Charles Scribner's Sons, New York, 1995.
- Smith, Mark S. God in translation: deities in cross-cultural discourse in the biblical world, vol. 57 of "Forschungen zum Alten Testament", Mohr Siebeck, 2008, ISBN 978-3-16-149543-4.
- Smith, Morton. The Common Theology of the Ancient near East, Journal of Biblical Literature, 1952.
- Snell, Daniel. Religions of the Ancient Near East. Cambridge University Press, Cambridge, 2010.
- van der Toorn, Karel (1995). Dictionary of Deities and Demons in the Bible. New York: E.J. Brill. ISBN 0-8028-2491-9.

Canaan and Ugarit

- Pardee, Dennis. Ritual and Cult at Ugarit. Society of Biblical Literature, Atlanta, Georgia. 2002.
- Parker, Simon B. (ed.). Ugaritic Narrative Poetry. Society of Biblical Literature, U.S.A., 1997.
- Smith, Mark S. The Ugaritic Baal Cycle, Volume I: Introduction with Text, Translation and Commentary of KTU 1.1-1.2. E.J. Brill, Leiden, the Netherlands, 1994.
