= M10 (Istanbul Metro) =

Metro line in Istanbul, Turkey

M10 Pendik Merkez–Sabiha Gökçen Airport

Overview
- Status: (M4A Operating); M10 Under construction
- Owner: Istanbul Metropolitan Municipality
- Locale: Istanbul, Turkey
- Termini: Pendik railway station; Sabiha Gökçen Airport
- Stations: 6

Service
- Type: Rapid transit
- System: Istanbul Metro
- Services: 1
- Operator: Metro Istanbul

History
- Planned opening: 20 May 2027; 7 months' time

Technical
- Line length: 9.64 km (5.99 mi)
- Number of tracks: 2
- Track gauge: 1,435 mm (4 ft 8 1/2 in) standard gauge
- Electrification: 1,500 V DC Overhead line

The M10 is a rapid transit line in the Asian part of the Istanbul Metro system that leads to Sabiha Gökçen Airport. Initially named and tendered as the M10 Pendik Merkez–Fevzi Çakmak, with the full line being named as the M10 Pendik Merkez–Sabiha Gökçen Airport, the line was supposed to complete the link between Pendik railway station and the M4ᴀ extension branch of the M4 line. The tender of this project was later cancelled on 3 January 2018 The project's budget is 86 million euros. and on 30 September 2022, a contract was signed with the new contractor company, with a value of ₺2.896.691.000 and works restarted in November 2022. It is expected to open in early 2027.

Starting from the Pendik railway station, the line will head northeast, cut orthogonally the M4ʙ extension branch of the M4 line at Kaynarca Merkez station, join the M4ᴀ extension branch of the M4 line just before Fevzi Çakmak-Hastane station, and continue to Sabiha Gökçen Airport.

== Stations ==
All stations are underground.

| No | Station | Connections | Notes |
|---|---|---|---|
| 1 | Pendik Merkez | Marmaray・ İETT Bus: 16, 16A, 16D, 17, 132, 132A, 132B, 132D, 132E, 132F, 132G, 132H, 132K, 132P, 132V, 133A, 133AK, 133GP, 133K, 133KT, 132T, 132Ü, 133Ş, 251, KM3, KM10, KM13, KM18, KM24, KM26, KM27, KM28, KM33, KM37, KM72, KRB3, MR60 | Park and Ride facility |
| 2 | Kaynarca Merkez | M4ʙ; İETT Bus: 130A, 130E, 130Ş, 130ŞT, 132F,132T,133K,133T, 500L, 500T, E-9, KM2, KM10, KM11, KM12, KM13, KM17, KM24, MR60 | |
| 3 | Fevzi Çakmak-Hastane | M4ᴀ; İETT Bus: 16KH, 132P, 132V, 132Y, KM29 | |
| 4 | Yayalar–Şeyhli | M4ᴀ; İETT Bus: 16KH, 132, 132A, 132B, 132D, 132E, 132H, 133GP, 133Ü, E-10, KM18, KM25, KM27, KM28, KM29 | |
| 5 | Kurtköy | M4ᴀ; İETT Bus: 16KH, 132, 132A, 132B, 132D, 132E, 132H, 133GP, 133Ü, E-10, KM18, KM25, KM27, KM28, KM29, KM37 | |
| 6 | Sabiha Gökçen Airport | M4ᴀ; İETT Bus: E-3, E-9, E-10, E-11 | |
