= Yayalar–Şeyhli station =

Station of the Istanbul Metro

Yayalar-Şeyhli
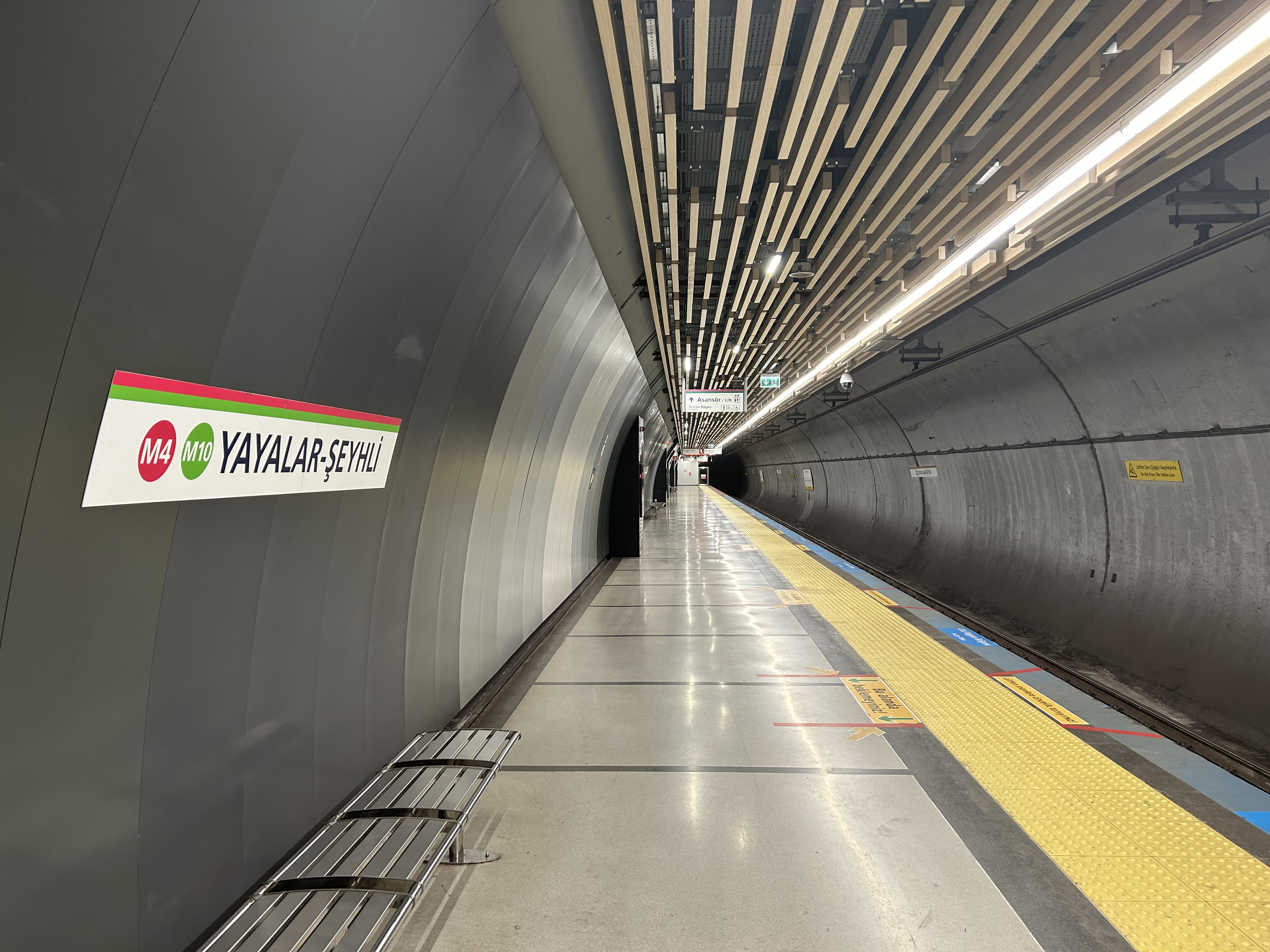
- Platform

General information
- Location: Yayalar Neighborhood, Ankara Street, 34909; Pendik, Istanbul; Turkey
- Coordinates: 40°54′14″N 29°16′32″E
- System: Istanbul Metro rapid transit station
- Owner: Istanbul Metropolitan Municipality
- Line: M4
- Platforms: 1 Island platform
- Tracks: 2
- Connections: İETT Bus: 16KH, 132, 132A, 132B, 132D, 132E, 132H, 133GP, 133Ü, E-10, KM18, KM25, KM27, KM28, KM29; Istanbul Minibus: Pendik - Orhanlı

Construction
- Structure type: Underground
- Parking: 300 spaces
- Cycle facilities: Yes
- Accessible: Yes

History
- Opened: 2 October 2022 (3 years ago)
- Electrified: 1,500 V DC Overhead line

Services
Preceding station	Istanbul Metro	Following station
Fevzi Çakmak-Hastane towards Kadıköy	M4 Line	Kurtköy towards Sabiha Gökçen Airport
Location

Yayalar-Şeyhli is an underground rapid transit station on the M4 line of the Istanbul Metro. It is located under Ankara Street in the Yayalar neighborhood of Pendik. It was opened on 2 October 2022 with the extension of M4 line from Tavşantepe to Sabiha Gökçen Airport.

The station includes a nearby land parking lot which has 300 parking spaces, built and operated by Pendik Municipality.

== Layout ==
Westbound	← toward Kadıköy (Fevzi Çakmak-Hastane)
Island platform, doors will open on the left
Eastbound	toward Sabiha Gökçen Airport (Kurtköy) →

== Operation information ==
The M4 line operates between 06:00 and 00:00 with a train frequency of 4 minutes at peak hours and 7 minutes at all other times. The line also operates night metro services between 00:00 and 06:00 on Saturdays and Sundays, with trains running every 30 minutes. This provides 66 hours of uninterrupted service between Friday and Sunday. During these hours, fares are charged at double the price. During this time, Entrance 1 is open, and Entrance 2 is closed.

== Gallery ==
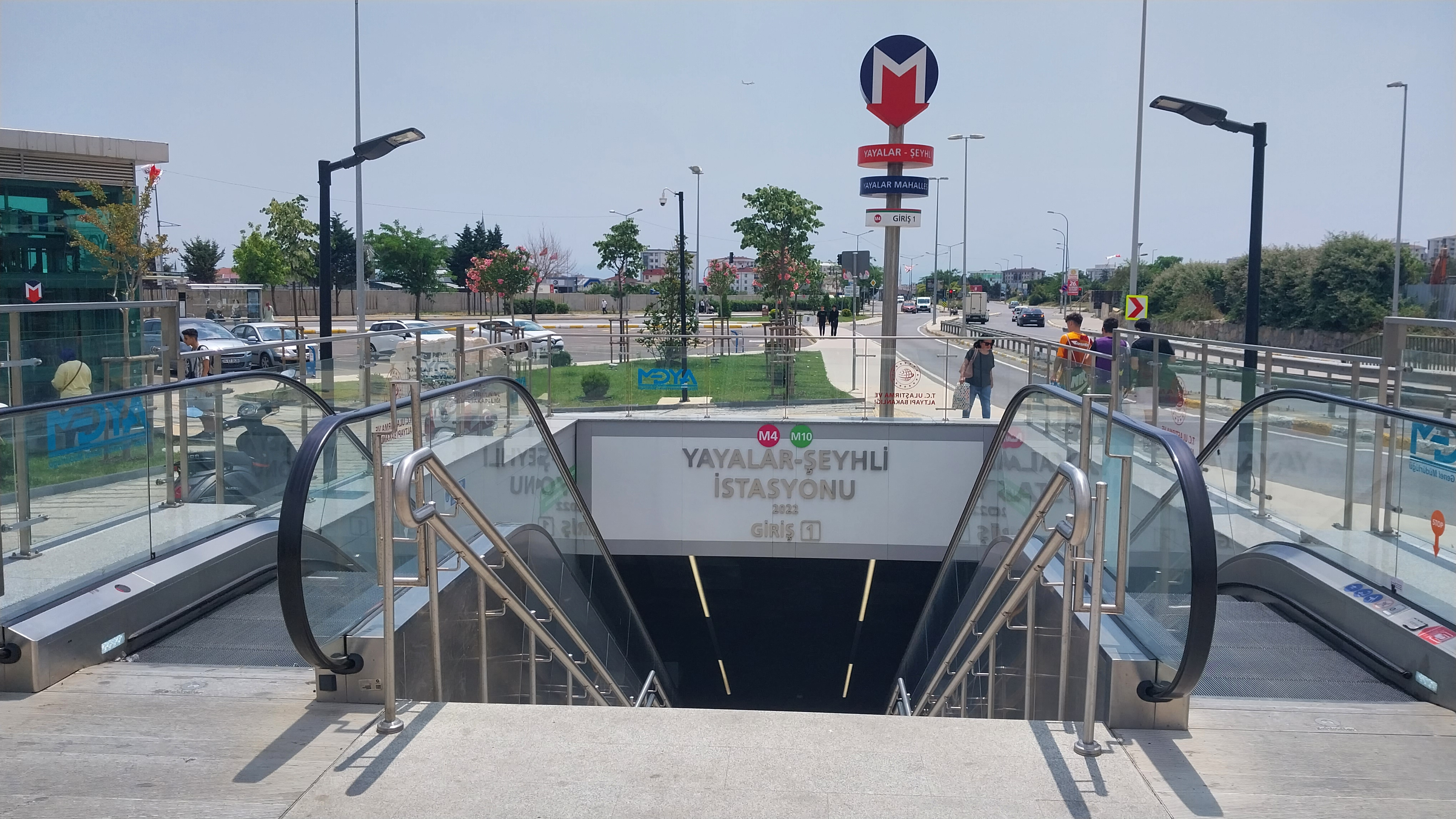
Entrance 1

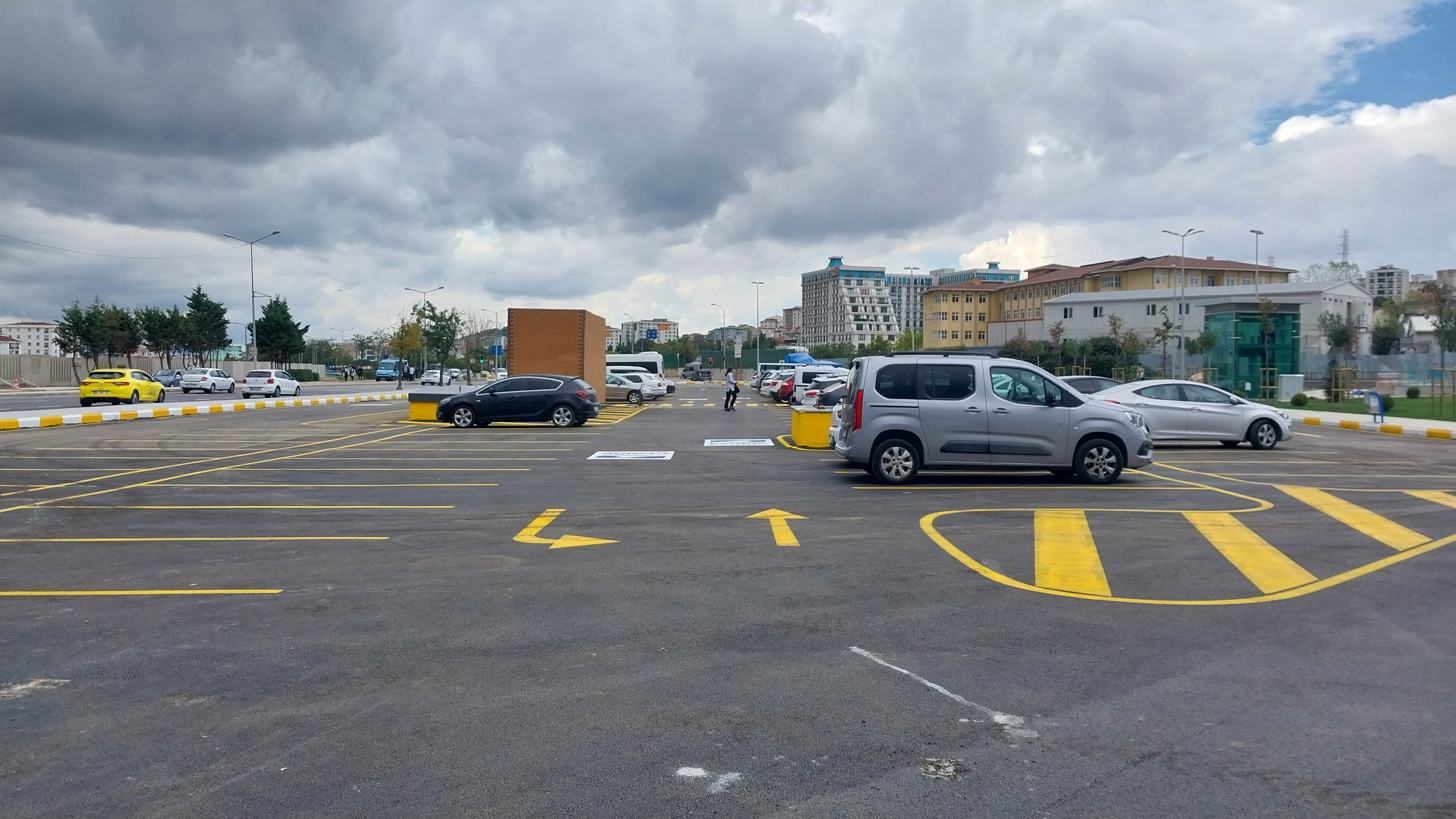
Parking

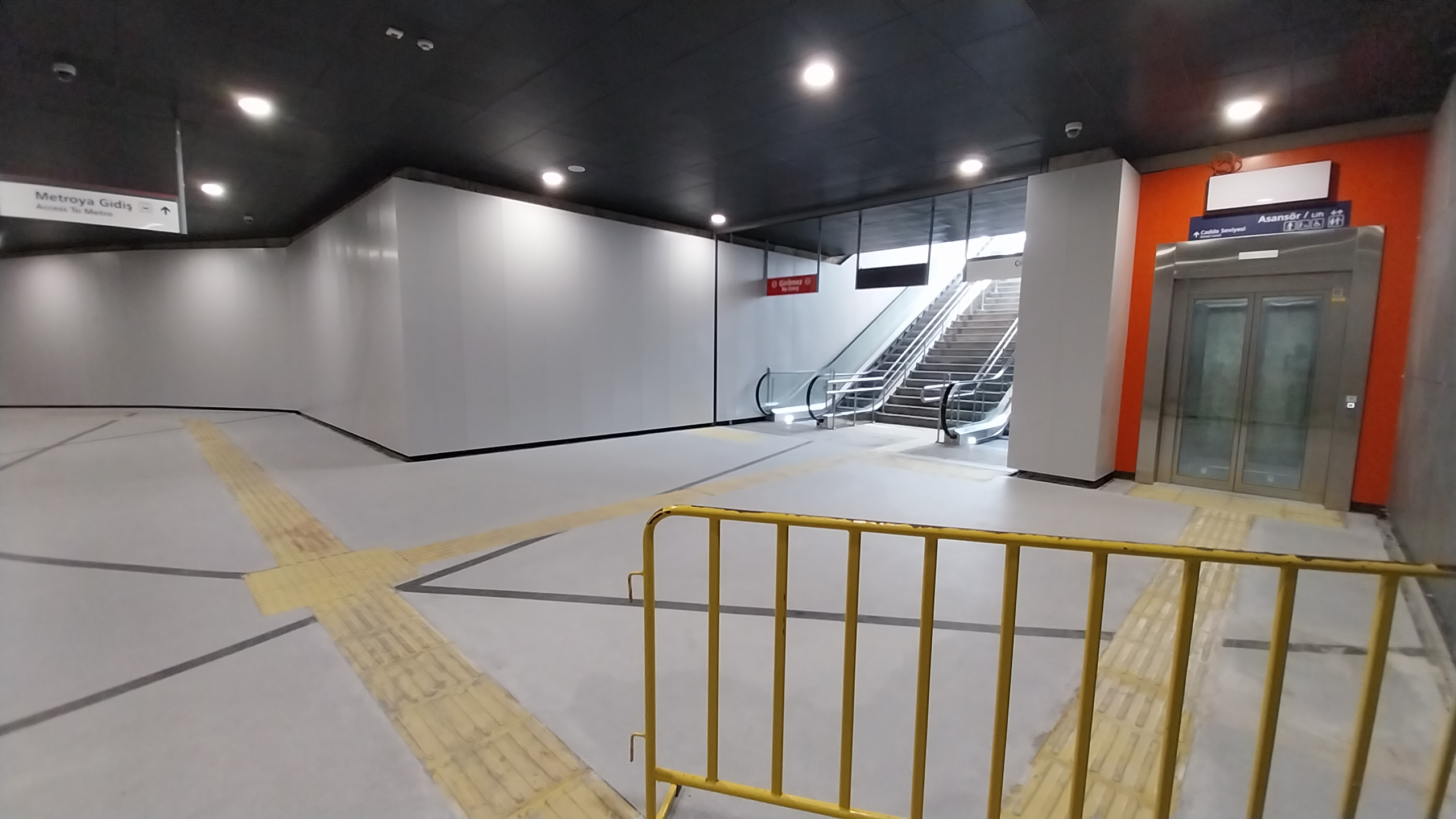
Entrance 2

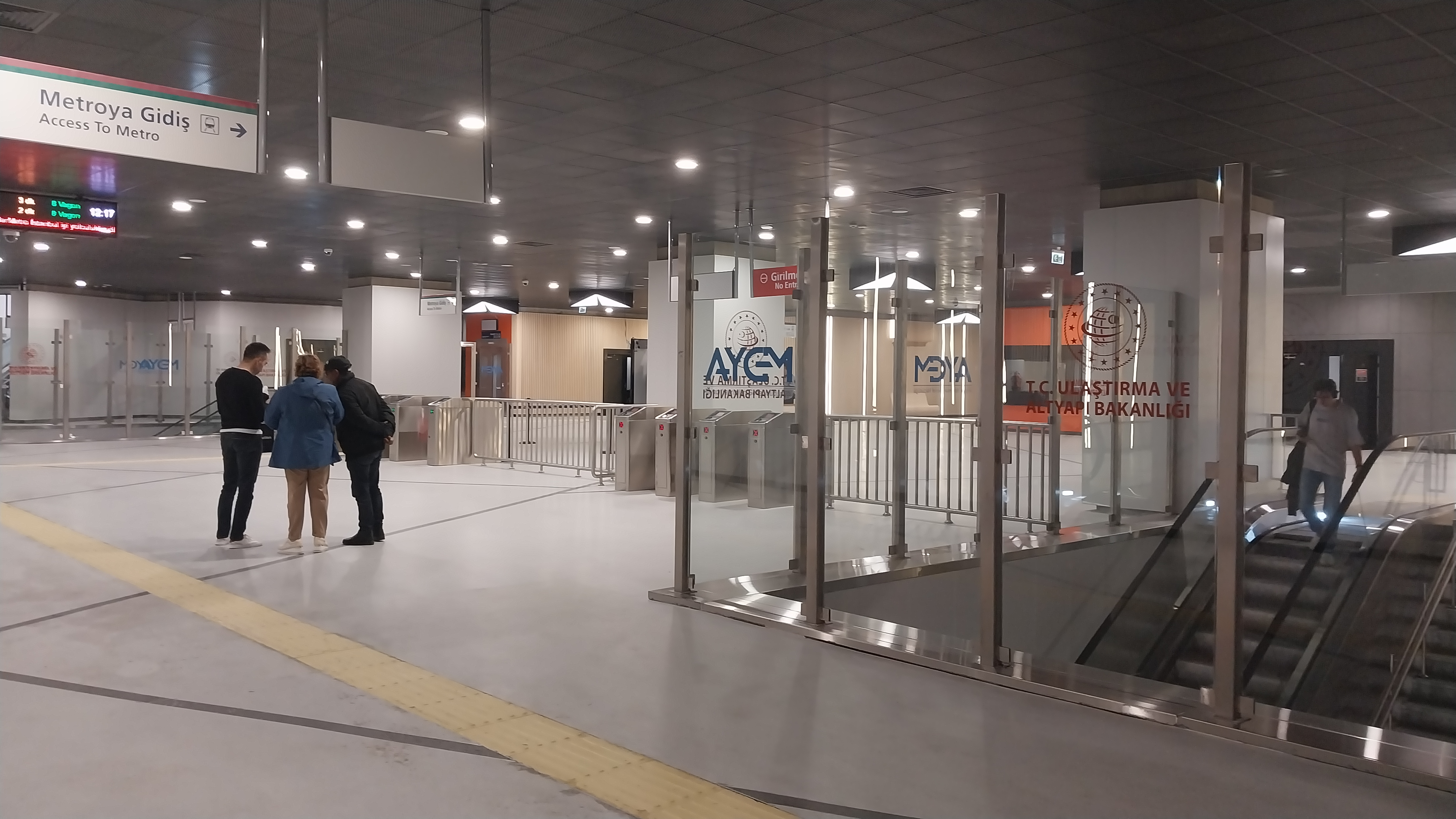
Ticket hall

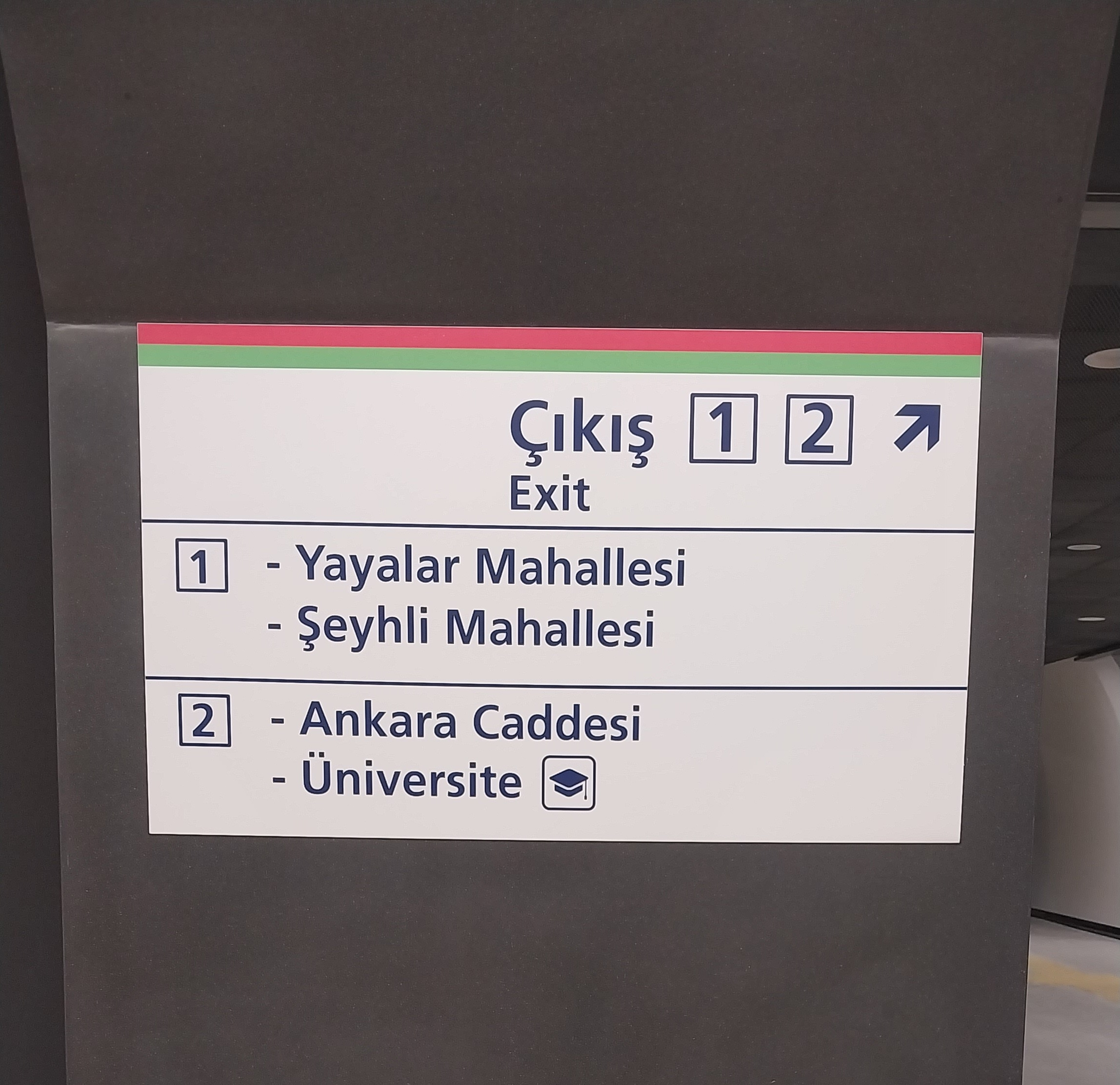
Exit sign

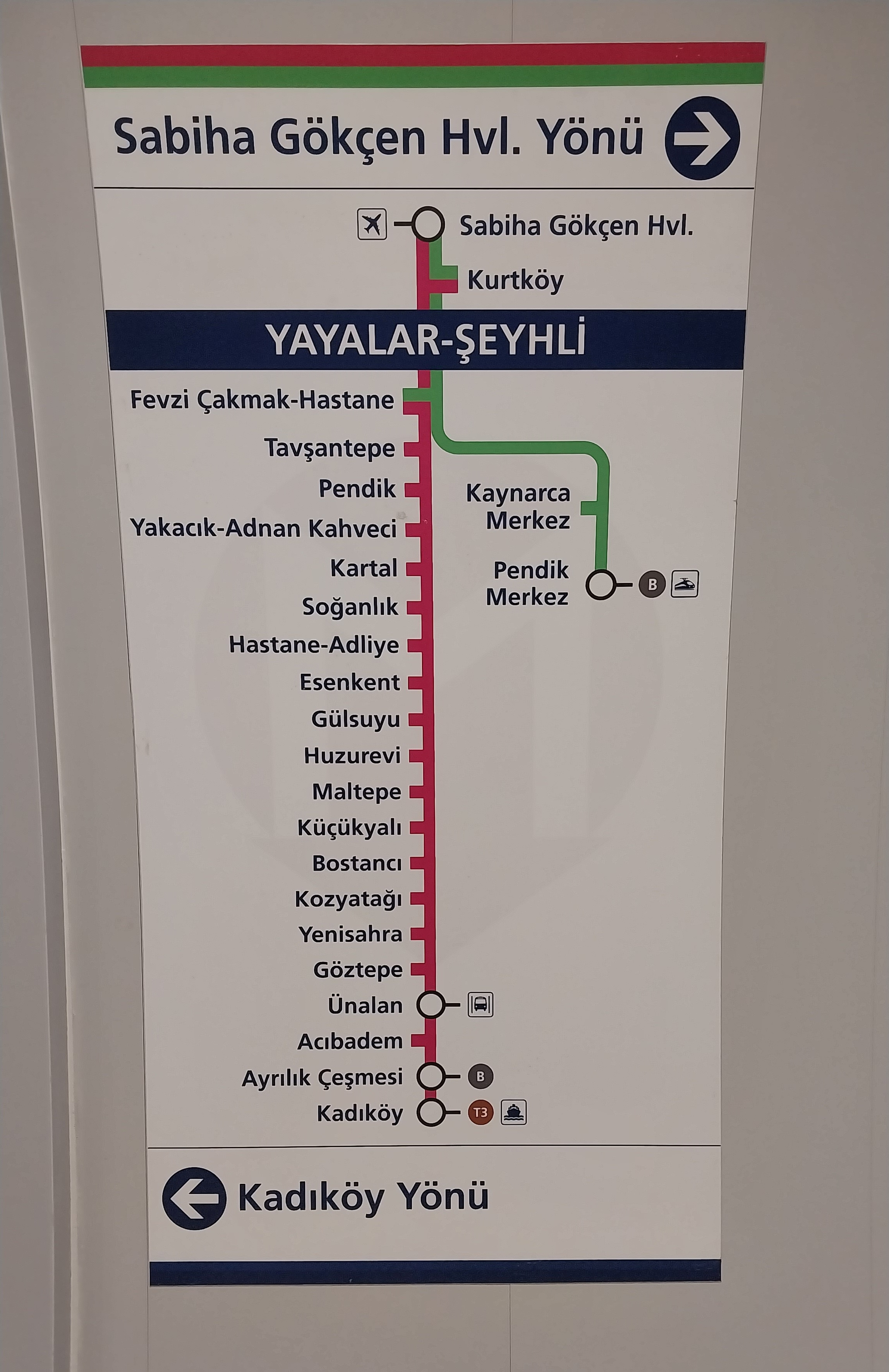
Route diagram

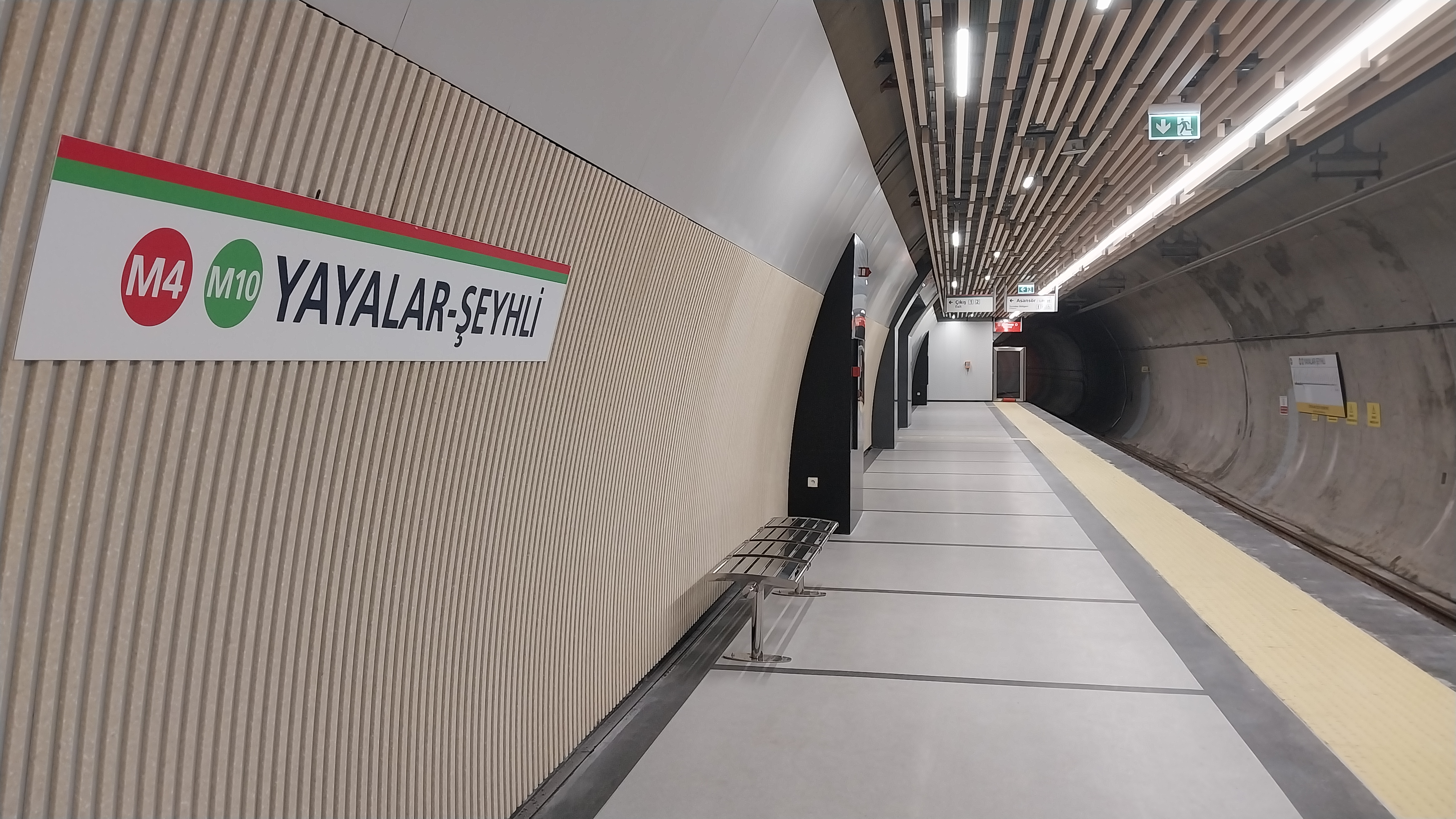
Platform
