= Kurtköy station =

Station of the Istanbul Metro

Kurtköy
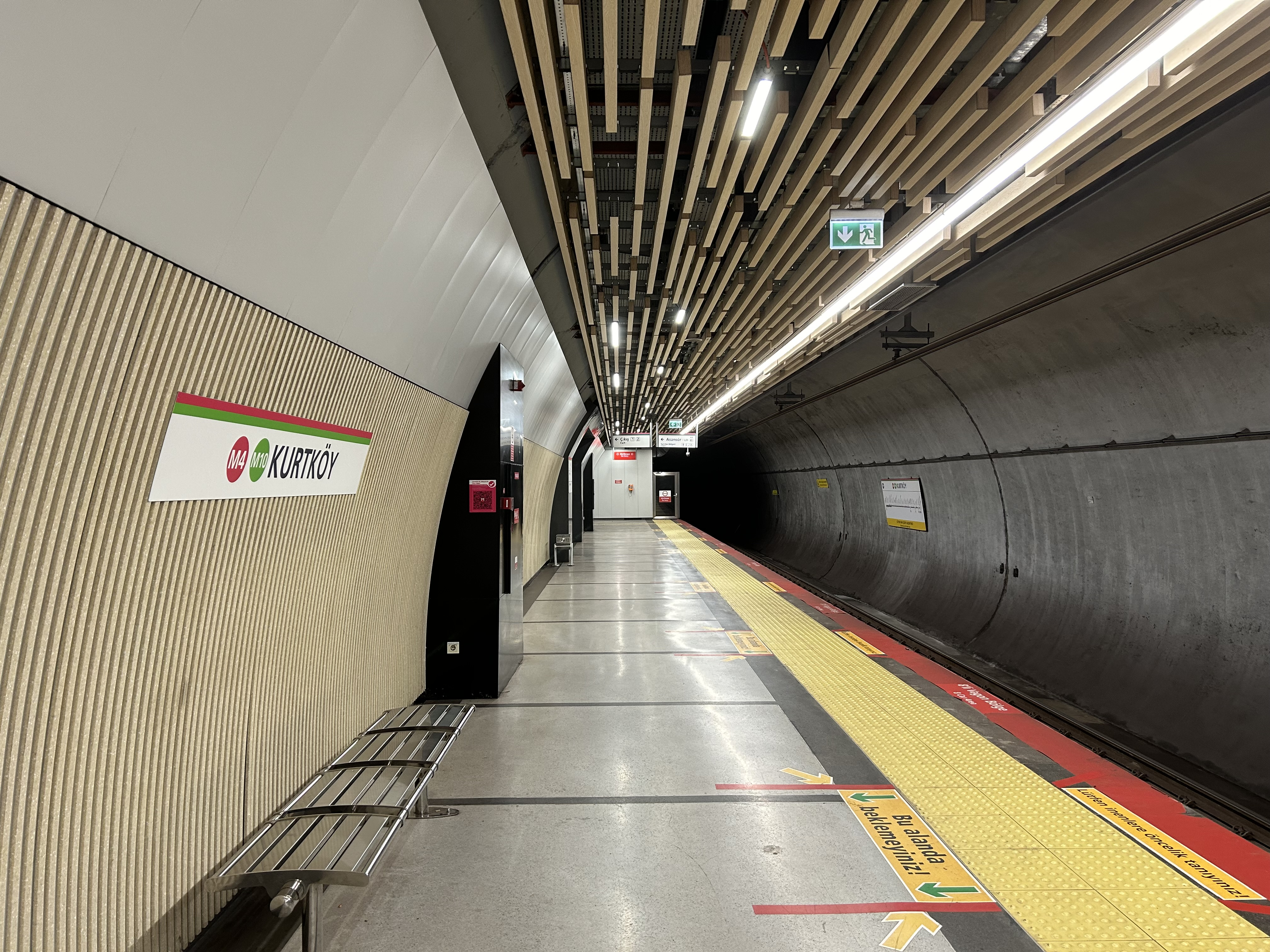
- Platform

General information
- Location: Kurtköy Neighborhood, Ankara Street, 34912; Pendik, Istanbul; Turkey
- Coordinates: 40°54′36″N 29°17′48″E
- System: Istanbul Metro rapid transit station
- Owner: Istanbul Metropolitan Municipality
- Line: M4
- Platforms: 1 Island platform
- Tracks: 2
- Connections: İETT Bus: Kurtköy Mahallesi Metro: 16KH, 132, 132A, 132B, 132D, 132E, 132H, 133GP, 133Ü, E-10, KM18, KM25, KM27, KM28, KM29; Istanbul Minibus: Pendik - Orhanlı, Sultanbeyli - Kurtköy

Construction
- Structure type: Underground
- Parking: No
- Cycle facilities: Yes
- Accessible: Yes

History
- Opened: 2 October 2022 (3 years ago)
- Electrified: 1,500 V DC Overhead line

Services
Preceding station	Istanbul Metro	Following station
Yayalar–Şeyhli towards Kadıköy	M4 Line	Sabiha Gökçen Airport Terminus
Location

Kurtköy is an underground rapid transit station on the M4 line of the Istanbul Metro. It is located under Ankara Street in the Kurtköy neighborhood of Pendik. It was opened on 2 October 2022 with the extension of M4 line from Tavşantepe to Sabiha Gökçen Airport.

== Layout ==
Westbound	← toward Kadıköy (Yayalar-Şeyhli)
Island platform, doors will open on the left
Eastbound	toward Sabiha Gökçen Airport (terminus) →

== Operation information ==
The M4 line operates between 06:00 and 00:00 with a train frequency of 4 minutes at peak hours and 7 minutes at all other times. The line also operates night metro services between 00:00 and 06:00 on Saturdays and Sundays, with trains running every 30 minutes. This provides 66 hours of uninterrupted service between Friday and Sunday. During these hours, fares are charged at double the price. During this time, Entrance 1 is open, and Entrance 2 is closed.

== Gallery ==
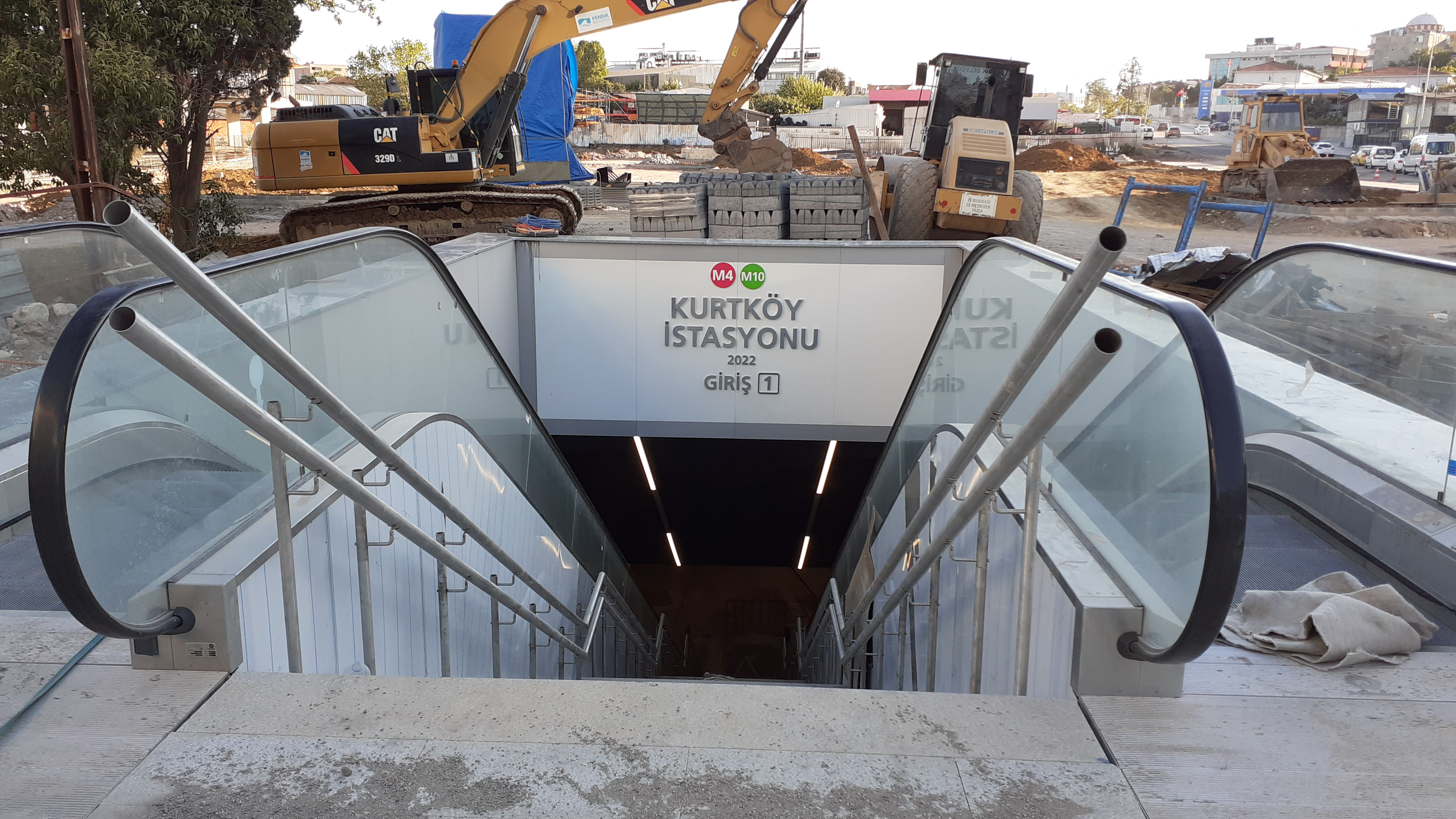
Under construction (July 2022)

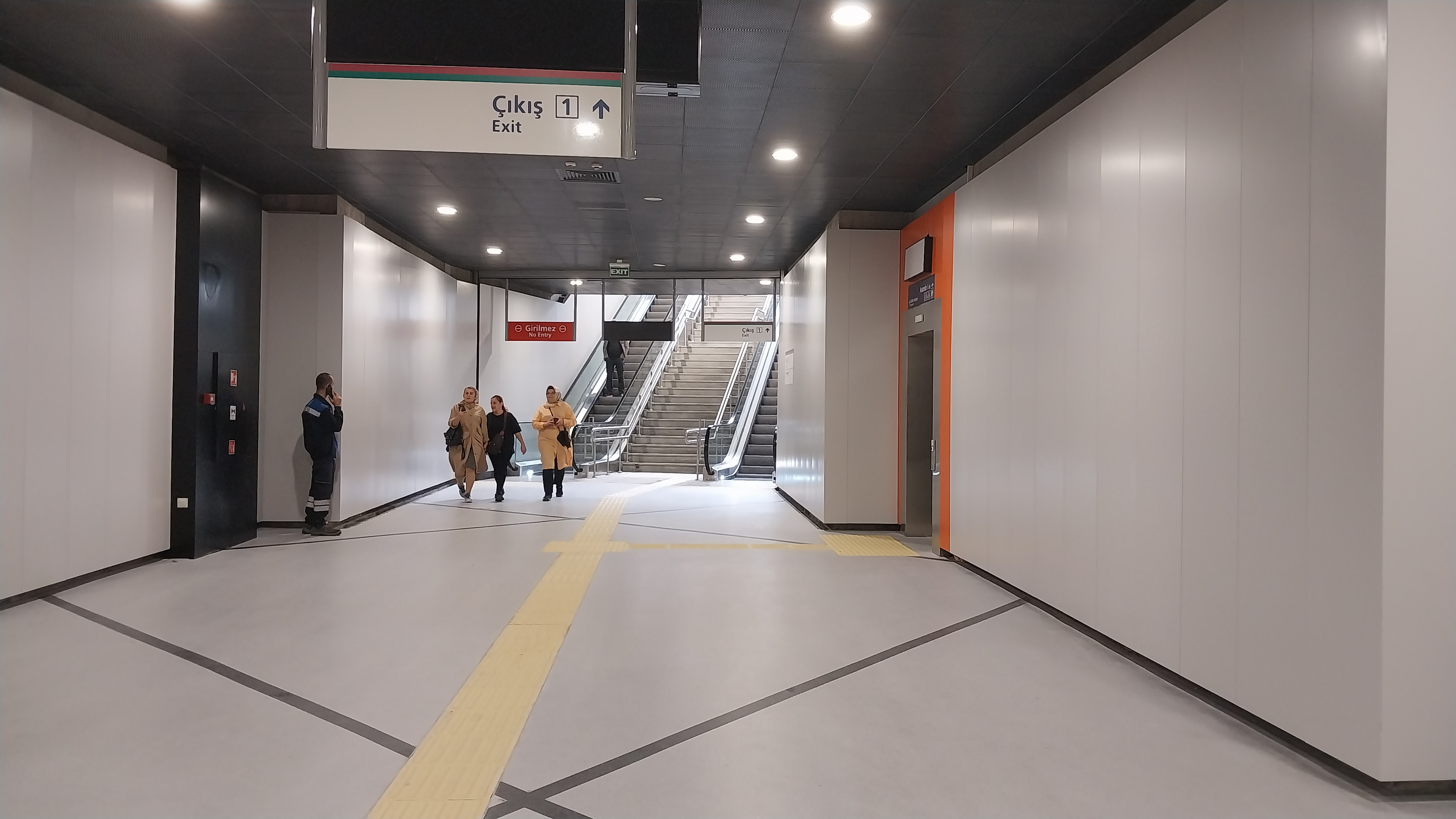
Entrance 1

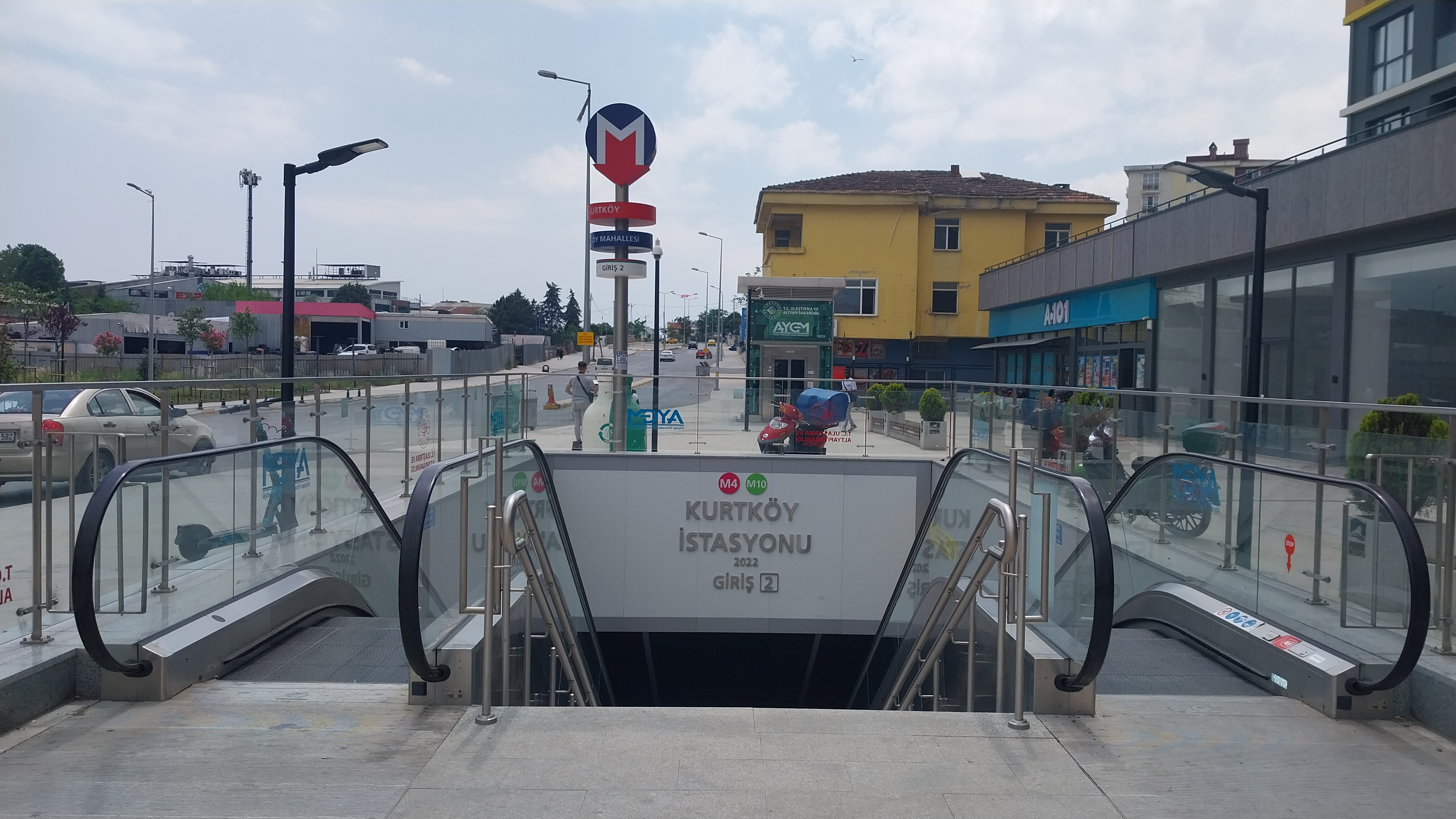
Entrance 2

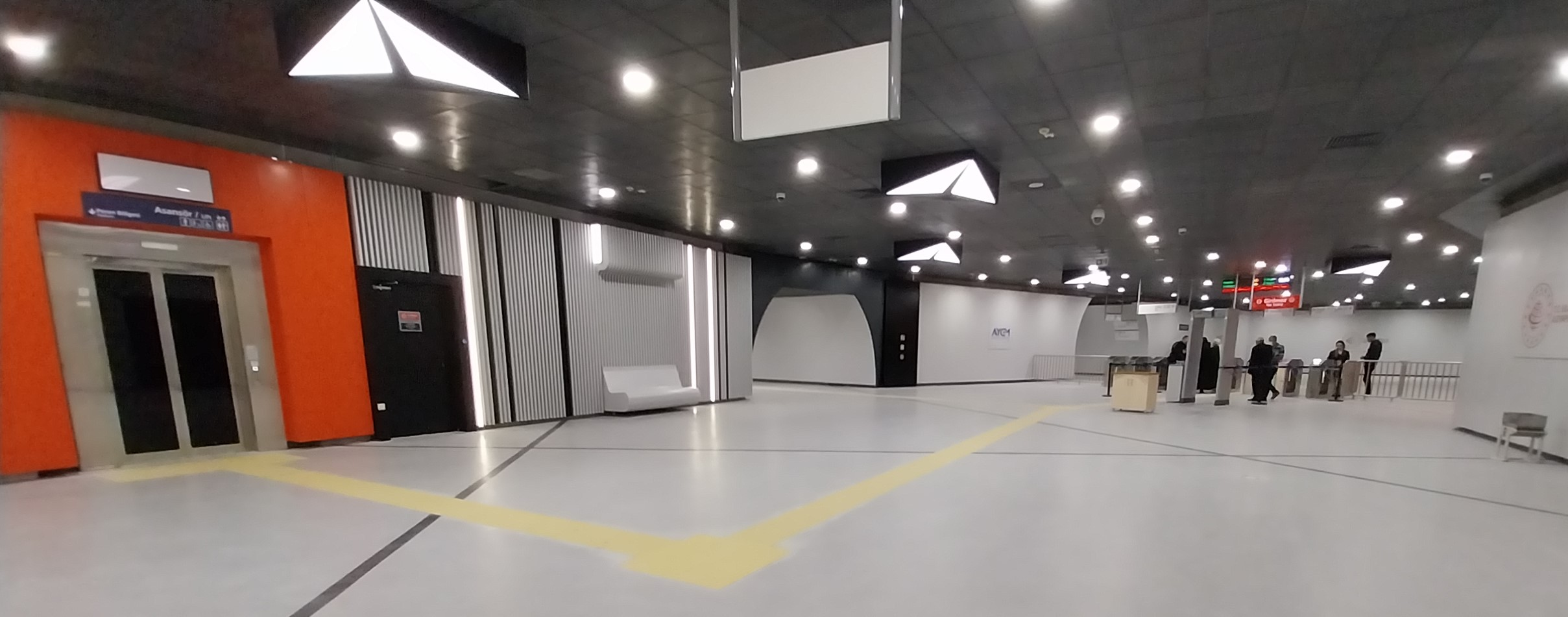
Ticket hall

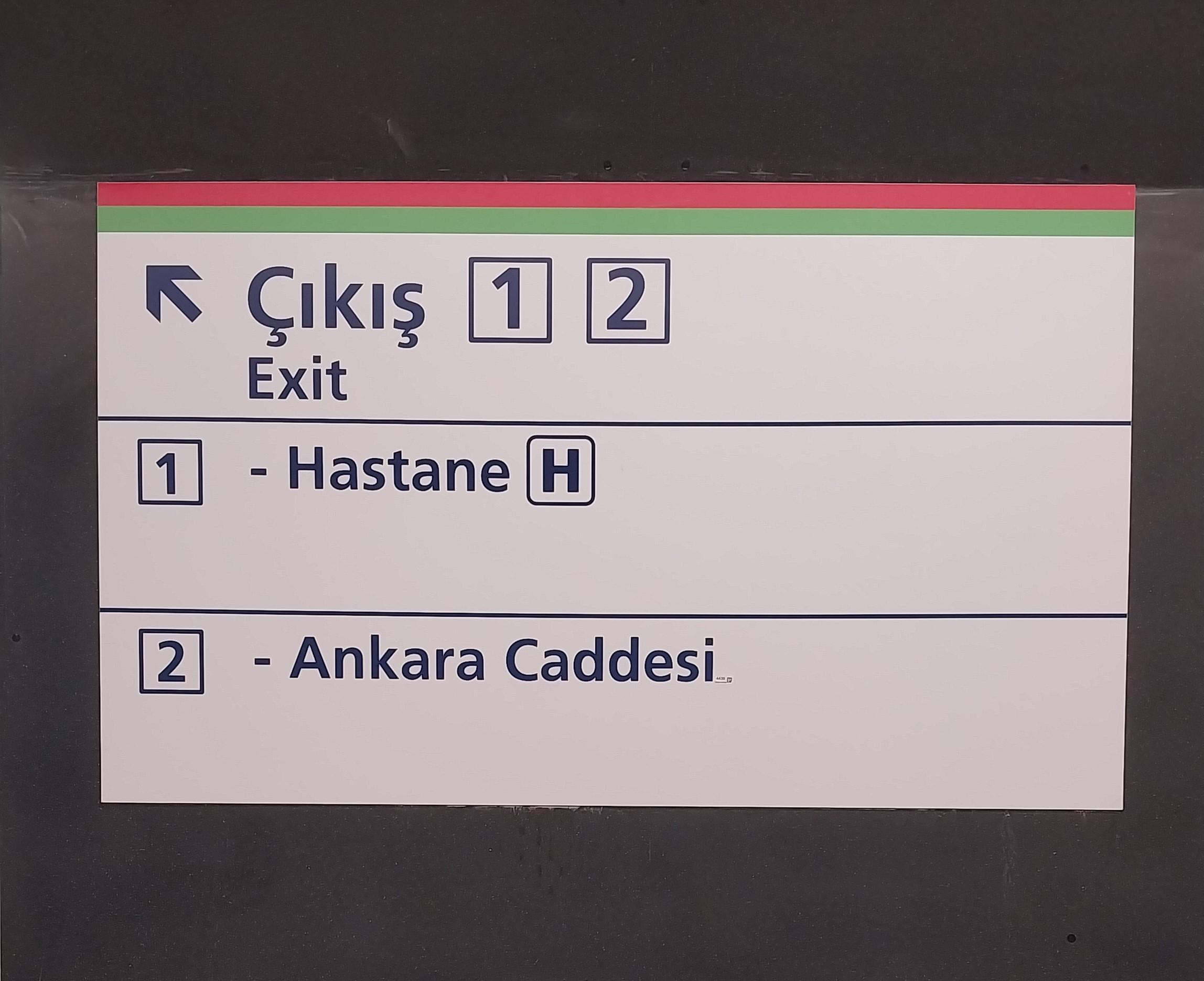
Exit sign

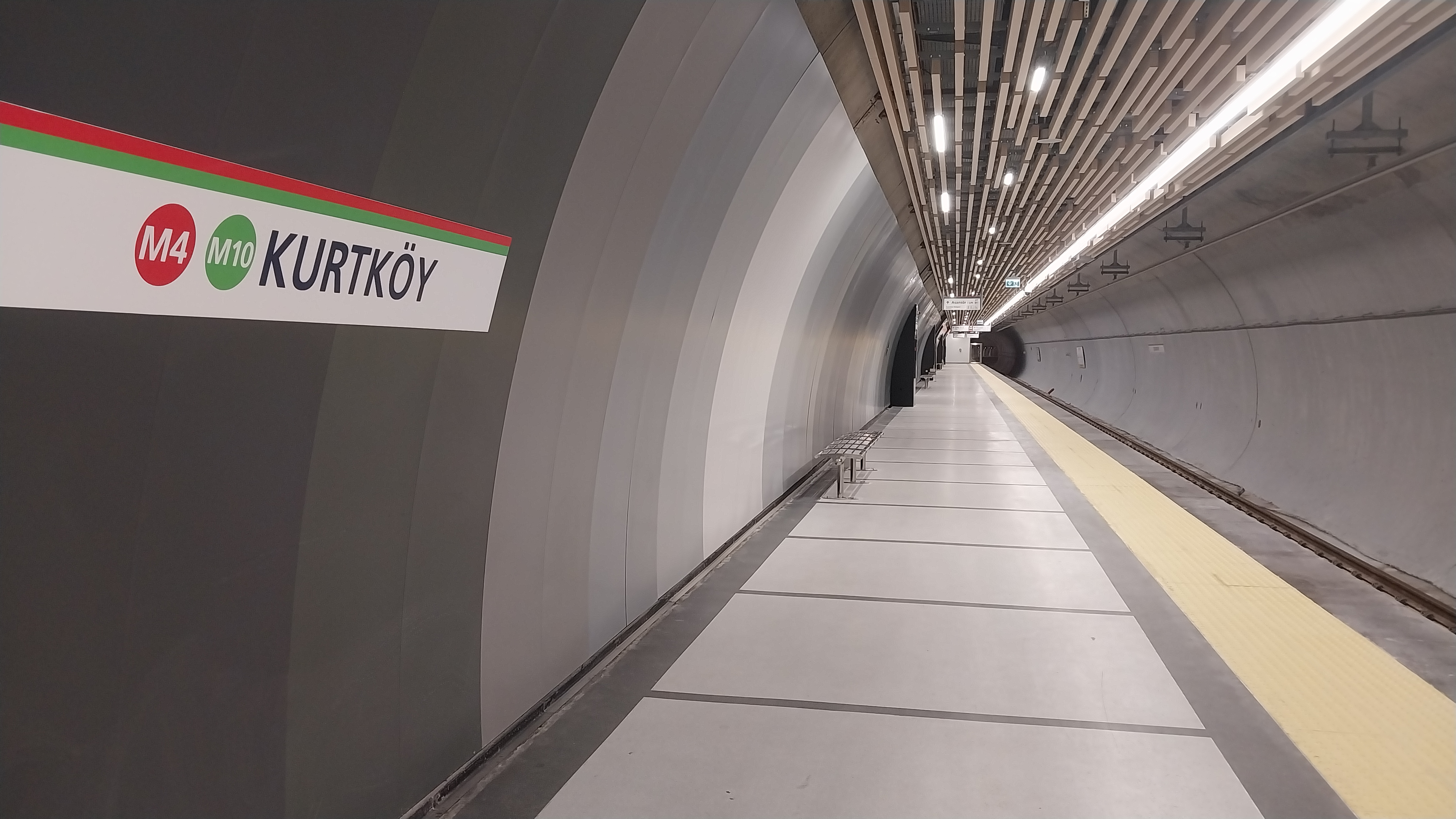
Platform
