= Fevzi Çakmak-Hastane station =

Station of the Istanbul Metro

Fevzi Çakmak-Hastane
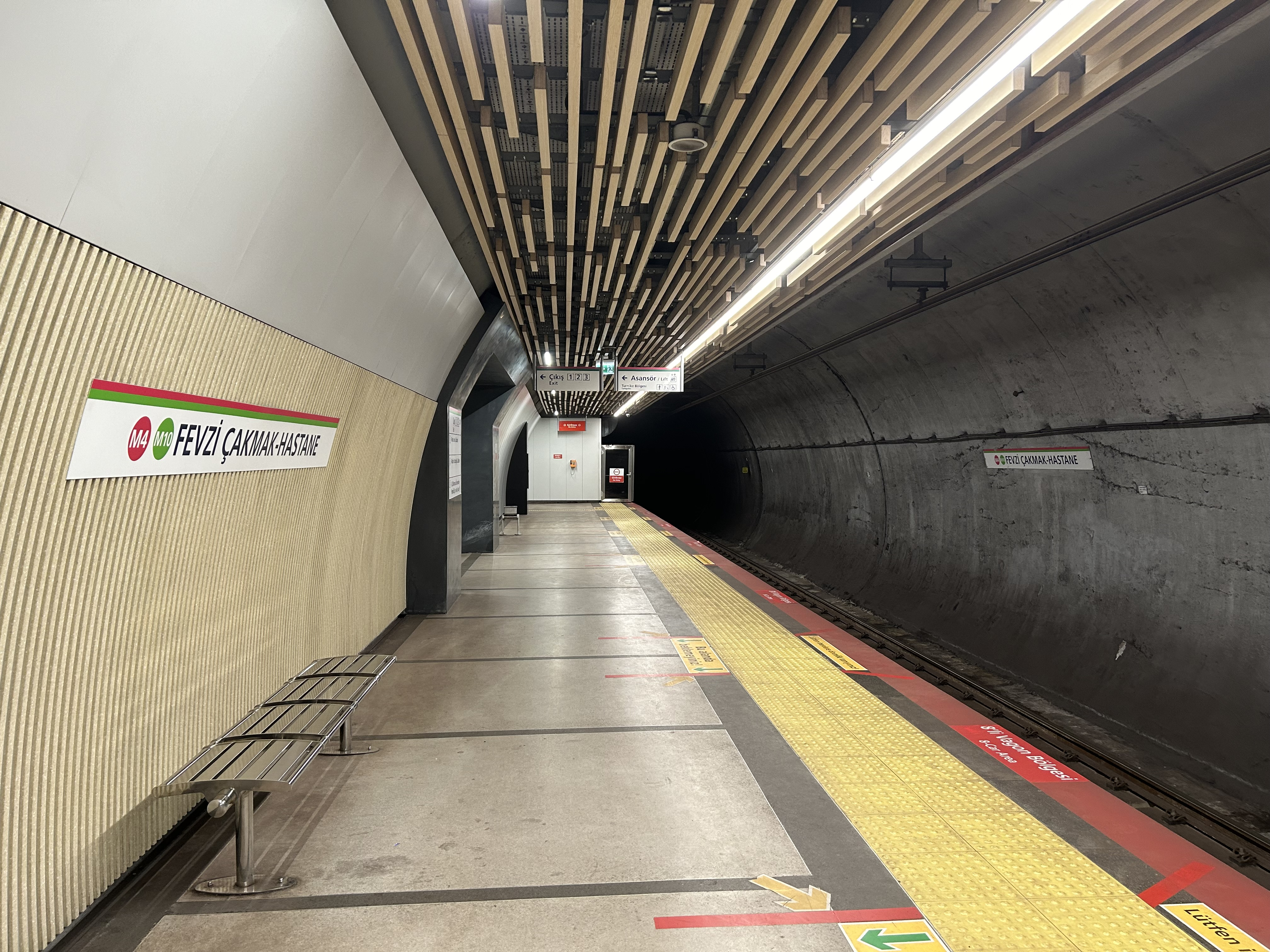
- Platform

General information
- Location: Fevzi Çakmak Neighborhood, Mimar Sinan Street / Ankara Street, 34899; Pendik, Istanbul; Turkey
- Coordinates: 40°53′20″N 29°15′45″E
- System: Istanbul Metro rapid transit station
- Owner: Istanbul Metropolitan Municipality
- Line: M4
- Platforms: 1 Island platform
- Tracks: 2
- Connections: İETT Bus: Bora Sokak: 16KH, 132P, 132V, 132Y, KM29; Istanbul Minibus: Pendik - Orhanlı

Construction
- Structure type: Underground
- Parking: 500 spaces
- Cycle facilities: Yes
- Accessible: Yes

History
- Opened: 2 October 2022 (3 years ago)
- Electrified: 1,500 V DC Overhead line

Services
Preceding station	Istanbul Metro	Following station
Tavşantepe towards Kadıköy	M4 Line	Yayalar–Şeyhli towards Sabiha Gökçen Airport
Location

Fevzi Çakmak-Hastane is an underground rapid transit station on the M4 line of the Istanbul Metro. It is located under the intersection of Mimar Sinan Street and Ankara Street in the Fevzi Çakmak neighborhood of Pendik. It was opened on 2 October 2022 with the extension of M4 line from Tavşantepe to Sabiha Gökçen Airport.

The station includes a nearby land parking lot which has 500 parking spaces, built and operated by Pendik Municipality.

== Layout ==
Westbound	← toward Kadıköy (Tavşantepe)
Island platform, doors will open on the left
Eastbound	toward Sabiha Gökçen Airport (Yayalar–Şeyhli) →

== Operation information ==
The M4 line operates between 06:00 and 00:00 with a train frequency of 4 minutes at peak hours and 7 minutes at all other times. The line also operates night metro services between 00:00 and 06:00 on Saturdays and Sundays, with trains running every 30 minutes. This provides 66 hours of uninterrupted service between Friday and Sunday. During these hours, fares are charged at double the price. During this time, Entrance 1 is open, whilst Entrances 2 and 3 are closed.

== Nearby places of interest ==
- Pendik Marmara University Hospital

== Gallery ==
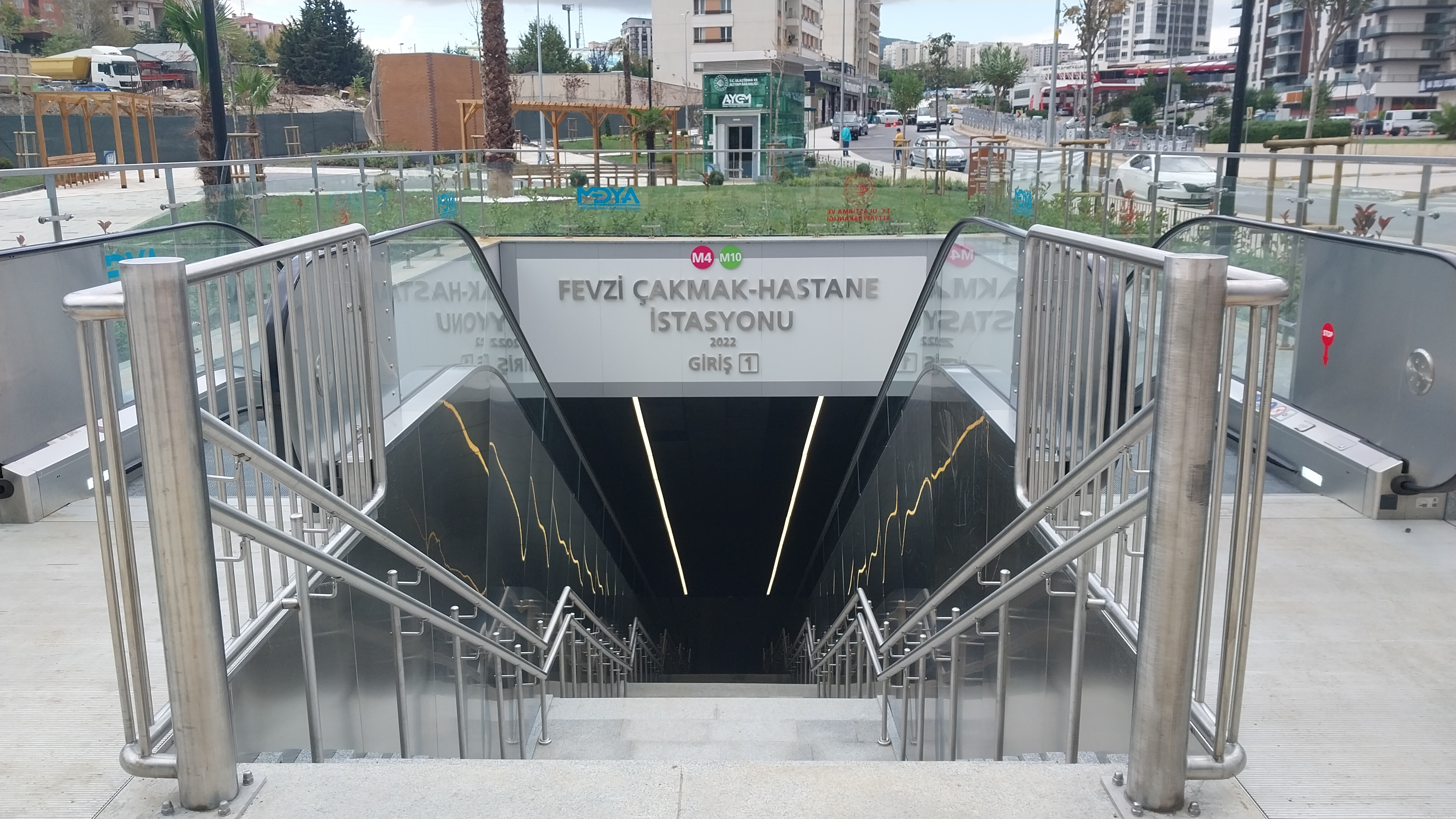
Entrance 1

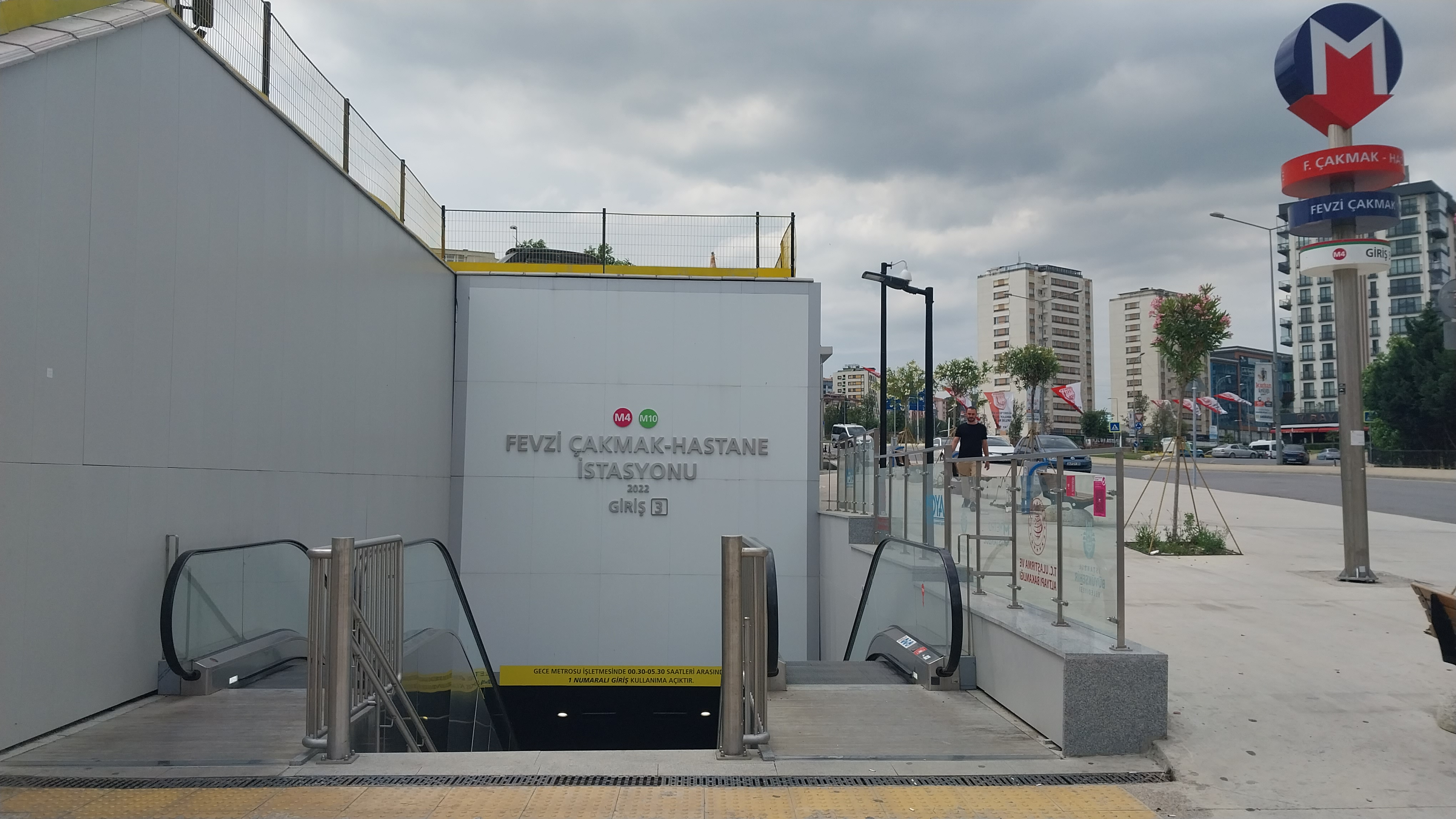
Entrance 3

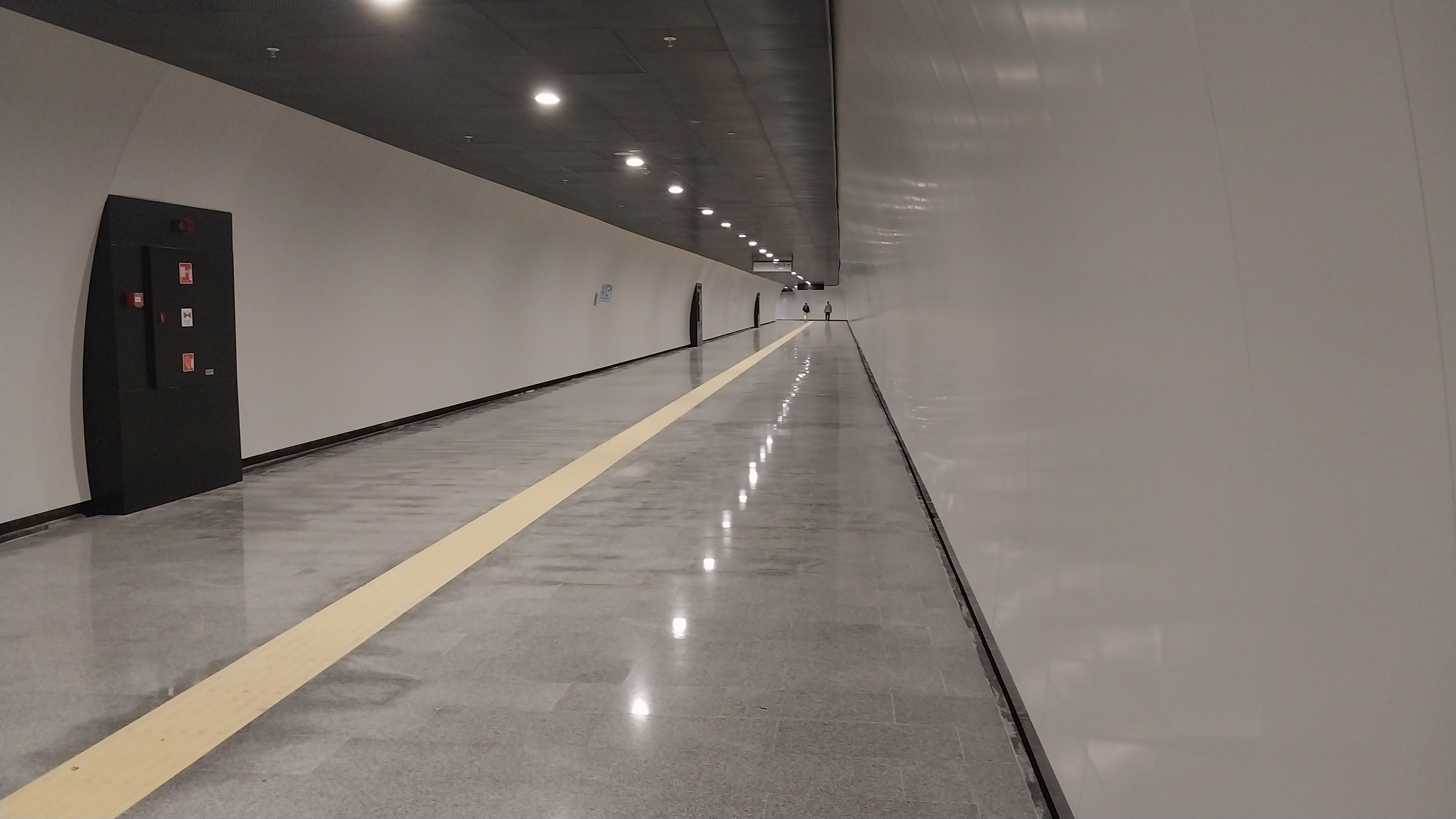
Pedestrian underpass

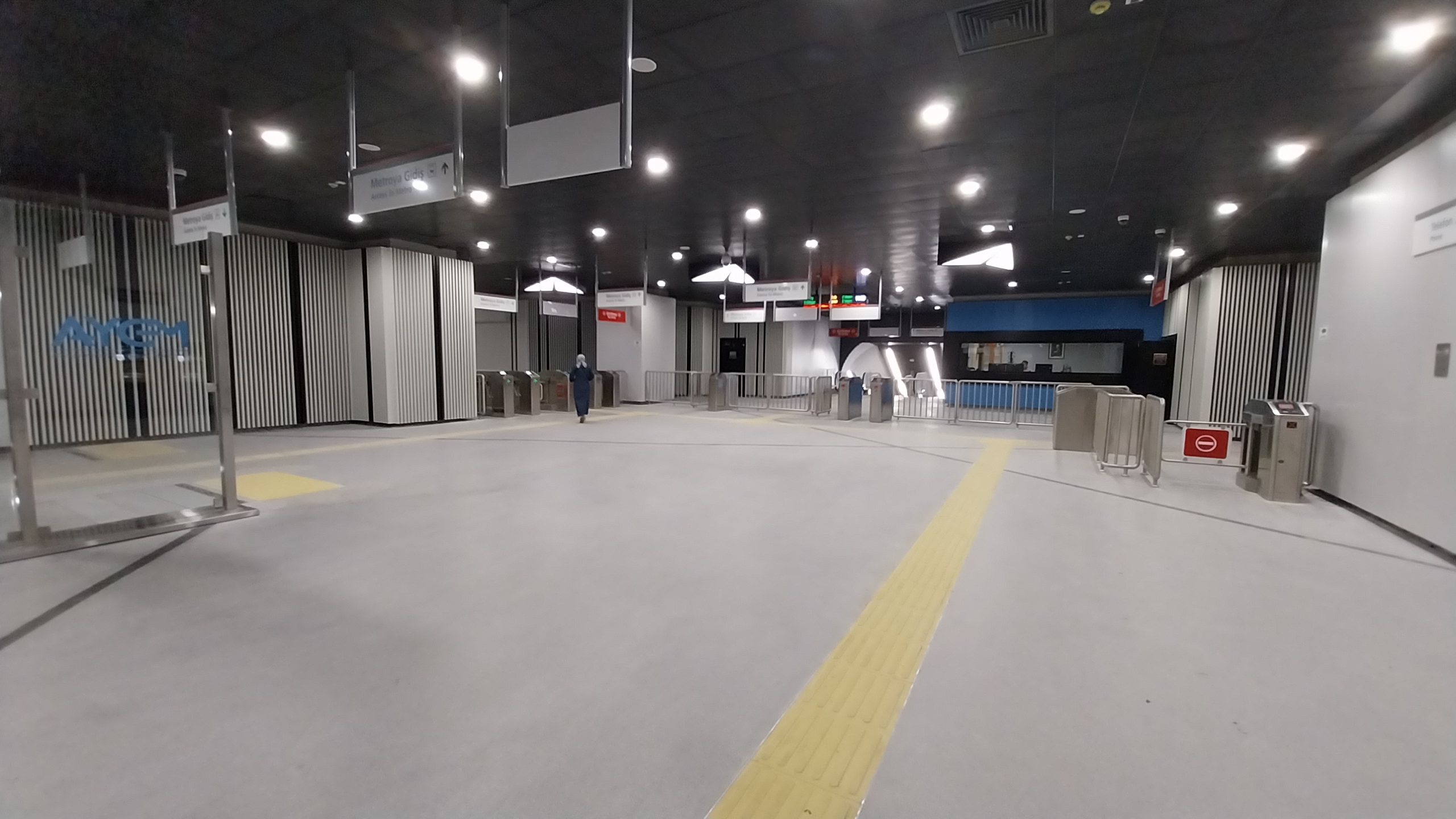
Ticket hall

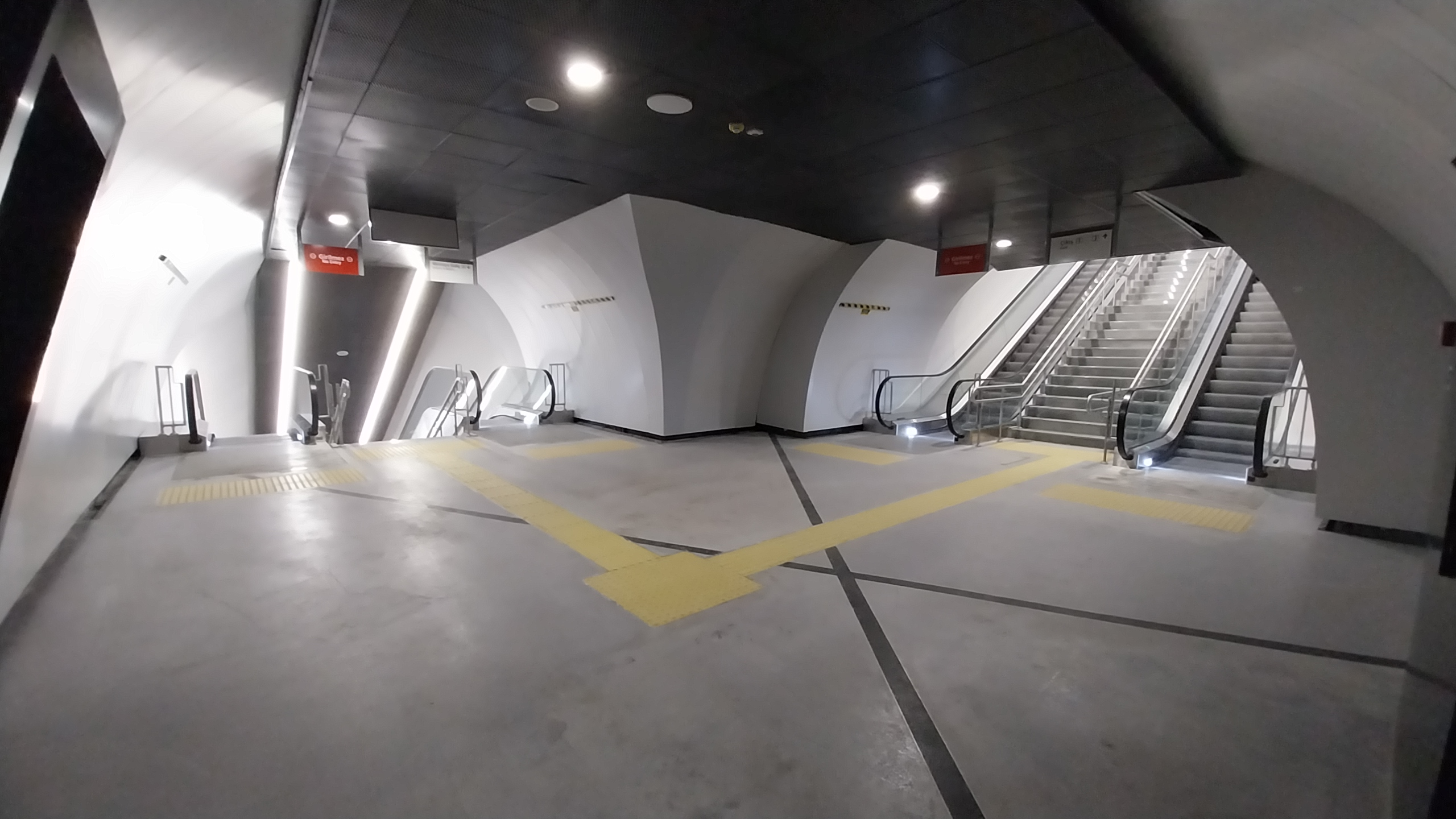
Escalators 1

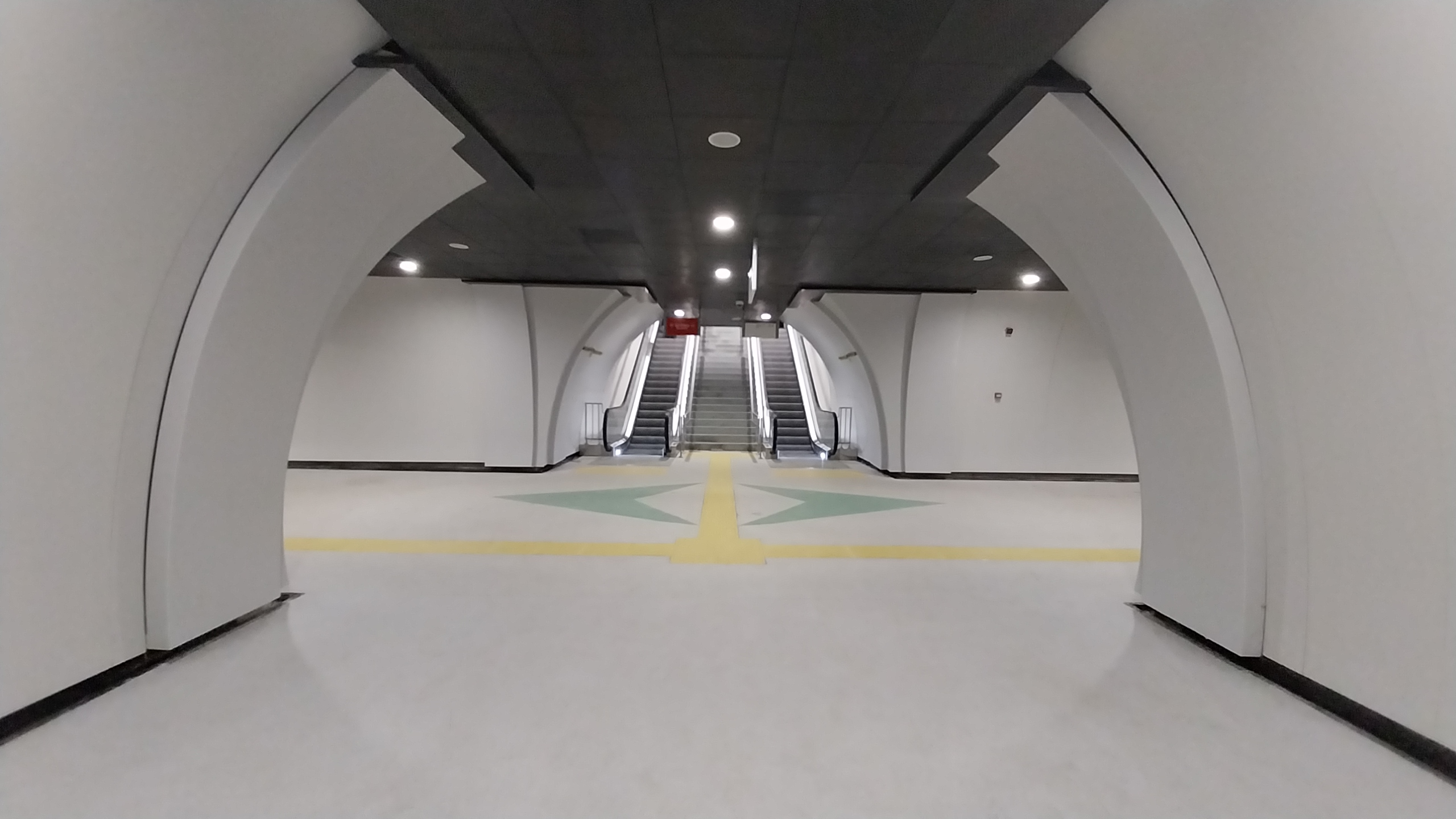
Escalators 2

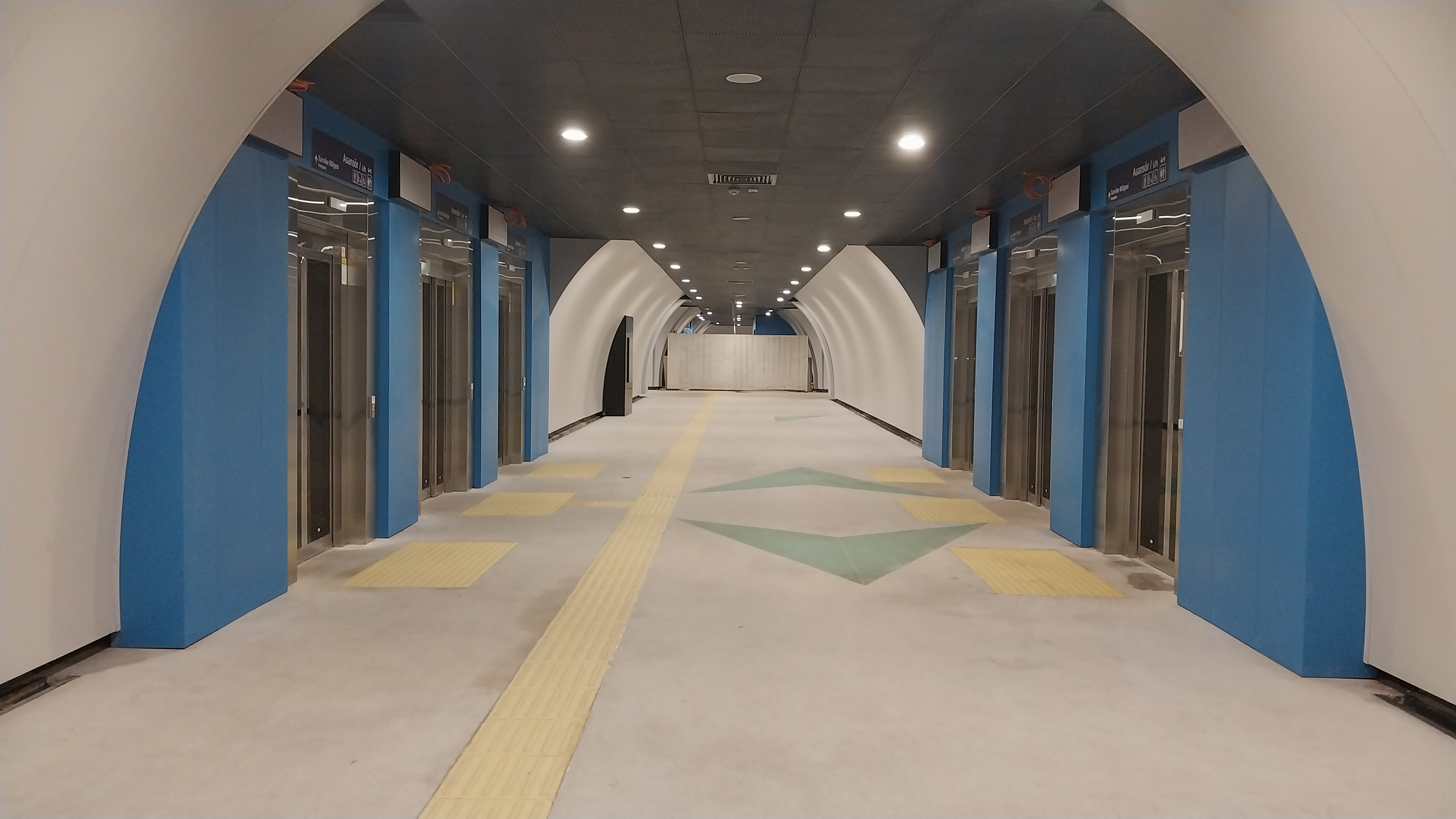
Elevators

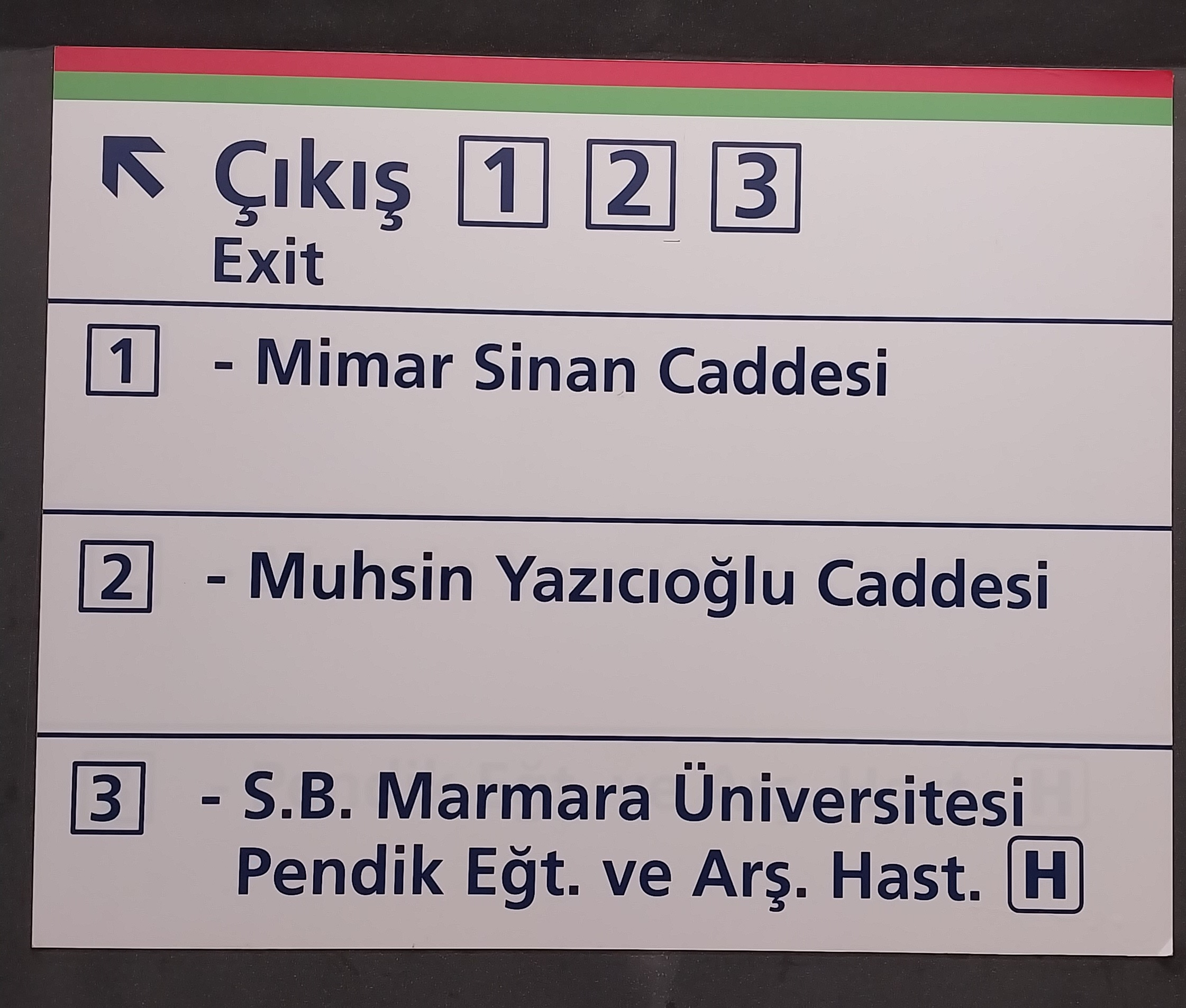
Exit sign

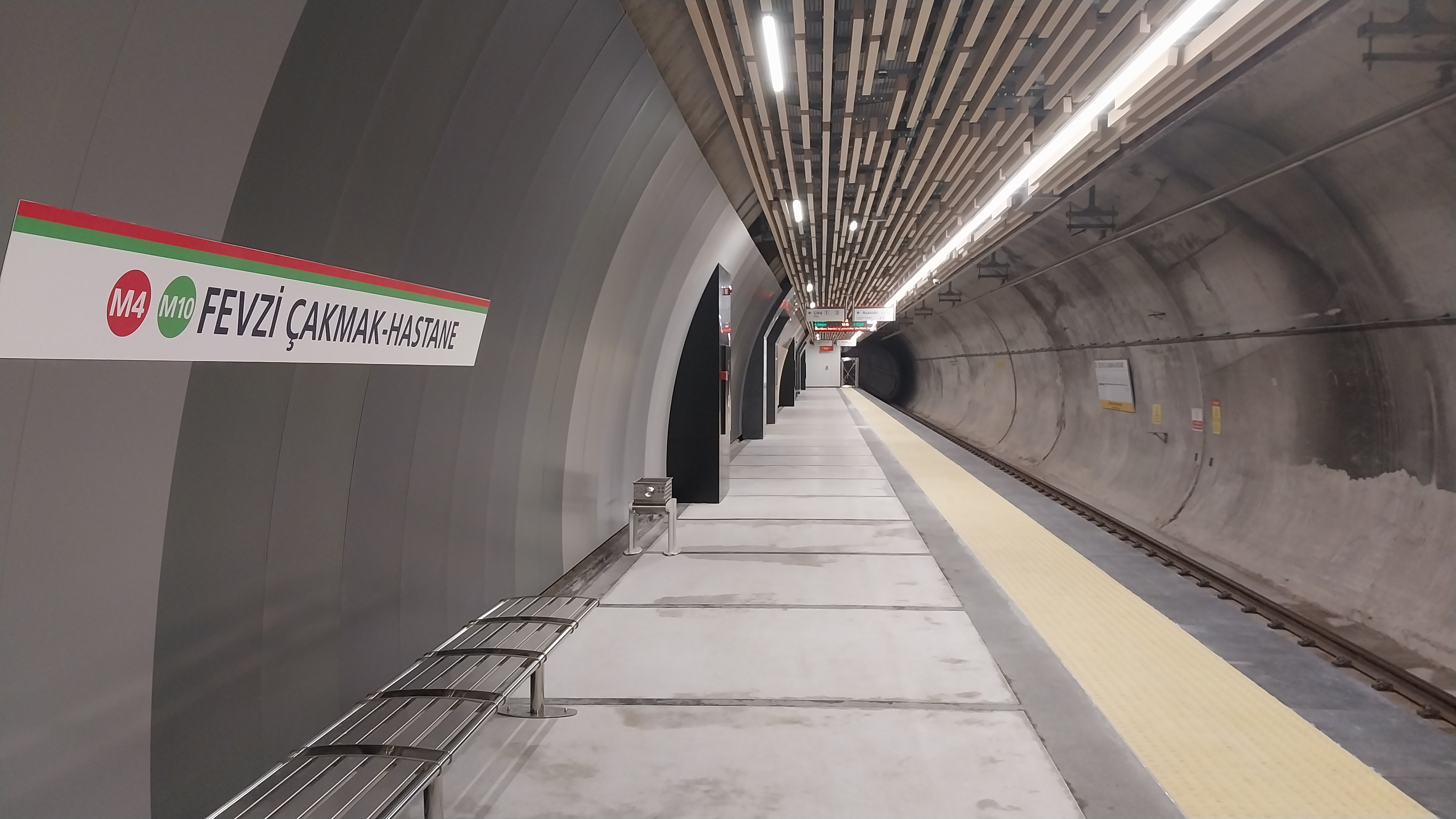
Platform
