= Tavşantepe station =

Station of the Istanbul Metro

Tavşantepe

General information
- Location: D.100, Doğu Mah., 34890; Pendik
- Coordinates: 40.8822°N 29.2473°E
- System: Istanbul Metro rapid transit station
- Owner: Istanbul Metro
- Line: M4
- Platforms: 1 island platform
- Tracks: 2
- Connections: İETT Bus: 16KH, 17K, 17P, 130, 130A, 130E, 130Ş, 132F, 132T, 132Y, 500T, E-9, KM2, KM10, KM11, KM12, KM13, KM14, KM23, KM24, KM29; Istanbul Minibus: Harem-Gebze

Construction
- Structure type: Underground
- Accessible: Yes

History
- Opened: 10 October 2016; 10 years ago
- Electrified: 1,500 V DC Overhead line

Services
Preceding station	Istanbul Metro	Following station
Pendik towards Kadıköy	M4 Line	Fevzi Çakmak-Hastane towards Sabiha Gökçen Airport
Future Service
Pendik towards Kadıköy	M4 Line	Kaynarca Merkez towards Tuzla
Location

Tavşantepe is an underground station of the M4 line of the Istanbul Metro. Located under beneath the D.100 state highway in the Doğu neighborhood of Pendik, Istanbul, it was opened on 10 October 2016 along with the 5 km (3.1 mi) expansion from Kartal to Pendik.

== Station Layout ==
P Platform level	Westbound	← toward Kadıköy (Pendik)
P Platform level	Island platform, doors will open on the left
P Platform level	Eastbound	toward Sabiha Gökçen Airport (Fevzi Çakmak-Hastane) →
